= Shiva =

Major deity in Hinduism

- God of Dissolution and Transformation.: God of Time, Yoga, Meditation and Arts; Lord of Yogis and Physicians; The Cosmic Dancer; The Supreme Being (Shaivism)
- Member of Trimurti
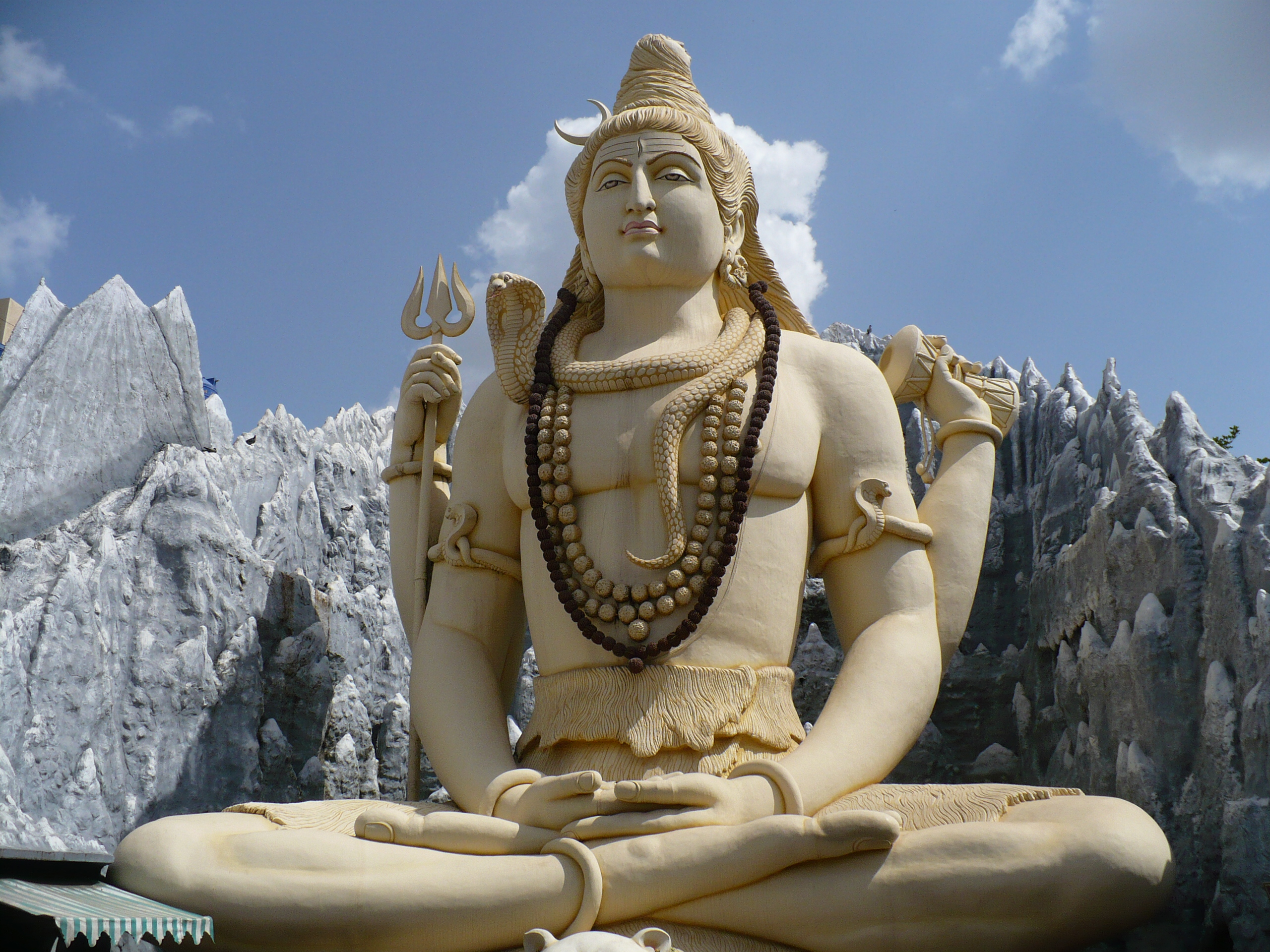
- Statue of Shiva at Shivoham Shiva Temple, Bangalore, Karnataka
- Other names: Tryambaka; Mahādeva; Maheśvara; Rudra; Pashupati; Bhava; Shambhu; Shankara
- Affiliation: Trimurti; Ishvara; Parabrahman; Paramatman; Bhairava; Sadashiva
- Abode: Kailasa; Shmashana
- Mantra: Om Namah Shivaya; Mahamrityunjaya Mantra
- Weapon: Trishula; Pashupatastra; Parashu; Pinaka bow
- Symbols: Lingam; Crescent Moon; Tripundra; Damaru; Vasuki; Third eye
- Day: Monday
- Mount: Nandi
- Festivals: Maha Shivaratri; Shravana; Kartik Purnima; Pradosha; Teej; Bhairava Ashtami

Genealogy
- Consort: Parvati, Sati and other forms of Shakti (Note: In scriptures, Shiva is paired with Shakti, the embodiment of power; who is known under various manifestations as Uma, Sati, Parvati, Durga, and Kali. Sati is generally regarded as the first wife of Shiva, who reincarnated as Parvati after her death. Out of these forms of Shakti, Parvati is considered the main consort of Shiva. Besides Shakti, the river goddess Ganga is sometimes attested as his secondary spouse in few Puranic scriptures.)
- Children: Kartikeya (son); Ganesha (son); See list of others

Shiva (/ˈʃɪvə/; Sanskrit: शिव, IAST: Śiva, lit. 'The Auspicious One'), also known as Mahadeva (/məˈhɑː ˈdeɪvə/; Sanskrit: महादेव, IAST: Mahādevaḥ, [mɐɦaːd̪eːʋɐh], lit. 'The Great God') and Hara, is one of the principal deities of Hinduism. He is the Supreme Being in Shaivism, one of the major traditions within Hinduism.

In the Shaivite tradition, Shiva is the Supreme Lord who creates, protects and transforms the universe. In the goddess-oriented Shakta tradition, the Supreme Goddess (Devi) is regarded as the energy and creative power (Shakti) and the equal complementary partner of Shiva. Shiva is one of the five equivalent deities in Panchayatana puja of the Smarta tradition of Hinduism. Shiva is known as The Destroyer within the Trimurti, the Hindu trinity which also includes Brahma and Vishnu.

Shiva has many aspects, benevolent as well as fearsome. In benevolent aspects, he is depicted as an omniscient yogi who lives an ascetic life on Kailasa as well as a householder with his wife Parvati and his two children, Ganesha and Kartikeya. In his fierce aspects, he is often depicted slaying demons. Shiva is also known as Adiyogi (the first yogi), regarded as the patron god of yoga, meditation and the arts. The iconographical attributes of Shiva are the serpent king Vasuki around his neck, the adorning crescent moon, the holy river Ganga flowing from his matted hair, the third eye on his forehead (the eye that turns everything in front of it into ashes when opened), the trishula or trident as his weapon, and the damaru. He is usually worshiped in the aniconic form of lingam.

Though associated with Vedic deity Rudra, Shiva may have non-Vedic roots, evolving as an amalgamation of various older non-Vedic and Vedic deities, including the Rigvedic storm god Rudra who may also have non-Vedic origins, into a single major deity. Shiva is a pan-Hindu deity, revered widely by Hindus in India, Nepal, Bangladesh, Sri Lanka and Indonesia (especially in Java and Bali).

== Etymology and other names ==
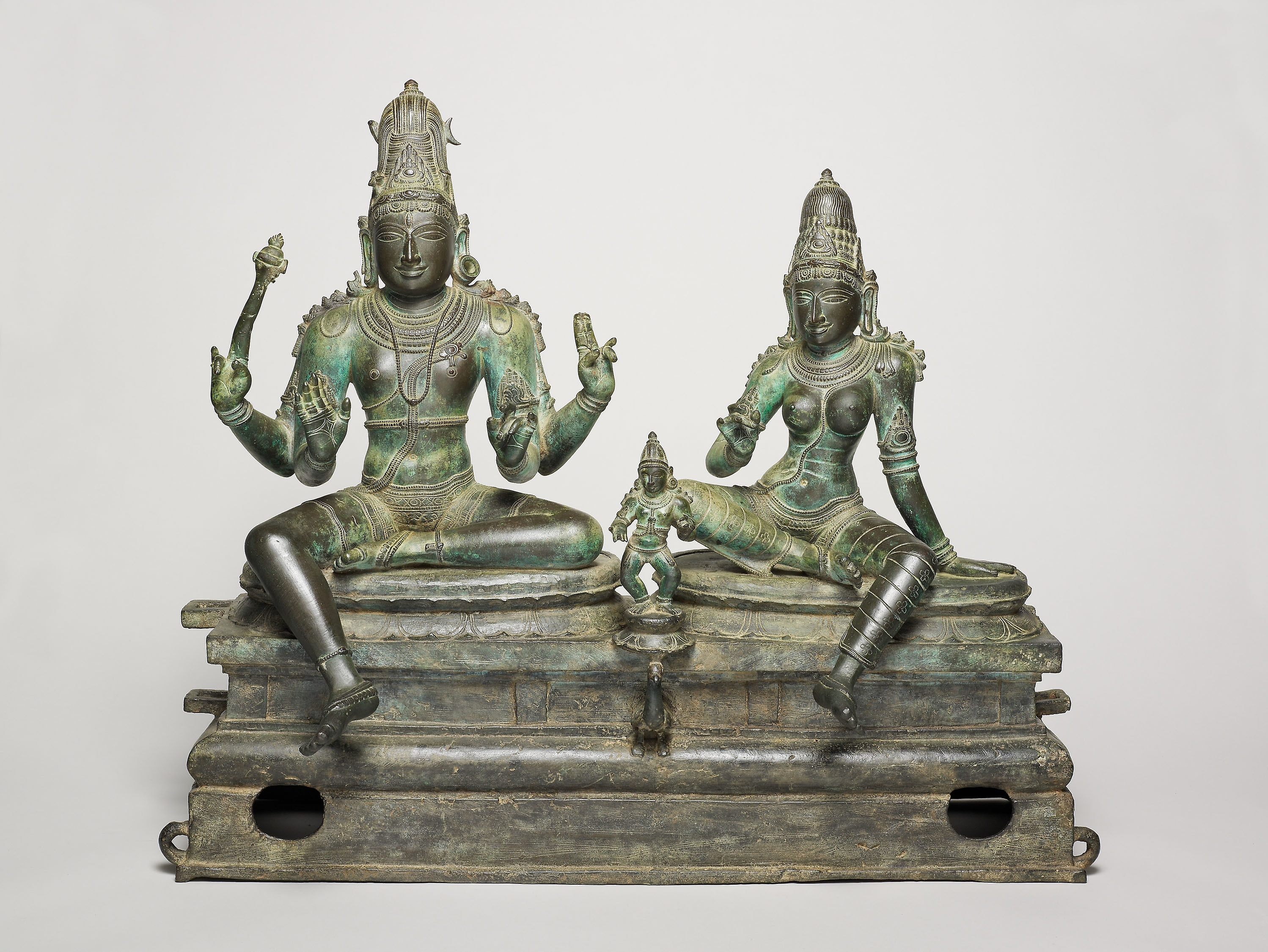
A depiction of Somaskanda with a dancing Skanda in the middle of Parvati and Shiva.

According to the Monier-Williams Sanskrit dictionary, the word "śiva" (Devanagari: शिव, also transliterated as shiva) means "auspicious, propitious, gracious, benign, kind, benevolent, friendly". The root words of śiva in folk etymology are śī which means "in whom all things lie, pervasiveness" and va which means "embodiment of grace".

The word śiva is used as an adjective in the Rig Veda (c. 1700–1100 BCE), as an epithet for several Rigvedic deities, including Rudra. The term śiva also connotes "liberation, final emancipation" and "the auspicious one"; this adjectival usage is addressed to many deities in Vedic literature. The term evolved from the Vedic Rudra-Shiva to the noun Shiva in the Epics and the Puranas, as an auspicious deity who is the "creator, reproducer and dissolver".

Sharma presents another etymology with the Sanskrit root śarv-, which means "to injure" or "to kill", interpreting the name to connote "one who can kill the forces of darkness".

The Sanskrit word śaiva means "relating to the god Shiva", and this term is the Sanskrit name both for one of the principal sects of Hinduism and for a member of that sect. It is used as an adjective to characterise certain beliefs and practices, such as Shaivism.

Some authors associate the name with the Tamil word śivappu meaning "red", noting that Shiva is linked to the Sun (śivan, "the Red one", in Tamil) and that Rudra is also called Babhru (brown, or red) in the Rigveda. The Vishnu sahasranama interprets Shiva to have multiple meanings: "The Pure One", and "the One who is not affected by three Guṇas of Prakṛti (Sattva, Rajas, and Tamas)".

Shiva is known by many names such as Viswanatha (lord of the universe), Mahadeva, Mahandeo, Mahasu, Mahesha, Maheshvara, Shankara, Shambhu, Rudra, Hara, Trilochana, Devendra (chief of the gods), Neelakanta, Subhankara, Trilokinatha (lord of the three realms), and Ghrneshwar (lord of compassion). The highest reverence for Shiva in Shaivism is reflected in his epithets Mahādeva ("Great god"; mahā "Great" and deva "god"), Maheśvara ("Great Lord"; mahā "great" and īśvara "lord"), and Parameśvara ("Supreme Lord").

Sahasranama are medieval Indian texts that list a thousand names derived from aspects and epithets of a deity. There are at least eight different versions of the Shiva Sahasranama, devotional hymns (stotras) listing many names of Shiva. The version appearing in Book 13 (Anuśāsanaparvan) of the Mahabharata provides one such list. (Note: This is the source for the version presented in Chidbhavananda, who refers to it being from the Mahabharata but does not explicitly clarify which of the two Mahabharata versions he is using. See Chidbhavananda 1997, p. 5.) Shiva also has Dasha-Sahasranamas (10,000 names) that are found in the Mahanyasa. The Shri Rudram Chamakam, also known as the Śatarudriya, is a devotional hymn to Shiva hailing him by many names.

== Historical development and literature ==
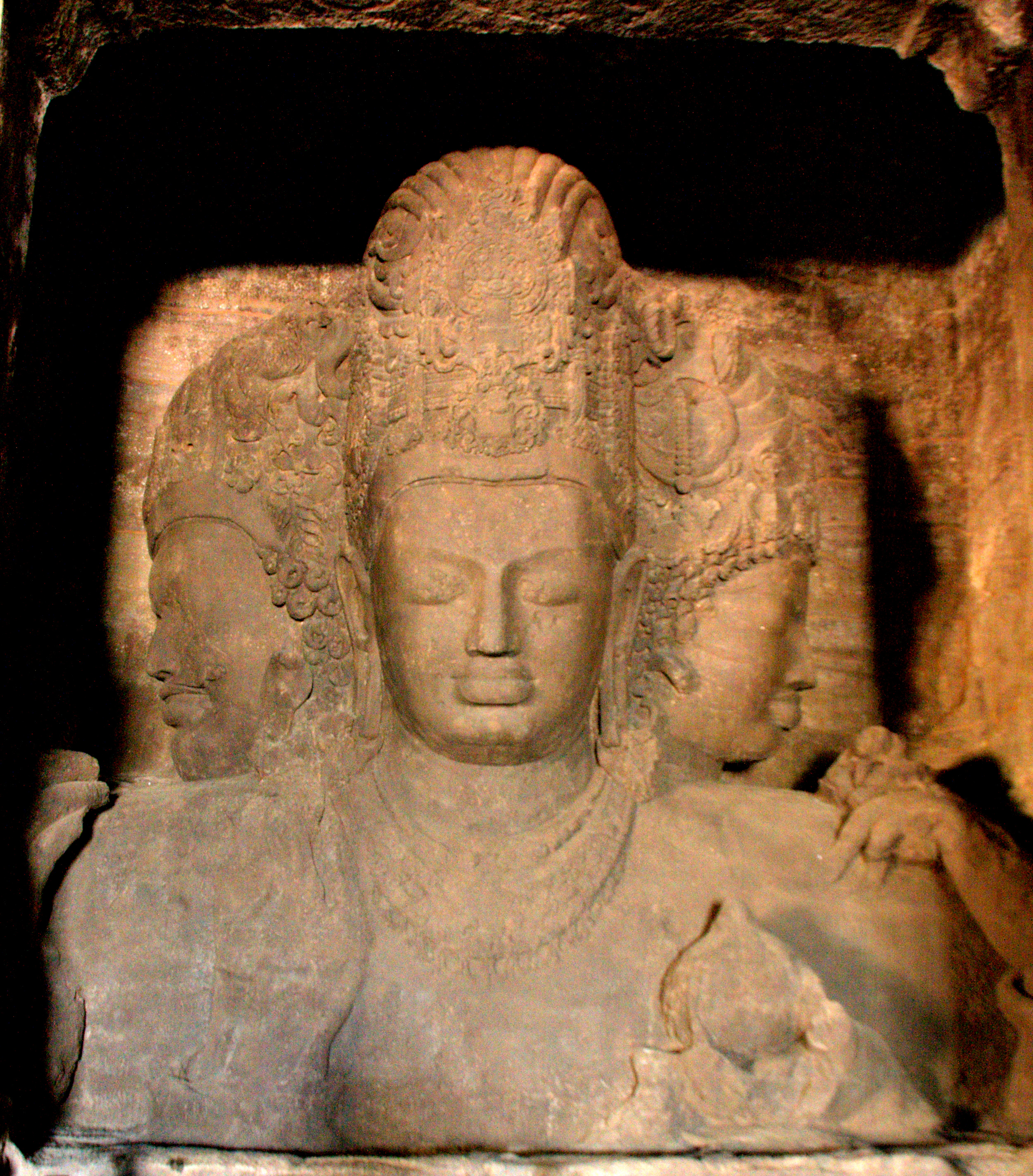
Three-headed Shiva sculpture, at the Elephanta Caves, Maharashtra; 6th century CE

=== Assimilation of traditions ===
The Shiva-related tradition is a major part of Hinduism, found all over the Indian subcontinent, such as India, Nepal, Sri Lanka, and Southeast Asia, such as Bali, Indonesia. Shiva-Rudra may have non-Vedic tribal roots, having "his origins in primitive tribes, signs and symbols," but the oldest literary attestation is the associated Vedic minor deity Rudra, who may also have non-Aryan origins. The figure of Shiva as he is known today is an amalgamation of various older deities into a single figure, due to the process of Sanskritization and the emergence of the Hindu synthesis in post-Vedic times. How the persona of Shiva converged as a composite deity is not well documented, a challenge to trace and has attracted much speculation. According to Vijay Nath:

Vishnu and Siva [...] began to absorb countless local cults and deities within their folds. The latter were either taken to represent the multiple facets of the same god or else were supposed to denote different forms and appellations by which the god came to be known and worshipped. [...] Siva became identified with countless local cults by the sheer suffixing of Isa or Isvara to the name of the local deity, e.g., Bhutesvara, Hatakesvara, Chandesvara."

An example of assimilation took place in Maharashtra, where a regional deity named Khandoba is a patron deity of farming and herding castes. The foremost center of worship of Khandoba in Maharashtra is in Jejuri. Khandoba has been assimilated as a form of Shiva himself, in which case he is worshipped in the form of a lingam. Khandoba's varied associations also include an identification with Surya and Karttikeya.

In Shiva myths that were roughly contemporary with early Christianity, Shiva and ascetics were portrayed as succumbing to temptation, combining both asceticism and lust. For example, when other gods, jealous of Shiva's asceticism, send a prostitute, he is successfully tempted.

=== Pre-Vedic elements ===
==== Prehistoric art ====
Prehistoric rock paintings dating to the Mesolithic from Bhimbetka rock shelters have been interpreted by some authors as depictions of Shiva. (Note: Temporal range for Mesolithic in South Asia is from 12000 to 4000 years before present. The term "Mesolithic" is not a useful term for the periodisation of the South Asian Stone Age, as certain tribes in the interior of the Indian subcontinent retained a Mesolithic culture into the modern period, and there is no consistent usage of the term. The range 12,000–4,000 Before Present is based on the combination of the ranges given by Agrawal et al. (1978) and by Sen (1999), and overlaps with the early Neolithic at Mehrgarh. D.P. Agrawal et al., "Chronology of Indian prehistory from the Mesolithic period to the Iron Age", Journal of Human Evolution, Volume 7, Issue 1, January 1978, 37–44: "A total time bracket of c. 6,000–2,000 B.C. will cover the dated Mesolithic sites, e.g. Langhnaj, Bagor, Bhimbetka, Adamgarh, Lekhahia, etc." (p. 38). S.N. Sen, Ancient Indian History and Civilization, 1999: "The Mesolithic period roughly ranges between 10,000 and 6,000 B.C." (p. 23).) However, Howard Morphy states that these prehistoric rock paintings of India, when seen in their context, are likely those of hunting party with animals, and that the figures in a group dance can be interpreted in many different ways.

==== Indus Valley and the Pashupati seal ====
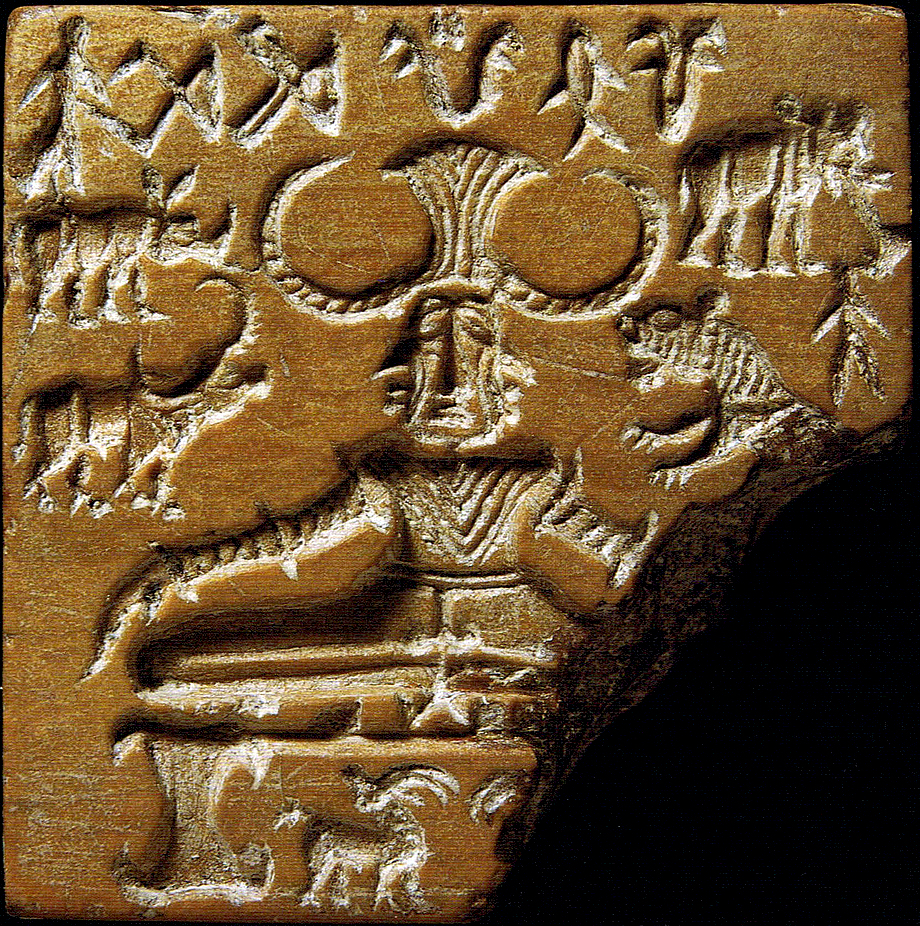
The Pashupati seal discovered during excavation of the Indus Valley archaeological site of Mohenjo-Daro and showing a possible representation of a "yogi" or "proto-Shiva" figure as Paśupati (Lord of the Animals" c. 2350–2000 BCE

Of several Indus valley seals that show animals, one seal that has attracted attention shows a large central figure, either horned or wearing a horned headdress and possibly ithyphallic, (Note: The ithyphallic representation of the erect shape connotes the very opposite in this context. It contextualise "seminal retention", practice of celibacy (Brahmacarya) and illustration of Urdhva Retas and represents Shiva as "he stands for complete control of the senses, and for the supreme carnal renunciation".) seated in a posture reminiscent of the Lotus position, surrounded by animals. This figure was named by early excavators of Mohenjo-daro as Pashupati (Lord of Animals, Sanskrit paśupati), an epithet of the later Hindu deities Shiva and Rudra. Sir John Marshall and others suggested that this figure is a prototype of Shiva, with three faces, seated in a "yoga posture" with the knees out and feet joined. Semi-circular shapes on the head were interpreted as two horns. Scholars such as Gavin Flood, John Keay and Doris Meth Srinivasan have expressed doubts about this suggestion.

Gavin Flood states that it is not clear from the seal that the figure has three faces, is seated in a yoga posture, or even that the shape is intended to represent a human figure. He characterises these views as "speculative", but adds that it is nevertheless possible that there are echoes of Shaiva iconographic themes, such as half-moon shapes resembling the horns of a bull. John Keay writes that "he may indeed be an early manifestation of Lord Shiva as Pashu-pati", but a couple of his specialties of this figure does not match with Rudra. Writing in 1997, Srinivasan interprets what John Marshall interpreted as facial as not human but more bovine, possibly a divine buffalo-man.

The interpretation of the seal continues to be disputed. McEvilley, for example, states that it is not possible to "account for this posture outside the yogic account". Asko Parpola states that other archaeological finds such as the early Elamite seals dated to 3000–2750 BCE show similar figures and these have been interpreted as "seated bull" and not a yogi, and the bovine interpretation is likely more accurate. Gregory L. Possehl in 2002, associated it with the water buffalo, and concluded that while it would be appropriate to recognise the figure as a deity, and its posture as one of ritual discipline, regarding it as a proto-Shiva would "go too far".

==== Proto-Indo-European elements ====
The Vedic beliefs and practices of the pre-classical era were closely related to the hypothesised Proto-Indo-European religion, and the pre-Islamic Indo-Iranian religion. The similarities between the iconography and theologies of Shiva with Greek and European deities have led to proposals for an Indo-European link for Shiva, or lateral exchanges with ancient central Asian cultures. His contrasting aspects such as being terrifying or blissful depending on the situation, are similar to those of the Greek god Dionysus, as are their iconic associations with bull, snakes, anger, bravery, dancing and carefree life. The ancient Greek texts of the time of Alexander the Great call Shiva "Indian Dionysus", or alternatively call Dionysus "god of the Orient". Similarly, the use of phallic symbol as an icon for Shiva is also found for Irish, Nordic, Greek (Dionysus) and Roman deities, as was the idea of this aniconic column linking heaven and earth among early Indo-Aryans, states Roger Woodward. Others contest such proposals, and suggest Shiva to have emerged from indigenous non-Aryan tribal origins.

=== Vedic elements ===
==== Rudra ====
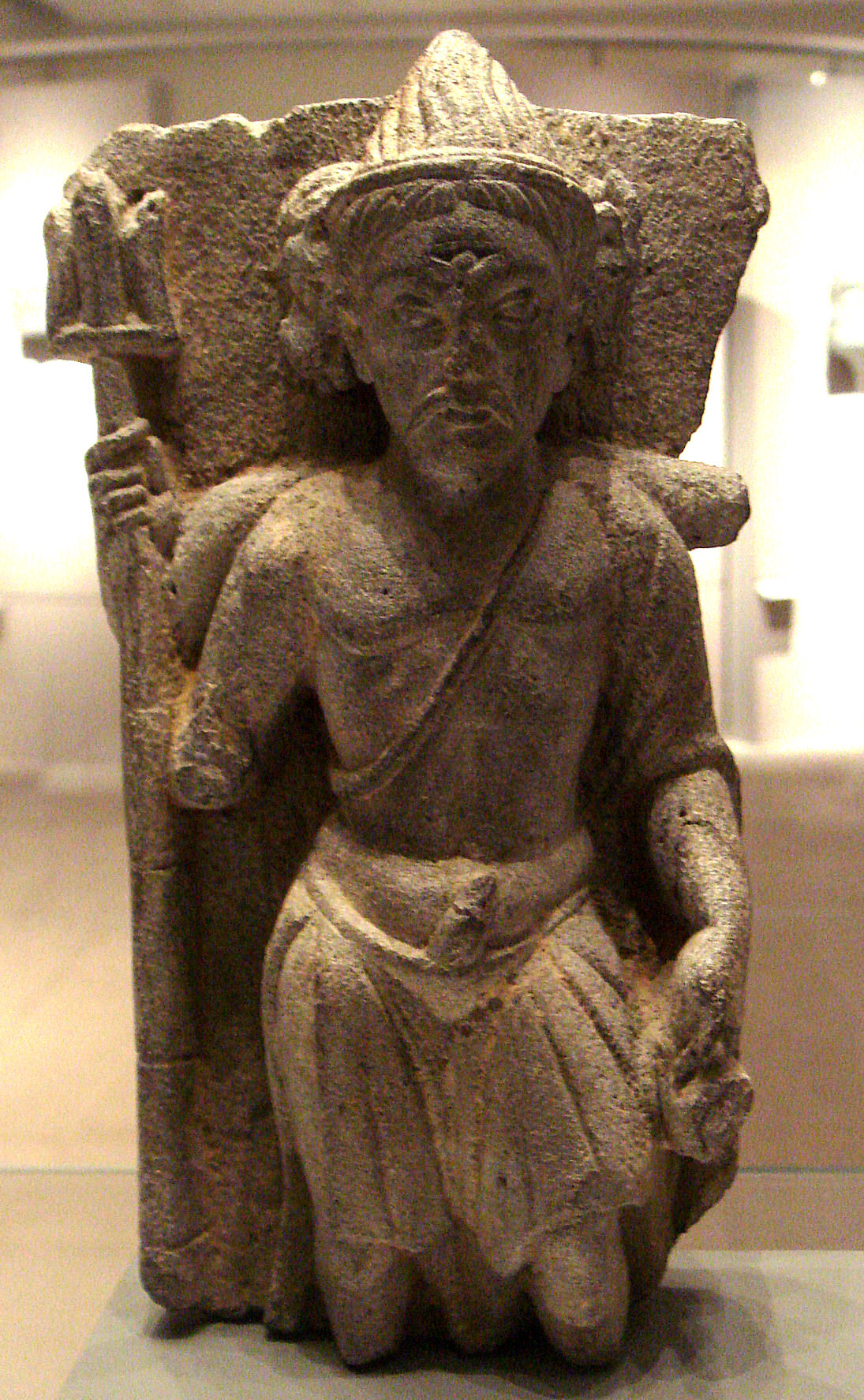
Three-headed Shiva, Gandhara, 2nd century AD

Shiva as we know him today shares many features with the Vedic god Rudra, and both Shiva and Rudra are viewed as the same personality in Hindu scriptures. The two names are used synonymously. Rudra, a Rigvedic deity with fearsome powers, was the god of the roaring storm. He is usually portrayed in accordance with the element he represents as a fierce, destructive deity. In RV 2.33, he is described as the "Father of the Rudras", a group of storm gods.

Flood notes that Rudra is an ambiguous god, peripheral in the Vedic pantheon, possibly indicating non-Vedic origins. Nevertheless, both Rudra and Shiva are akin to Wodan, the Germanic God of rage ("wütte") and the wild hunt.

According to Sadasivan, during the development of the Hindu synthesis attributes of the Buddha were transferred by Brahmins to Shiva, who was also linked with Rudra. The Rigveda has 3 out of 1,028 hymns dedicated to Rudra, and he finds occasional mention in other hymns of the same text. Hymn 10.92 of the Rigveda states that deity Rudra has two natures, one wild and cruel (Rudra), another that is kind and tranquil (Shiva).

The term Shiva also appears simply as an epithet, that means "kind, auspicious", one of the adjectives used to describe many different Vedic deities. While fierce ruthless natural phenomenon and storm-related Rudra is feared in the hymns of the Rigveda, the beneficial rains he brings are welcomed as Shiva aspect of him. This healing, nurturing, life-enabling aspect emerges in the Vedas as Rudra-Shiva, and in post-Vedic literature ultimately as Shiva who combines the destructive and constructive powers, the terrific and the gentle, as the ultimate recycler and rejuvenator of all existence.

The Vedic texts do not mention bull or any animal as the transport vehicle (vahana) of Rudra or other deities. However, post-Vedic texts such as the Mahabharata and the Puranas state the Nandi bull, the Indian zebu, in particular, as the vehicle of Rudra and of Shiva, thereby unmistakably linking them as same.

==== Agni ====
Rudra and Agni have a close relationship. (Note: For a general statement of the close relationship, and example shared epithets, see: Sivaramamurti 1976a, p. 11. For an overview of the Rudra-Fire complex of ideas, see: Kramrisch 1981, pp. 15–19.) The identification between Agni and Rudra in the Vedic literature was an important factor in the process of Rudra's gradual transformation into Rudra-Shiva. (Note: For quotation "An important factor in the process of Rudra's growth is his identification with Agni in the Vedic literature and this identification contributed much to the transformation of his character as Rudra-Śiva." see: Chakravarti 1986, p. 17.) The identification of Agni with Rudra is explicitly noted in the Nirukta, an important early text on etymology, which says, "Agni is also called Rudra." The interconnections between the two deities are complex, and according to Stella Kramrisch:

The fire myth of Rudra-Śiva plays on the whole gamut of fire, valuing all its potentialities and phases, from conflagration to illumination.

In the Śatarudrīya, some epithets of Rudra, such as Sasipañjara ("Of golden red hue as of flame") and Tivaṣīmati ("Flaming bright"), suggest a fusing of the two deities. (Note: For "Note Agni-Rudra concept fused" in epithets Sasipañjara and Tivaṣīmati see: Sivaramamurti 1976a, p. 45.) Agni is said to be a bull, and Shiva possesses a bull as his vehicle, Nandi. The horns of Agni, who is sometimes characterised as a bull, are mentioned. In medieval sculpture, both Agni and the form of Shiva known as Bhairava have flaming hair as a special feature.

==== Indra ====
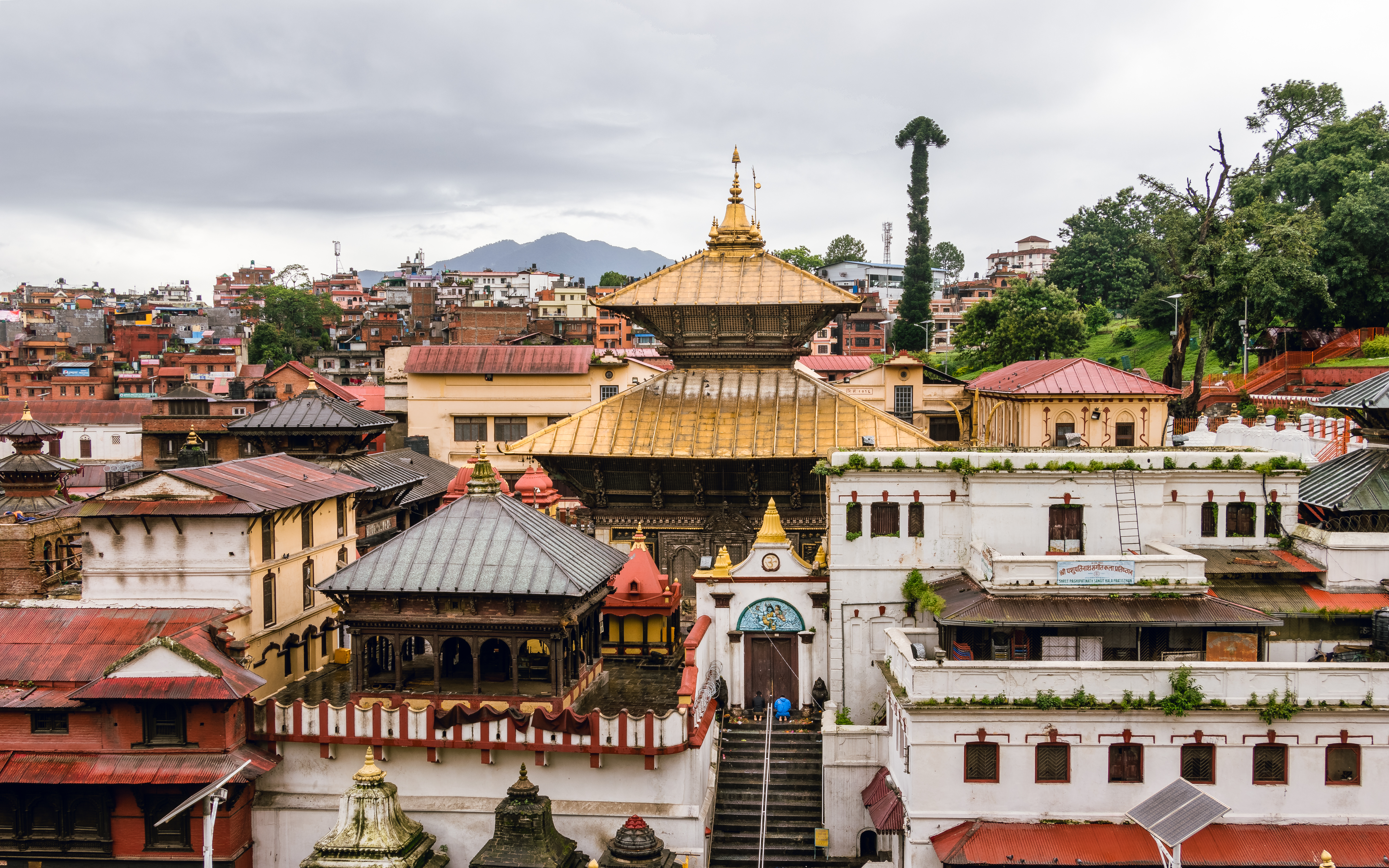
Pashupatinath Temple, Nepal, dedicated to Shiva as the lord of all beings

According to Wendy Doniger, the Saivite fertility myths and some of the phallic characteristics of Shiva are inherited from Indra. Doniger gives several reasons for her hypothesis. Both are associated with mountains, rivers, male fertility, fierceness, fearlessness, warfare, the transgression of established mores, the Aum sound, the Supreme Self. In the Rig Veda the term śiva is used to refer to Indra. (2.20.3, (Note: For text of RV 2.20.3a as स नो युवेन्द्रो जोहूत्रः सखा शिवो नरामस्तु पाता । and translation as "May that young adorable Indra, ever be the friend, the benefactor, and protector of us, his worshipper".) 6.45.17, and 8.93.3.) Indra, like Shiva, is likened to a bull. In the Rig Veda, Rudra is the father of the Maruts, but he is never associated with their warlike exploits as is Indra.

Indra himself may have been adopted by the Vedic Aryans from the Bactria–Margiana Culture. According to Anthony,

Many of the qualities of Indo-Iranian god of might/victory, Verethraghna, were transferred to the adopted god Indra, who became the central deity of the developing Old Indic culture. Indra was the subject of 250 hymns, a quarter of the Rig Veda. He was associated more than any other deity with Soma, a stimulant drug (perhaps derived from Ephedra) probably borrowed from the BMAC religion. His rise to prominence was a peculiar trait of the Old Indic speakers.

The texts and artwork of Jainism show Indra as a dancer, although not identical generally resembling the dancing Shiva artwork found in Hinduism, particularly in their respective mudras. For example, in the Jain caves at Ellora, extensive carvings show dancing Indra next to the images of Tirthankaras in a manner similar to Shiva Nataraja. The similarities in the dance iconography suggests that there may be a link between ancient Indra and Shiva.

=== Development ===
A few texts such as Atharvashiras Upanishad mention Rudra, and assert all gods are Rudra, everyone and everything is Rudra, and Rudra is the principle found in all things, their highest goal, the innermost essence of all reality that is visible or invisible. The Kaivalya Upanishad similarly, states Paul Deussen – a German Indologist and professor of philosophy, describes the self-realized man as who "feels himself only as the one divine essence that lives in all", who feels identity of his and everyone's consciousness with Shiva (highest Atman), who has found this highest Atman within, in the depths of his heart.

Rudra's evolution from a minor Vedic deity to a supreme being is first evidenced in the Shvetashvatara Upanishad (400–200 BCE), according to Gavin Flood, presenting the earliest seeds of theistic devotion to Rudra-Shiva. Here Rudra-Shiva is identified as the creator of the cosmos and liberator of Selfs from the birth-rebirth cycle. The Svetasvatara Upanishad set the tone for early Shaivite thought, especially in chapter 3 verse 2 where Shiva is equated with Brahman: "Rudra is truly one; for the knowers of Brahman do not admit the existence of a second". The period of 200 BC to 100 AD also marks the beginning of the Shaiva tradition focused on the worship of Shiva as evidenced in other literature of this period. Other scholars such as Robert Hume and Doris Srinivasan state that the Shvetashvatara Upanishad presents pluralism, pantheism, or henotheism, rather than being a text just on Shiva theism.

Self-realization and Shaiva Upanishads

He who sees himself in all beings,
And all beings in him,
attains the highest Brahman,
not by any other means.

— Kaivalya Upanishad 10

Shaiva devotees and ascetics are mentioned in Patanjali's Mahābhāṣya (2nd-century BCE) and in the Mahabharata.

The earliest iconic artworks of Shiva may be from Gandhara and northwest parts of ancient India. There is some uncertainty as the artwork that has survived is damaged and they show some overlap with meditative Buddha-related artwork, but the presence of Shiva's trident and phallic symbolism in this art suggests it was likely Shiva. Numismatics research suggests that numerous coins of the ancient Kushan Empire (30–375 CE) that have survived, were images of a god who is probably Shiva. The Shiva in Kushan coins is referred to as Oesho of unclear etymology and origins, but the simultaneous presence of Indra and Shiva in the Kushan era artwork suggest that they were revered deities by the start of the Kushan Empire.

The Shaiva Upanishads are a group of 14 minor Upanishads of Hinduism variously dated from the last centuries of the 1st millennium BCE through the 17th century. These extol Shiva as the metaphysical unchanging reality Brahman and the Atman (Self), and include sections about rites and symbolisms related to Shiva.

The Shaiva Puranas, particularly the Shiva Purana and the Linga Purana, present the various aspects of Shiva, mythologies, cosmology and pilgrimage (Tirtha) associated with him. The Shiva-related Tantra literature, composed between the 8th and 11th centuries, are regarded in devotional dualistic Shaivism as Sruti. Dualistic Shaiva Agamas which consider Self within each living being and Shiva as two separate realities (dualism, dvaita), are the foundational texts for Shaiva Siddhanta. Other Shaiva Agamas teach that these are one reality (monism, advaita), and that Shiva is the Self, the perfection and truth within each living being. In Shiva related sub-traditions, there are ten dualistic Agama texts, eighteen qualified monism-cum-dualism Agama texts and sixty-four monism Agama texts.

Shiva-related literature developed extensively across India in the 1st millennium CE and through the 13th century, particularly in Kashmir and Tamil Shaiva traditions. Shaivism gained immense popularity in Tamilakam as early as the 7th century CE, with poets such as Appar and Sambandar composing rich poetry that is replete with present features associated with the deity, such as his tandava dance, the mulavam (dumru), the aspect of holding fire, and restraining the proud flow of the Ganga upon his braid. The monist Shiva literature posit absolute oneness, that is Shiva is within every man and woman, Shiva is within every living being, Shiva is present everywhere in the world including all non-living being, and there is no spiritual difference between life, matter, man and Shiva. The various dualistic and monist Shiva-related ideas were welcomed in medieval southeast Asia, inspiring numerous Shiva-related temples, artwork and texts in Indonesia, Myanmar, Cambodia, Laos, Vietnam, Thailand and Malaysia, with syncretic integration of local pre-existing theologies.

== Position within Hinduism ==
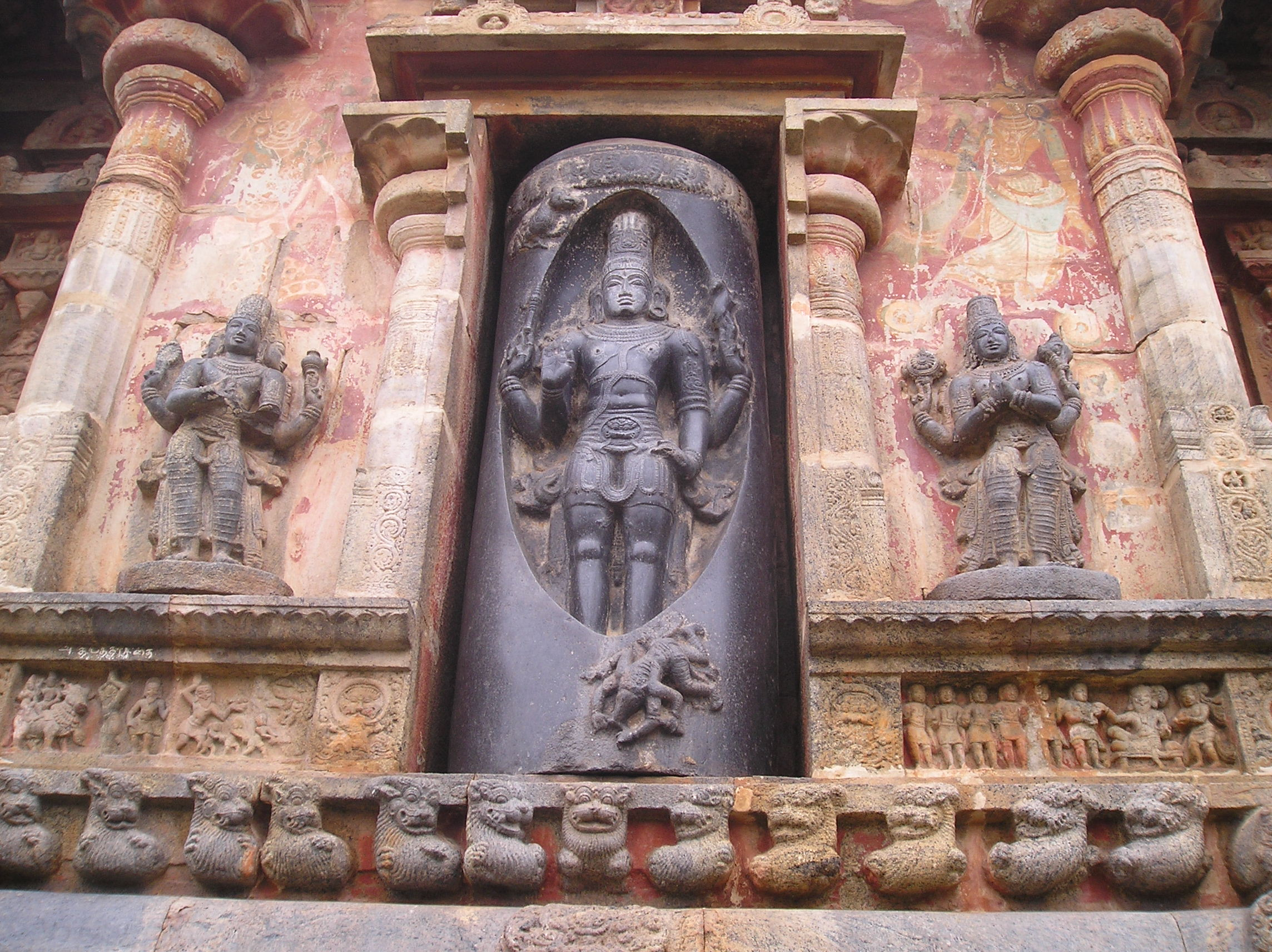
Lingodbhava is a Shaiva sectarian icon where Shiva is depicted rising from the Lingam (an infinite fiery pillar) that narrates how Shiva is the foremost of the Trimurti; Brahma on the left and Vishnu on the right are depicted bowing to Shiva in the centre.

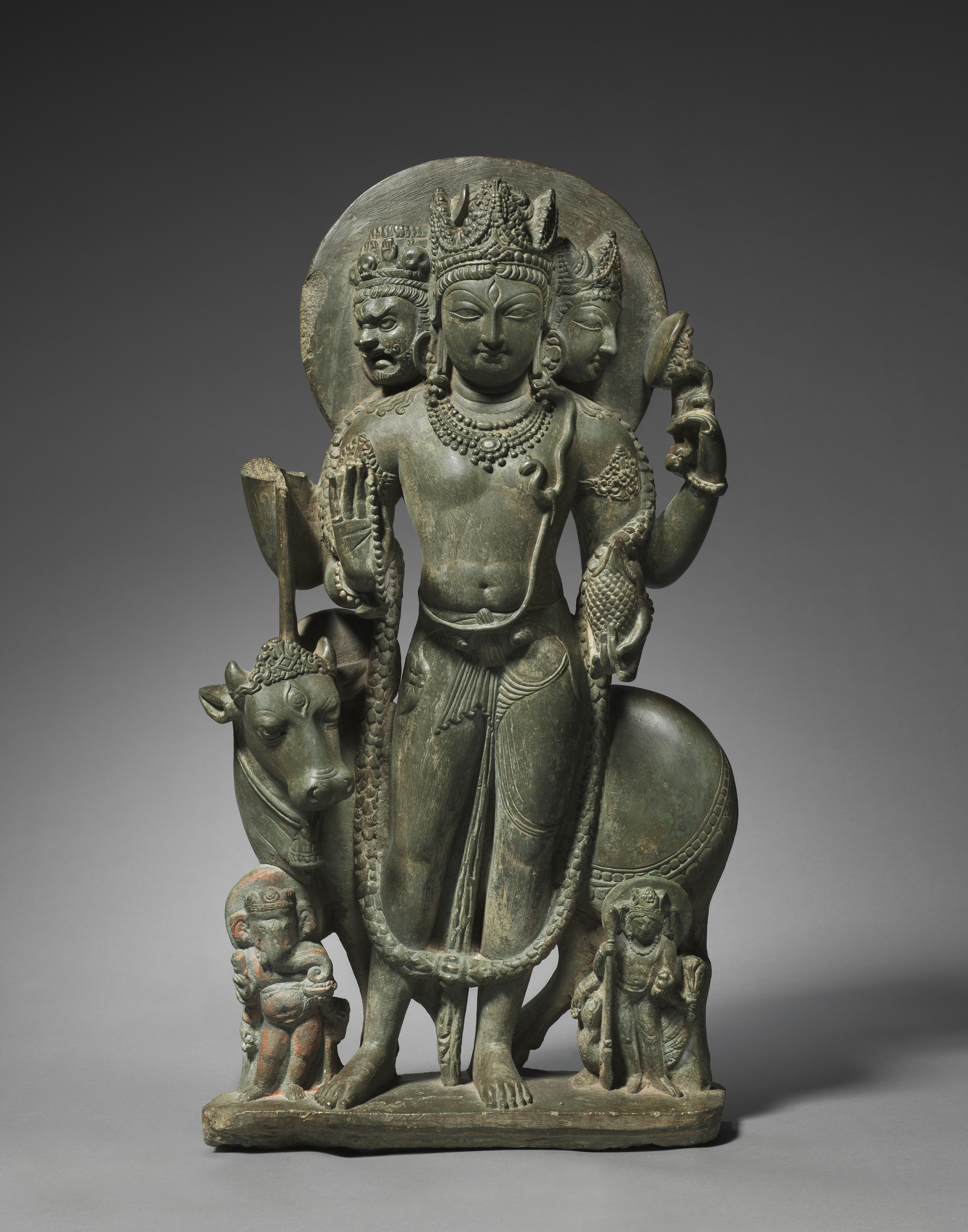
A c. 750–800 CE gray schist three-headed Shiva from Kashmir, with a three-eyed yogi-king front facing form, his consort Parvati as the left head, and three-eyed Bhairava as right head. His sons Ganesha and Kumara stand at his feet, and a three-eyed Vrishabha, his mount, stands behind.

=== Shaivism ===
Shaivism is one of the four major sects of Hinduism, the others being Vaishnavism, Shaktism and the Smarta Tradition. Followers of Shaivism, called "Shaivas", revere Shiva as the Supreme Being. Shaivas believe that Shiva is All and in all, the creator, preserver, destroyer, revealer and concealer of all that is. He is not only the creator in Shaivism, but he is also the creation that results from him, he is everything and everywhere. Shiva is the primal Self, the pure consciousness and Absolute Reality in the Shaiva traditions. Shiva is also part of 'Om' (ॐ) as a 'U' (उ).

The Shaivism theology is broadly grouped into two: the popular theology influenced by Shiva-Rudra in the Vedas, Epics and the Puranas; and the esoteric theology influenced by the Shiva and Shakti-related Tantra texts. The Vedic-Brahmanic Shiva theology includes both monist (Advaita) and devotional traditions (Dvaita), such as Tamil Shaiva Siddhanta and Lingayatism. Shiva temples feature items such as linga, Shiva-Parvati iconography, bull Nandi within the premises, and relief artwork showing aspects of Shiva.

The Tantric Shiva ("शिव") tradition ignored the mythologies and Puranas related to Shiva, and depending on the sub-school developed a variety of practices. For example, historical records suggest the tantric Kapalikas (literally, the 'skull-men') co-existed with and shared many Vajrayana Buddhist rituals, engaged in esoteric practices that revered Shiva and Shakti wearing skulls, begged with empty skulls, and sometimes used meat as a part of ritual. The esoteric tradition within Kashmir Shaivism has featured the Krama and Trika sub-traditions. The Krama sub-tradition focussed on esoteric rituals around Shiva-Kali pair. The Trika sub-tradition developed a theology of triads involving Shiva, combined it with an ascetic lifestyle focusing on personal Shiva in the pursuit of monistic self-liberation.

=== Vaishnavism ===
The Vaishnava (Vishnu-oriented) literature acknowledges and discusses Shiva. Like Shaiva literature that presents Shiva as supreme, the Vaishnava literature presents Vishnu as supreme. However, both traditions are pluralistic and revere both Shiva and Vishnu (along with Devi); their texts do not show exclusivism. Vaishnava texts such as the Bhagavata Purana while praising Krishna as the Ultimate Reality, also present Shiva and Shakti as a personalised forms equivalent to the same Ultimate Reality.

The texts of Shaivism tradition similarly praise Vishnu. The Skanda Purana, for example, states:

Vishnu is no one but Shiva, and he who is called Shiva is but identical with Vishnu.

— Skanda Purana, 1.8.20–21

Both traditions include legends about who is superior, about Shiva paying homage to Vishnu, and Vishnu paying homage to Shiva. However, in texts and artwork of either tradition, the mutual salutes are symbolism for complementarity. The Mahabharata declares the unchanging Ultimate Reality (Brahman) to be identical to Shiva and to Vishnu, that Vishnu is the highest manifestation of Shiva, and Shiva is the highest manifestation of Vishnu.

=== Shaktism ===
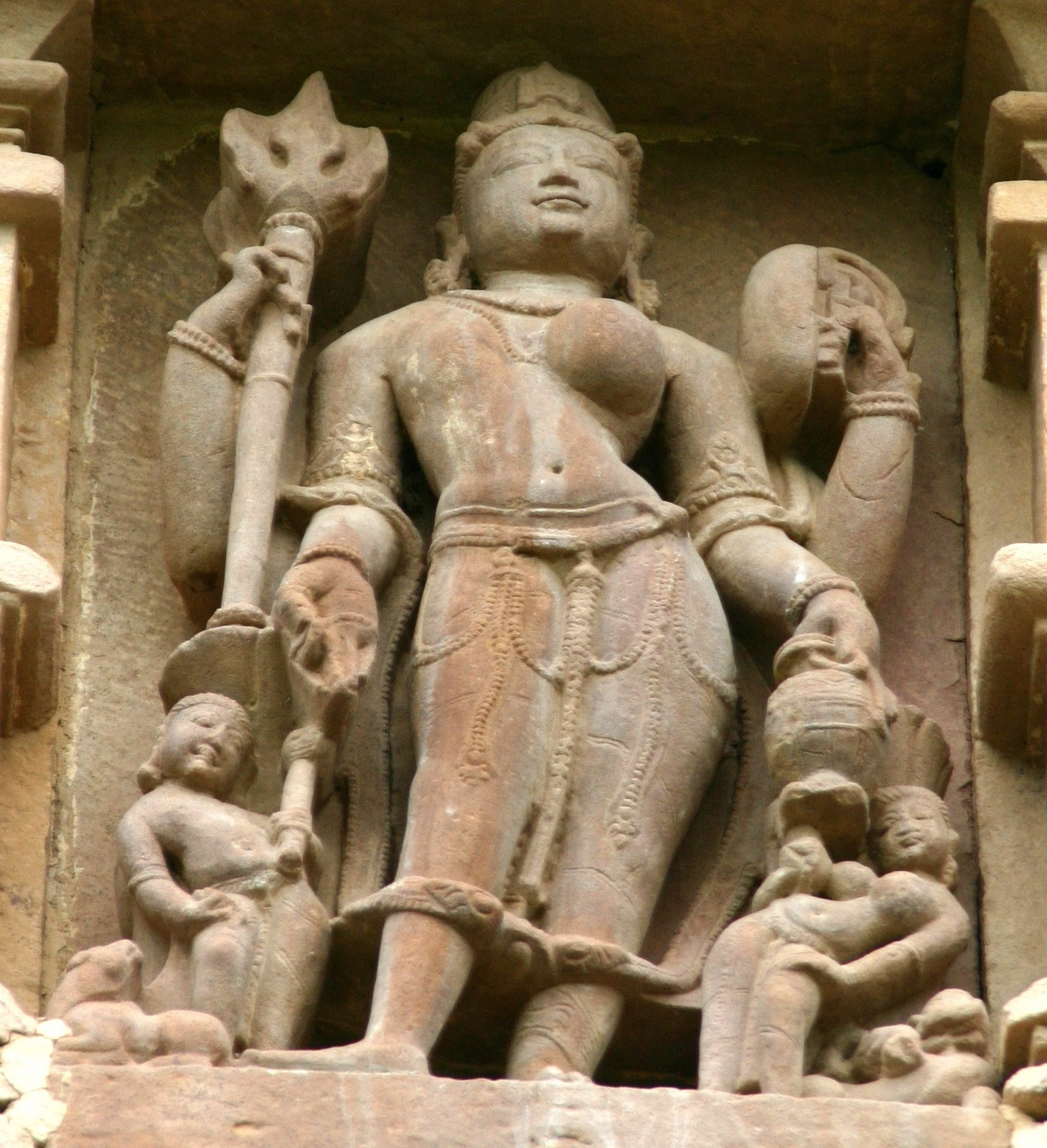
Ardhanarishvara sculpture, Khajuraho, depicting Shiva with goddess Parvati as his equal half. In the Ardhanarisvara concept, the icon is presented as half-man and half woman.

The goddess-oriented Shakti tradition of Hinduism is based on the premise that the Supreme Principle and the Ultimate Reality called Brahman is female (Devi), but it treats the male as her equal and complementary partner. This partner is Shiva.

The earliest evidence of the tradition of reverence for the feminine with Rudra-Shiva context, is found in the Hindu scripture Rigveda, in a hymn called the Devi Sukta.

The Devi Upanishad in its explanation of the theology of Shaktism, mentions and praises Shiva such as in its verse 19. Shiva, along with Vishnu, is a revered god in the Devi Mahatmya, a text of Shaktism considered by the tradition to be as important as the Bhagavad Gita. The Ardhanarisvara concept co-mingles god Shiva and goddess Shakti by presenting an icon that is half-man and half woman, a representation and theme of union found in many Hindu texts and temples.

=== Smarta tradition ===
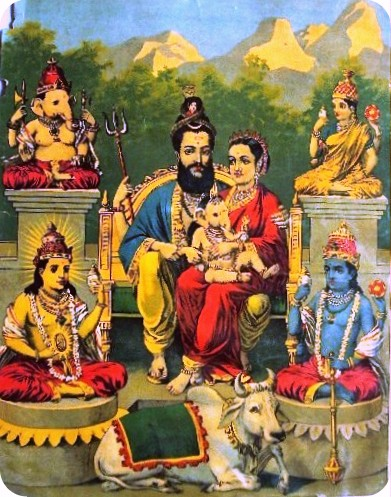
Oleograph by Raja Ravi Varma depicting a Shiva-centric Panchayatana. A bearded Shiva sits in the centre with his wife Parvati and their infant son Ganesha; surrounded by (clockwise from left upper corner) Ganesha, Devi, Vishnu, and Surya. Shiva's mount is the bull Nandi below Shiva.

In the Smarta tradition of Hinduism, Shiva is a part of its Panchayatana puja. This practice consists of the use of icons or anicons of five deities considered equivalent, set in a quincunx pattern. Shiva is one of the five deities, others being Vishnu, Devi (such as Parvati), Surya and Ganesha or Skanda or any personal god of devotee's preference (Ishta Devata).

Philosophically, the Smarta tradition emphasises that all idols (murti) are icons to help focus on and visualise aspects of Brahman, rather than distinct beings. The ultimate goal in this practice is to transition past the use of icons, recognise the Absolute symbolised by the icons, on the path to realising the nondual identity of one's Atman (Self) and the Brahman. Many Panchayatana mandalas and temples have been uncovered that are from the Gupta Empire period, and one Panchayatana set from the village of Nand (about 24 kilometres from Ajmer) has been dated to belong to the Kushan Empire era (pre-300 CE). The Kushan period set includes Shiva, Vishnu, Surya, Brahma and one deity whose identity is unclear.

=== Yoga ===
Shiva is considered the Great Yogi who is totally absorbed in himself – the transcendental reality. He is the Lord of Yogis, and the teacher of Yoga to sages. As Shiva Dakshinamurthi, states Stella Kramrisch, he is the supreme guru who "teaches in silence the oneness of one's innermost self (atman) with the ultimate reality (Brahman)." Shiva is also an archetype for samhara (Sanskrit: संहार) or dissolution which includes transcendence of human misery by the dissolution of maya, which is why Shiva is associated with Yoga.

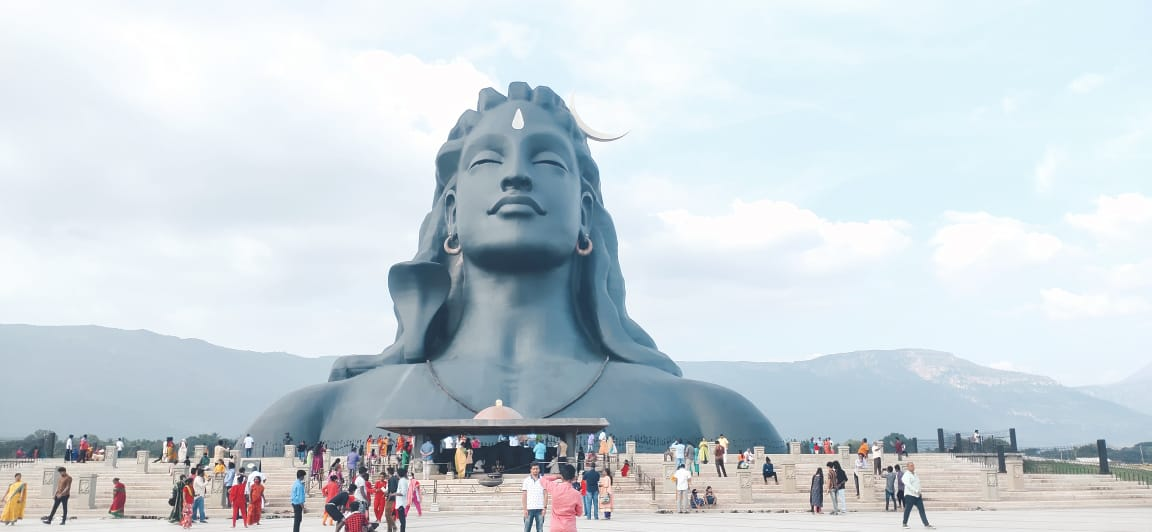
Adiyogi Shiva (the first Yogi) statue in Coimbatore

The theory and practice of Yoga, in different styles, has been a part of all major traditions of Hinduism, and Shiva has been the patron or spokesperson in numerous Hindu Yoga texts. These contain the philosophy and techniques for Yoga. These ideas are estimated to be from or after the late centuries of the 1st millennium CE, and have survived as Yoga texts such as the Isvara Gita (literally, 'Shiva's song'), which Andrew Nicholson – a professor of Hinduism and Indian Intellectual History – states have had "a profound and lasting influence on the development of Hinduism".

Other famed Shiva-related texts influenced Hatha Yoga, integrated monistic (Advaita Vedanta) ideas with Yoga philosophy and inspired the theoretical development of Indian classical dance. These include the Shiva Sutras, the Shiva Samhita, and those by the scholars of Kashmir Shaivism such as the 10th-century scholar Abhinavagupta. Abhinavagupta writes in his notes on the relevance of ideas related to Shiva and Yoga, by stating that "people, occupied as they are with their own affairs, normally do nothing for others", and Shiva and Yoga spirituality helps one look beyond, understand interconnectedness, and thus benefit both the individual and the world towards a more blissful state of existence.

=== Trimurti ===
The Trimurti is a concept in Hinduism in which the cosmic functions of creation, maintenance, and destruction are personified by the forms of Brahma the creator, Vishnu the maintainer or preserver and Shiva the destroyer or transformer. These three deities have been called "the Hindu triad" or the "Great Triple deity". However, the ancient and medieval texts of Hinduism feature many triads of gods and goddesses, some of which do not include Shiva.

== Attributes ==
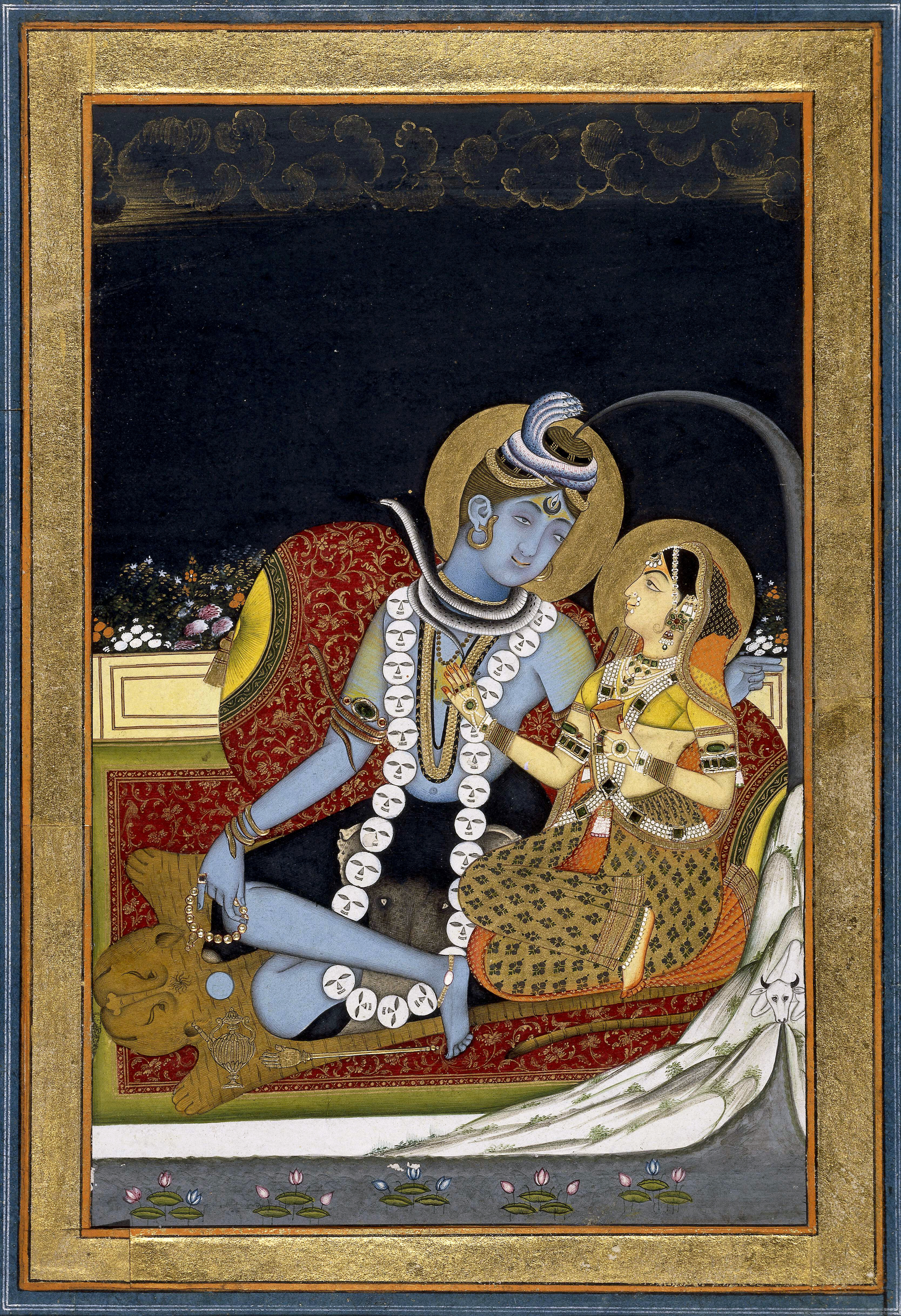
Shiva with Parvati. Shiva is depicted three-eyed, the Ganges flowing through his matted hair, wearing ornaments of serpents and a skull garland, covered in ashes, and seated on a tiger skin.

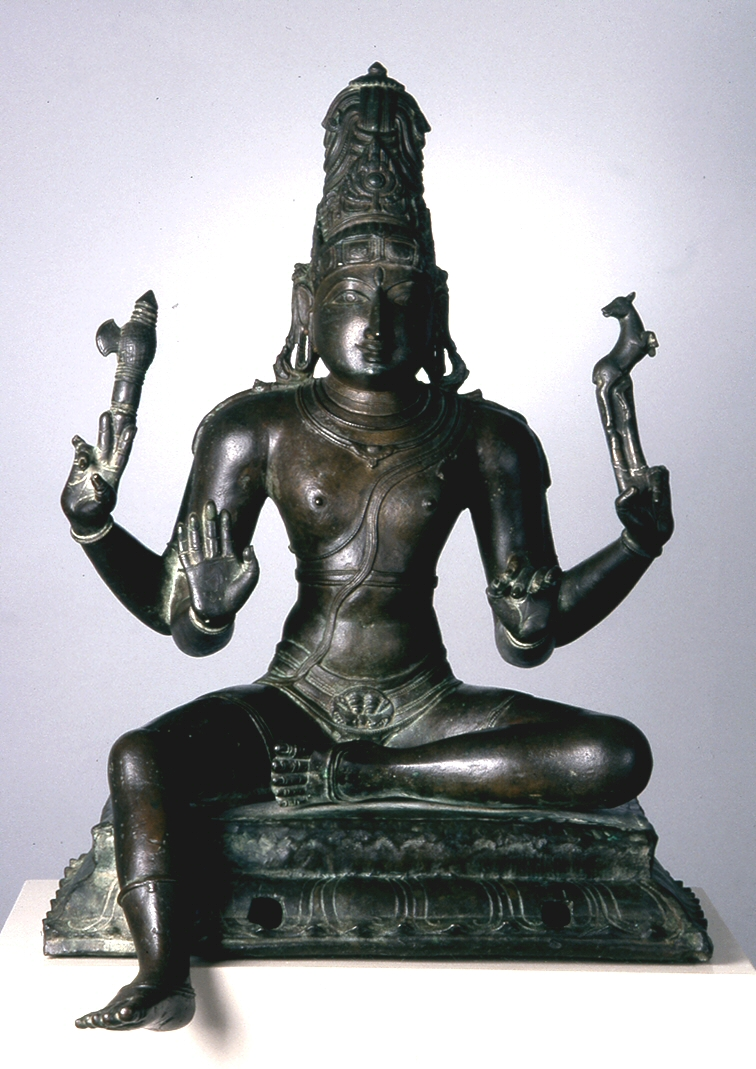
A seated Shiva holds an axe and deer in his hands.

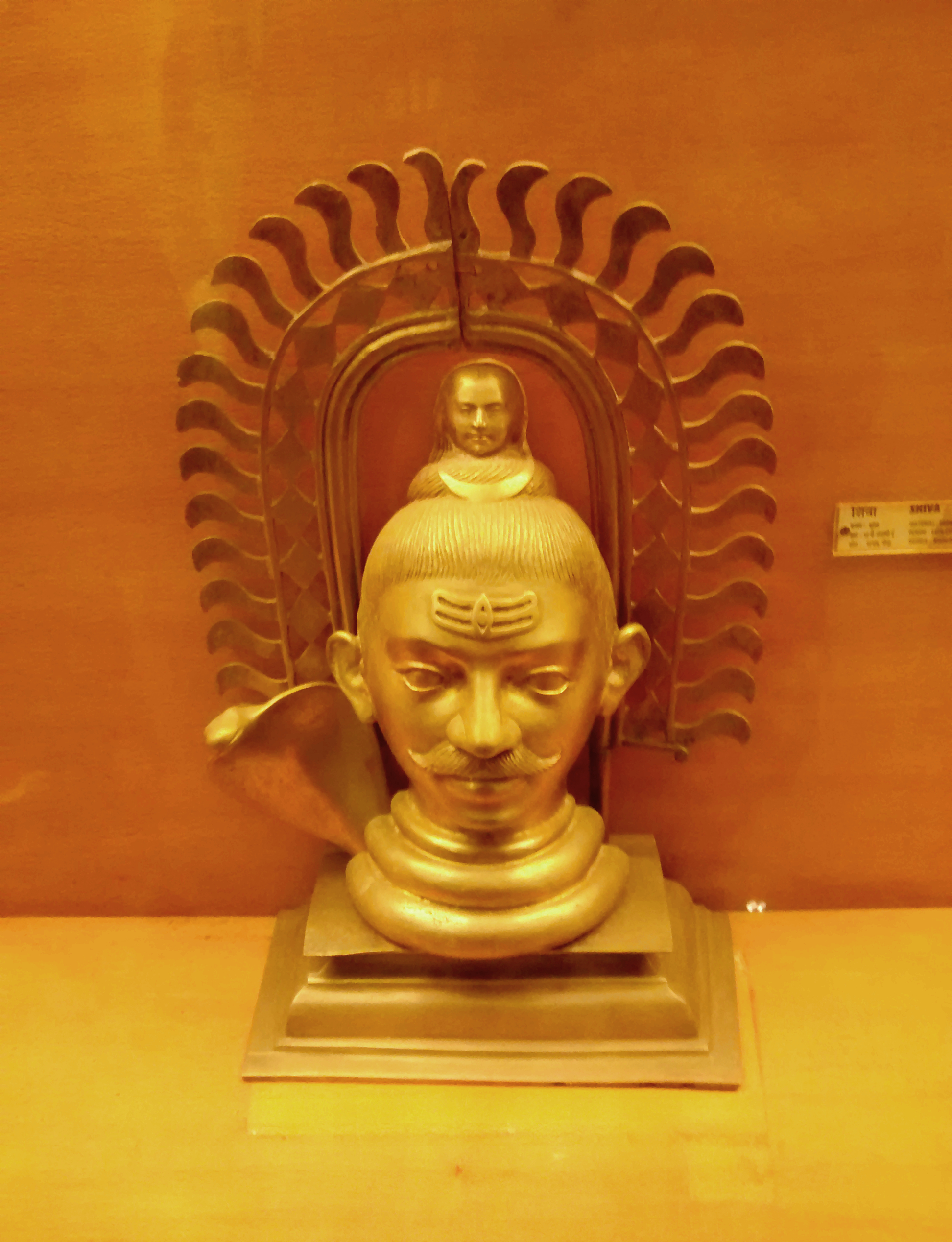
Siva with Moustache from Archaeological Museum GOA.

Shiva is traditionally represented with distinctive attributes and symbols:

- Third eye: Shiva is often depicted with a third eye, with which he burned Desire (Kāma) to ashes, called "Tryambakam" (Sanskrit: त्र्यम्बकम्), which occurs in many scriptural sources.
- Crescent moon: Shiva bears on his head the crescent moon. The epithet Candraśekhara (Sanskrit: चन्द्रशेखर "Having the moon as his crest" – candra = "moon"; śekhara = "crest, crown") refers to this feature. The placement of the moon on his head as a standard iconographic feature dates to the period when Rudra rose to prominence and became the major deity Rudra-Shiva. The origin of this linkage may be due to the identification of the moon with Soma, and there is a hymn in the Rig Veda where Soma and Rudra are jointly implored, and in later literature, Soma and Rudra came to be identified with one another, as were Soma and the moon.
- Ashes: Shiva iconography shows his body covered with ashes (bhasma, vibhuti). The ashes represent a reminder that all of material existence is impermanent, comes to an end becoming ash, and the pursuit of eternal Self and spiritual liberation is important.
- Matted hair: Shiva's distinctive hair style is noted in the epithets Jaṭin, "the one with matted hair", and Kapardin, "endowed with matted hair" or "wearing his hair wound in a braid in a shell-like (kaparda) fashion". A kaparda is a cowrie shell, or a braid of hair in the form of a shell, or, more generally, hair that is shaggy or curly.
- Blue throat: The epithet Nīlakaṇtha (Sanskrit नीलकण्ठ; nīla = "blue", kaṇtha = "throat"). Since Shiva drank the Halahala poison churned up from the Samudra Manthana to eliminate its destructive capacity. Shocked by his act, Parvati squeezed his neck and stopped it in his neck to prevent it from spreading all over the universe, supposed to be in Shiva's stomach. However the poison was so potent that it changed the color of his neck to blue.
- Meditating yogi: Shiva is often shown in a Yoga pose, meditating, sometimes seated on Mount Kailash as the Lord of Yoga.
- Sacred Ganga: The epithet Gangadhara, "Bearer of the river Ganga" (Ganges). The Ganga flows from the matted hair of Shiva. The Gaṅgā (Ganga), one of the major rivers of the country, is said to have made her abode in Shiva's hair.
- Tiger skin: Shiva is often shown seated upon a tiger skin.
- Vasuki: Shiva is often shown garlanded with the serpent Vasuki. Vasuki is the second king of the nāgas (the first being Vishnu's mount, Shesha). According to a legend, Vasuki was blessed by Shiva and worn by him as an ornament after the Samudra Manthana.
- Trident: Shiva typically carries a trident called Trishula. The trident is a weapon or a symbol in different Hindu texts. As a symbol, the Trishul represents Shiva's three aspects of "creator, preserver and destroyer", or alternatively it represents the equilibrium of three guṇas of sattva, rajas and tamas.
- Drum: A small drum shaped like an hourglass is known as a damaru. This is one of the attributes of Shiva in his famous dancing representation known as Nataraja. A specific hand gesture (mudra) called ḍamaru-hasta (Sanskrit for "ḍamaru-hand") is used to hold the drum.
- Axe (Parashu) and Deer are held in Shiva's hands in Odisha & south Indian icons.
- Rosary beads: he is garlanded with or carries a string of rosary beads in his right hand, typically made of Rudraksha. This symbolises grace, mendicant life and meditation.
- Nandī: Nandī, (Sanskrit: नन्दिन् (nandin)), is the name of the bull that serves as Shiva's mount. Shiva's association with cattle is reflected in his name Paśupati, or Pashupati (Sanskrit: पशुपति), translated by Sharma as "lord of cattle" and by Kramrisch as "lord of animals", who notes that it is particularly used as an epithet of Rudra.
- Mount Kailāsa: Kailasa in the Himalayas is his traditional abode. In Hindu mythology, Mount Kailāsa is conceived as resembling a Linga, representing the center of the universe.
- Gaṇa: The Gaṇas are attendants of Shiva and live in Kailash. They are often referred to as the bhutaganas, or ghostly hosts, on account of their nature. Generally benign, except when their lord is transgressed against, they are often invoked to intercede with the lord on behalf of the devotee. His son Ganesha was chosen as their leader by Shiva, hence Ganesha's title gaṇa-īśa or gaṇa-pati, "lord of the gaṇas".
- Varanasi: Varanasi (Benares) is considered to be the city specially loved by Shiva, and is one of the holiest places of pilgrimage in India. It is referred to, in religious contexts, as Kashi.

== Forms and depictions ==
According to Gavin Flood, "Shiva is a god of ambiguity and paradox," whose attributes include opposing themes, including fierceness and innocence. This ambiguity can also be seen in the diverse epithets attributed to him and the rich tapestry of narratives that delineate his persona within Hindu mythology.

=== Destroyer and Benefactor ===
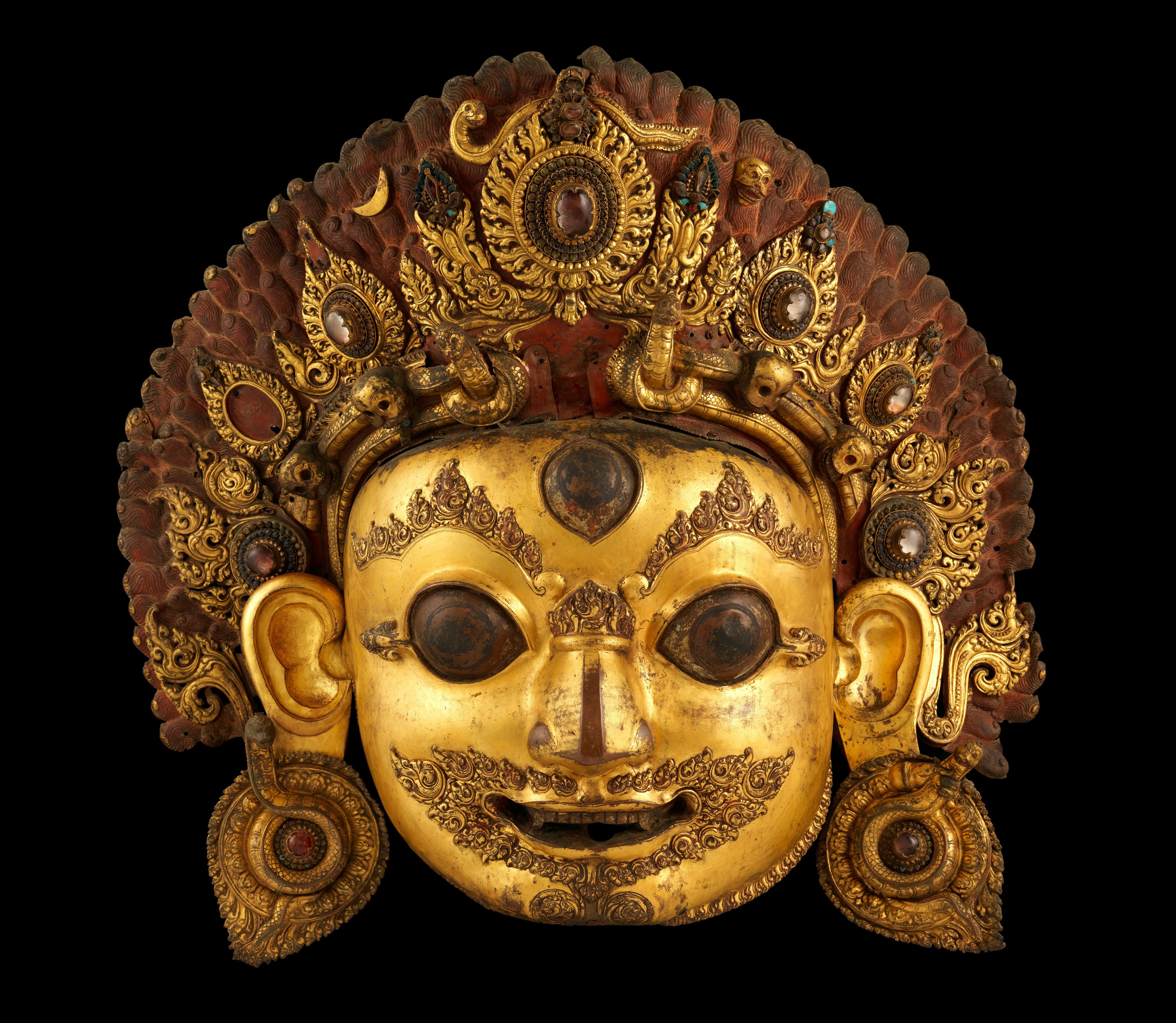
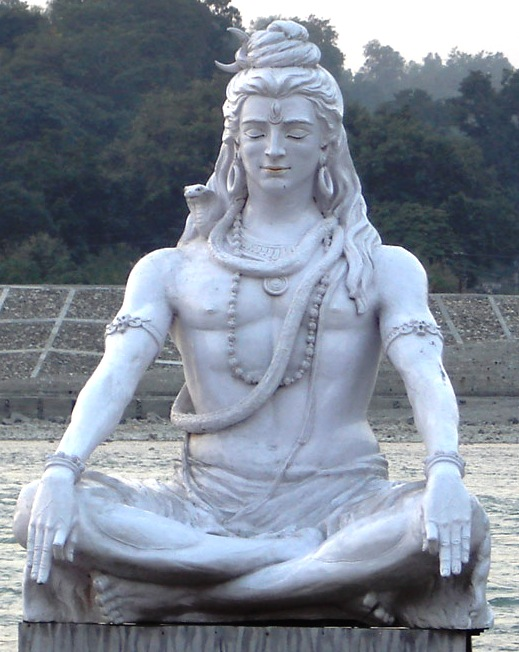
Shiva is represented in many aspects. Left: Bhairava, the fierce form of Shiva, 16th century Nepal; Right: Shiva as a meditating yogi in Rishikesh.

In Yajurveda, two contrary sets of attributes for both malignant or terrifying (Sanskrit: rudra) and benign or auspicious (Sanskrit: śiva) forms can be found, leading Chakravarti to conclude that "all the basic elements which created the complex Rudra-Śiva sect of later ages are to be found here". In the Mahabharata, Shiva is depicted as "the standard of invincibility, might, and terror", as well as a figure of honour, delight, and brilliance.

The duality of Shiva's fearful and auspicious attributes appears in contrasted names. The name Rudra reflects Shiva's fearsome aspects. According to traditional etymologies, the Sanskrit name Rudra is derived from the root rud-, which means "to cry, howl". Stella Kramrisch notes a different etymology connected with the adjectival form raudra, which means "wild, of rudra nature", and translates the name Rudra as "the wild one" or "the fierce god". R. K. Sharma follows this alternate etymology and translates the name as "terrible". Hara is an important name that occurs three times in the Anushasanaparvan version of the Shiva sahasranama, where it is translated in different ways each time it occurs, following a commentorial tradition of not repeating an interpretation. Sharma translates the three as "one who captivates", "one who consolidates", and "one who destroys". Kramrisch translates it as "the ravisher". Another of Shiva's fearsome forms is as Kāla "time" and Mahākāla "great time", which ultimately destroys all things. The name Kāla appears in the Shiva Sahasranama, where it is translated by Ram Karan Sharma as "(the Supreme Lord of) Time". Bhairava "terrible" or "frightful" is a fierce form associated with annihilation. In contrast, the name Śaṇkara, "beneficent" or "conferring happiness" reflects his benign form. The name Śambhu (Sanskrit: शम्भु swam-on its own; bhu-burn/shine) "self-shining/ shining on its own", also reflects this benign aspect.

=== Ascetic and householder ===
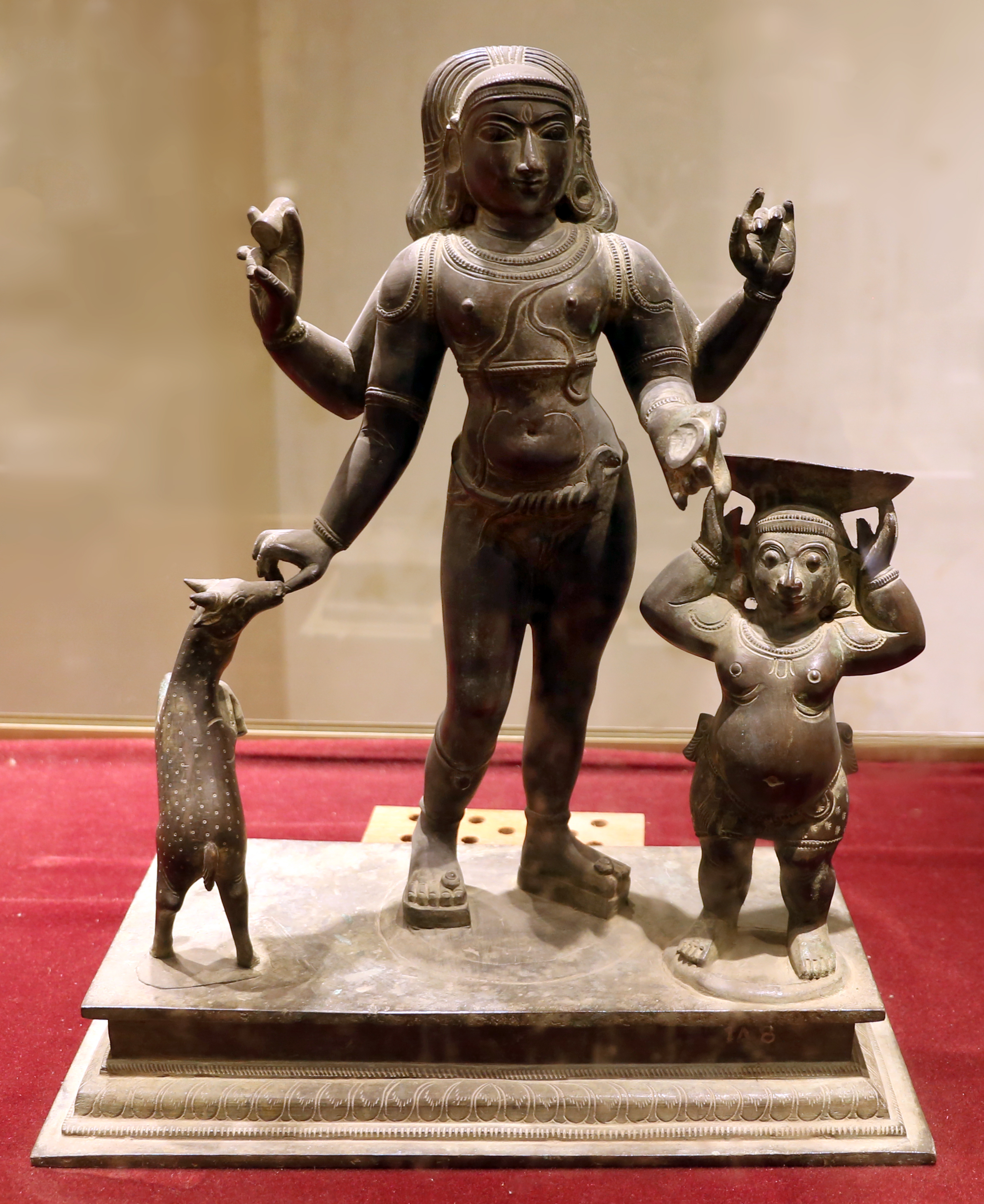
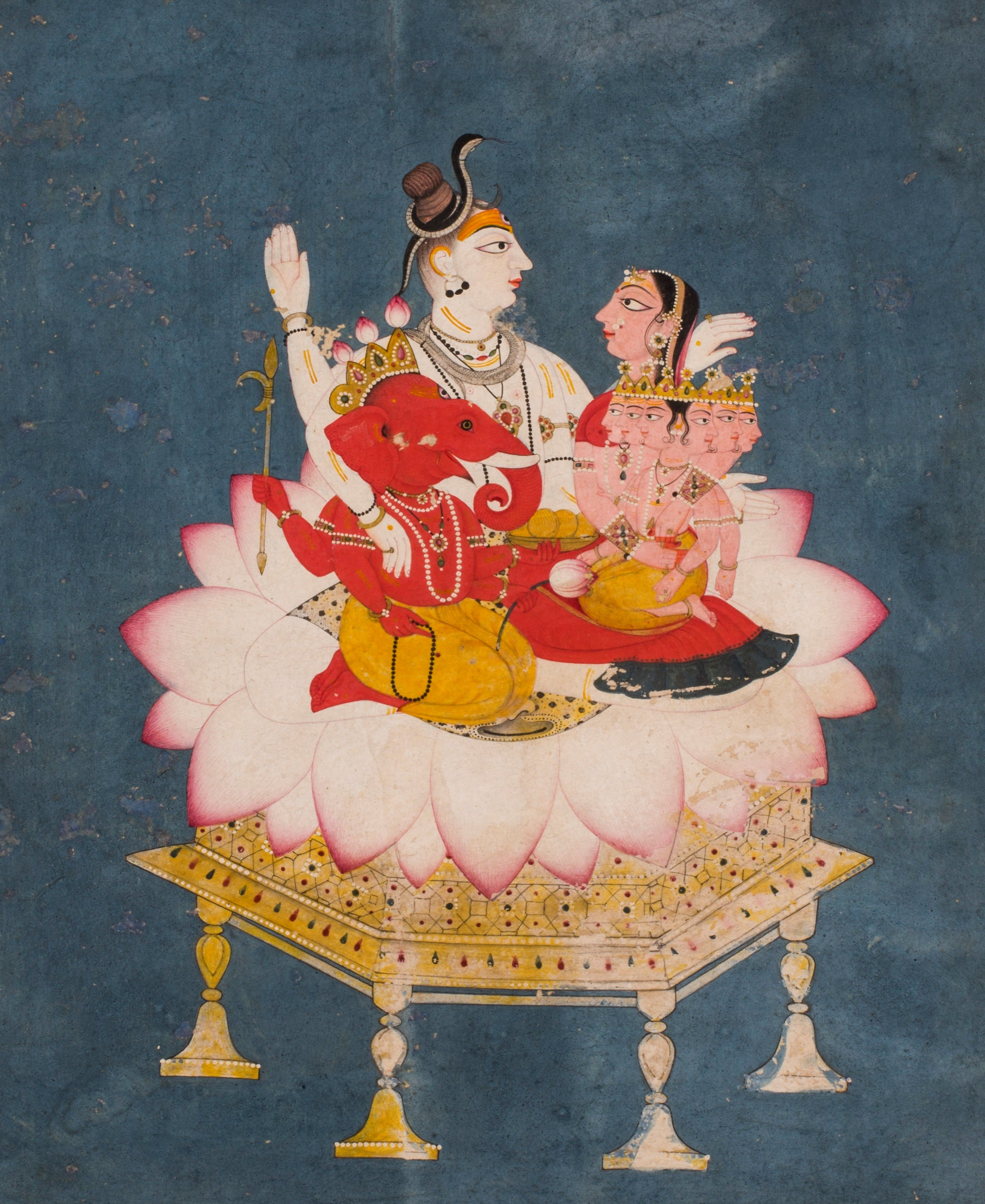
Shiva is depicted both as an ascetic mendicant (left as Bhikshatana) and as a householder with his wife Parvati and sons Ganesha and Kartikeya (right).

Shiva is depicted as both an ascetic yogi and as a householder (grihasta), roles which have been traditionally mutually exclusive in Hindu society. When depicted as a yogi, he may be shown sitting and meditating. His epithet Mahāyogi ("the great Yogi: Mahā = "great", Yogi = "one who practices Yoga") refers to his association with yoga. While Vedic religion was conceived mainly in terms of sacrifice, it was during the Epic period that the concepts of tapas, yoga, and asceticism became more important, and the depiction of Shiva as an ascetic sitting in philosophical isolation reflects these later concepts.

As a family man and householder, he has a wife, Parvati, and two sons, Ganesha and Kartikeya. His epithet Umāpati ("The husband of Umā") refers to this idea, and Sharma notes that two other variants of this name that mean the same thing, Umākānta and Umādhava, also appear in the sahasranama. Umā in epic literature is known by many names, including the benign Pārvatī. She is identified with Devi, the Divine Mother; Shakti (divine energy) as well as goddesses like Tripura Sundari, Durga, Kali, Kamakshi and Minakshi. The consorts of Shiva are the source of his creative energy. They represent the dynamic extension of Shiva onto this universe. His son Ganesha is worshipped throughout India and Nepal as the Remover of Obstacles, Lord of Beginnings and Lord of Obstacles. Kartikeya is worshipped in Southern India (especially in Tamil Nadu, Kerala and Karnataka) by the names Subrahmanya, Subrahmanyan, Shanmughan, Swaminathan and Murugan, and in Northern India by the names Skanda, Kumara, or Karttikeya.

Some regional deities are also identified as Shiva's children. As one story goes, Shiva is enticed by the beauty and charm of Mohini, Vishnu's female avatar, and procreates with her. As a result of this union, Shasta – identified with regional deities Ayyappan and Aiyanar – is born. In outskirts of Ernakulam in Kerala, a deity named Vishnumaya is stated to be offspring of Shiva and invoked in local exorcism rites, but this deity is not traceable in Hindu pantheon and is possibly a local tradition with "vaguely Chinese" style rituals, states Saletore. In some traditions, Shiva has daughters like the serpent-goddess Manasa and Ashokasundari. According to Doniger, two regional stories depict demons Andhaka and Jalandhara as the children of Shiva who war with him, and are later destroyed by Shiva.

=== Iconographic forms ===
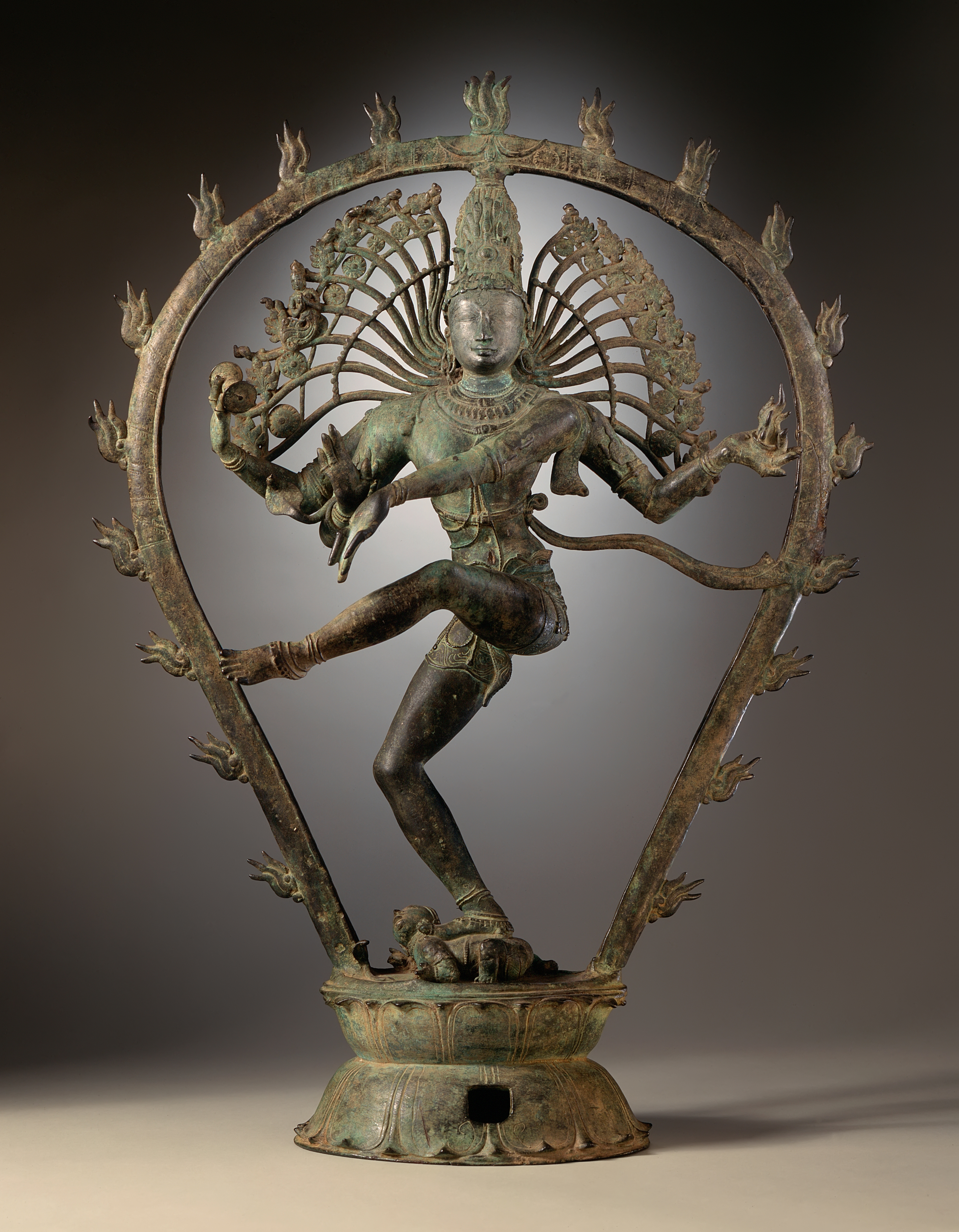
Chola dynasty statue depicting Shiva dancing as Nataraja (Los Angeles County Museum of Art)

The depiction of Shiva as Nataraja (Sanskrit नटराज; Naṭarāja) is a form (mūrti) of Shiva as "Lord of Dance". The names Nartaka ("dancer") and Nityanarta ("eternal dancer") appear in the Shiva Sahasranama. His association with dance and also with music is prominent in the Puranic period. In addition to the specific iconographic form known as Nataraja, various other types of dancing forms (Sanskrit: nṛtyamūrti) are found in all parts of India, with many well-defined varieties in Tamil Nadu in particular. The two most common forms of the dance are the Tandava, which later came to denote the powerful and masculine dance as Kala-Mahakala associated with the destruction of the world. When it requires the world or universe to be destroyed, Shiva does it by the Tandava, and Lasya, which is graceful and delicate and expresses emotions on a gentle level and is considered the feminine dance attributed to the goddess Parvati. Lasya is regarded as the female counterpart of Tandava. The Tandava-Lasya dances are associated with the destruction-creation of the world.

Dakshinamurti (Sanskrit दक्षिणामूर्ति; Dakṣiṇāmūrti, "[facing] south form") represents Shiva in his aspect as a teacher of yoga, music, and wisdom and giving exposition on the shastras. Dakshinamurti is depicted as a figure seated upon a deer-throne surrounded by sages receiving instruction. Dakshinamurti's depiction in Indian art is mostly restricted to Tamil Nadu.

Bhikshatana (Sanskrit भिक्षाटन; Bhikṣāṭana, "wandering about for alms, mendicancy") depicts Shiva as a divine medicant. He is depicted as a nude four-armed man adorned with ornaments who holds a begging bowl in his hand and is followed by demonic attendants. He is associated with his penance for committing brahmicide as Bhirava and with his encounters with the sages and their wives in the Deodar forest.

Tripurantaka (Sanskrit त्रिपुरांतक; Tripurāntaka, "ender of Tripura") is associated with his destruction of the three cities (Tripura) of the Asuras. He is depicted with four arms, the upper pair holding an axe and a deer, and the lower pair wielding a bow and arrow.

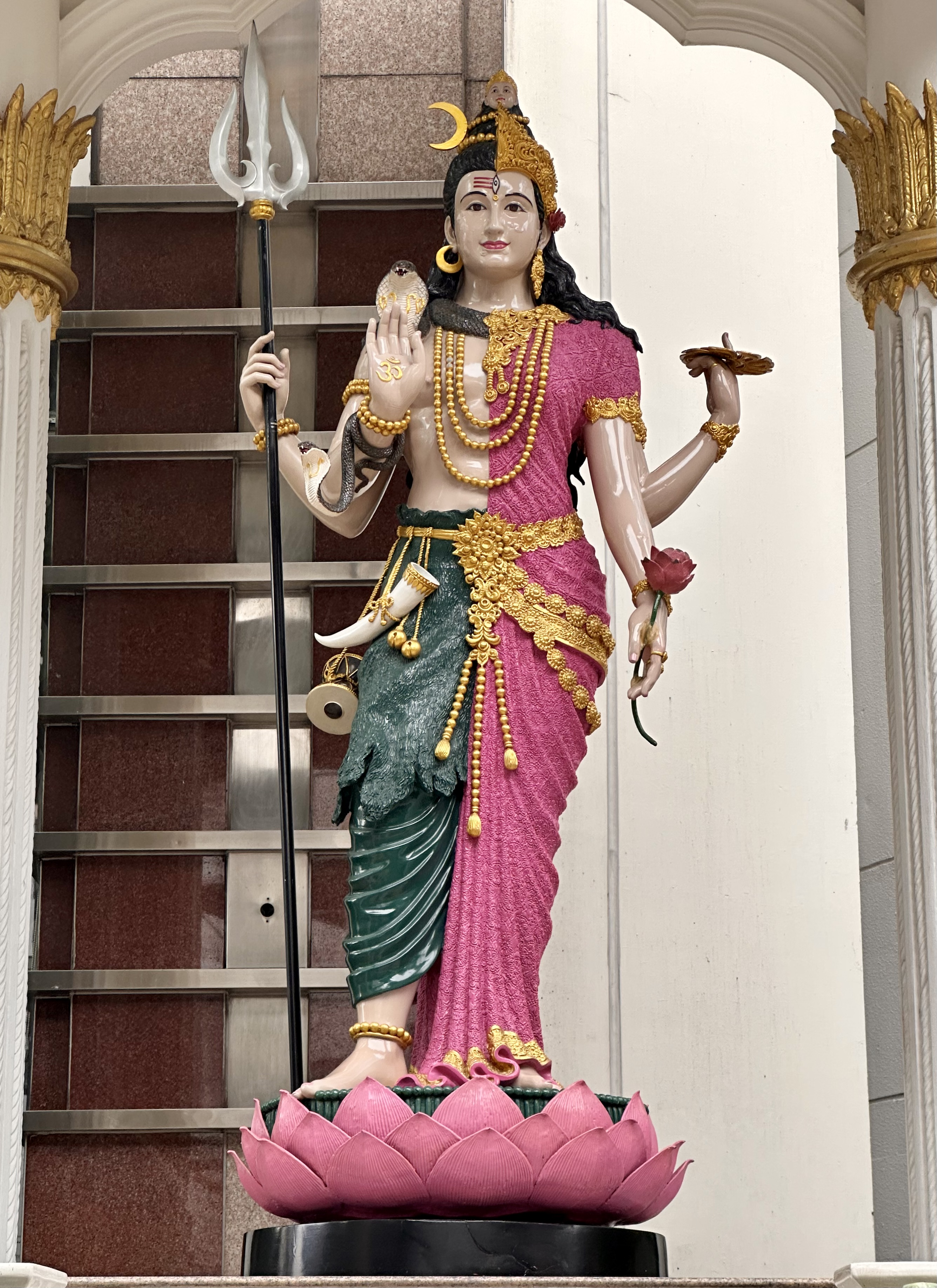
Ardhanarishvara form of Shiva, a statue in Bangkok (2025)

Ardhanarishvara (Sanskrit: अर्धनारीश्वर; Ardhanārīśvara, "the lord who is half woman") is conjunct form of Shiva with Parvati. Adhanarishvara is depicted with one half of the body as male and the other half as female. Ardhanarishvara represents the synthesis of masculine and feminine energies of the universe (Purusha and Prakriti) and illustrates how Shakti, the female principle of God, is inseparable from (or the same as, according to some interpretations) Shiva, the male principle of God, and vice versa.

Kalyanasundara-murti (Sanskrit कल्याणसुन्दर-मूर्ति, literally "icon of beautiful marriage") is the depiction of Shiva's marriage to Parvati. The divine couple are often depicted performing the panigrahana (Sanskrit "accepting the hand") ritual from traditional Hindu wedding ceremonies. The most basic form of this murti consists of only Shiva and Parvati together, but in more elaborate forms they are accompanied by other persons, sometimes including Parvati's parents, as well as deities (often with Vishnu and Lakshmi standing as Parvati's parents, Brahma as the officiating priest, and various other deities as attendants or guests).

Somaskanda is the depiction of Shiva, Parvati, and their son Skanda (Kartikeya), popular during the Pallava Dynasty in southern India.

Astamurti (Sanskrit: अष्टमूर्ति) is an iconographic depiction of Shiva as composed of eight attributes: Rudra, Śarva, Paśupati, Ugra, Aśani, Bhava, Mahādeva, and Īśāna—some of which overlap with Pañcānana, described below.

Pañcānana (Sanskrit: पञ्चानन), also called the pañcabrahma, is a form of Shiva depicting him as having five faces which correspond to his five divine activities (pañcakṛtya): creation (sṛṣṭi), preservation (sthithi), destruction (saṃhāra), concealing grace (tirobhāva), and revealing grace (anugraha). Five is a sacred number for Shiva. One of his most important mantras has five syllables (namaḥ śivāya).

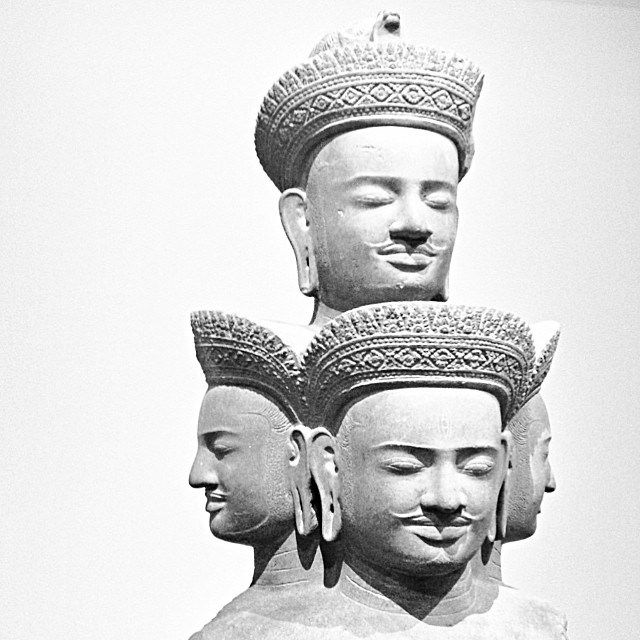
The 10th century five headed Shiva, Sadashiva, Cambodia

- Sadyojāta
- Vāmadeva
- Aghora
- Tatpuruṣa
- Īsāna

Shiva's body is said to consist of five mantras, called the pañcabrahman. As forms of God, each of these have their own names and distinct iconography: These are represented as the five faces of Shiva and are associated in various texts with the five elements, the five senses, the five organs of perception, and the five organs of action. Doctrinal differences and, possibly, errors in transmission, have resulted in some differences between texts in details of how these five forms are linked with various attributes. The overall meaning of these associations is summarised by Stella Kramrisch,

Through these transcendent categories, Śiva, the ultimate reality, becomes the efficient and material cause of all that exists.

According to the Pañcabrahma Upanishad:

One should know all things of the phenomenal world as of a fivefold character, for the reason that the eternal verity of Śiva is of the character of the fivefold Brahman. (Pañcabrahma Upanishad 31)

In the hymn of Manikkavacakar's Thiruvasagam, he testifies that Nataraja Temple, Chidambaram had, by the pre-Chola period, an abstract or 'cosmic' symbolism linked to five elements (Pancha Bhoota) including ether. Nataraja is a significant visual interpretation of Brahman and a dance posture of Shiva. Sharada Srinivasan notes that, Nataraja is described as Satcitananda or "Being, Consciousness and Bliss" in the Shaiva Siddhanta text Kunchitangrim Bhaje, resembling the Advaita doctrine, or "abstract monism", of Adi Shankara, "which holds the individual Self (Jīvātman) and supream Self (Paramātmā) to be one," while "an earlier hymn to Nataraja by Manikkavachakar identifies him with the unitary supreme consciousness, by using Tamil word Or Unarve, rather than Sanskrit Chit." This may point to an "osmosis" of ideas in medieval India, states Srinivasan.

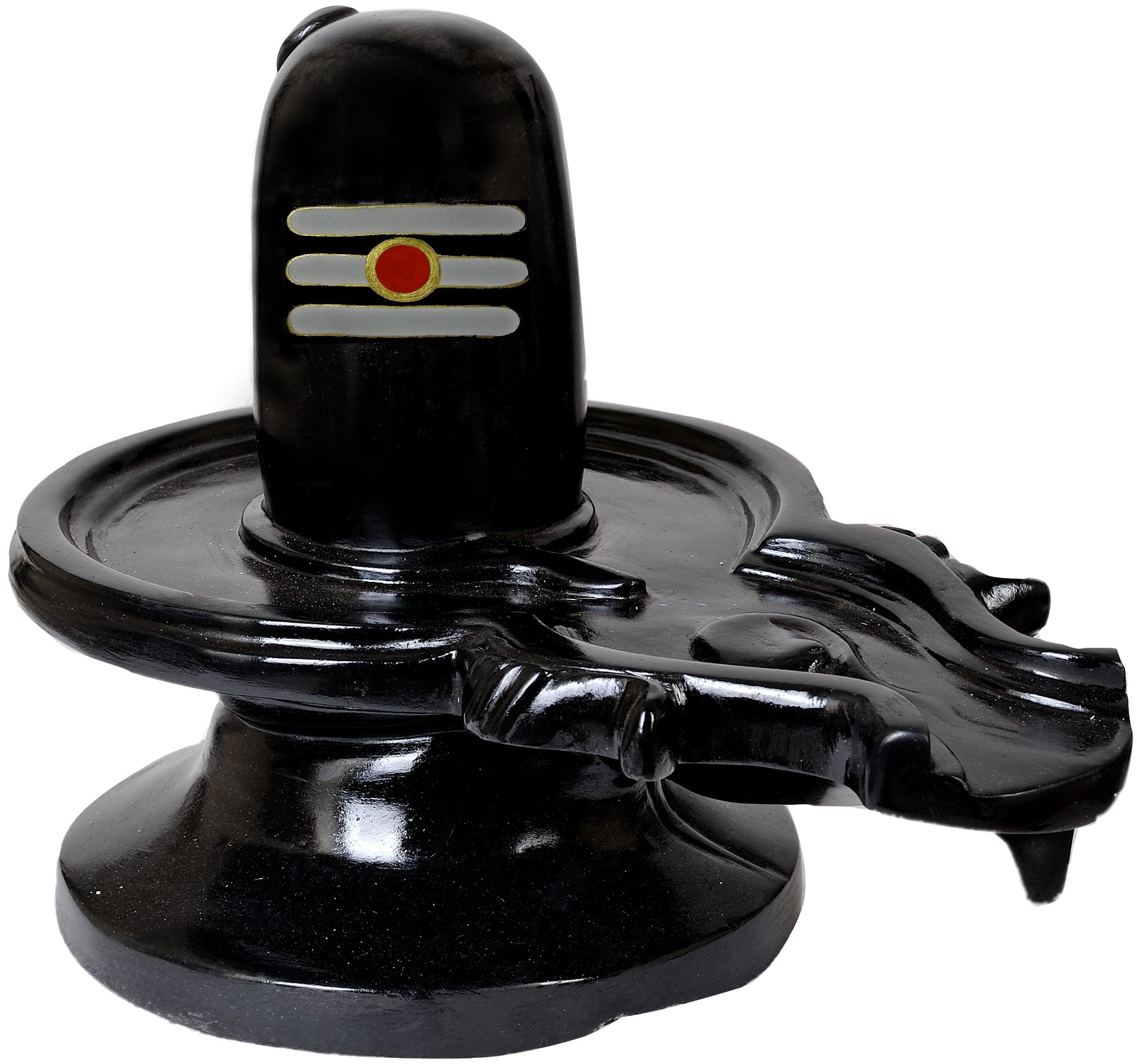
Shiva Lingam with tripundra

=== Lingam ===
The Linga Purana states, "Shiva is signless, without color, taste, smell, that is beyond word or touch, without quality, motionless and changeless". The source of the universe is the signless, and all of the universe is the manifested Linga, a union of unchanging Principles and the ever changing nature. The Linga Purana and the Shiva Gita texts builds on this foundation. Linga, states Alain Daniélou, means sign. It is an important concept in Hindu texts, wherein Linga is a manifested sign and nature of someone or something. It accompanies the concept of Brahman, which as invisible signless and existent Principle, is formless or linga-less.

The Shvetashvatara Upanishad states one of the three significations, the primary one, of Lingam as "the imperishable Purusha", the absolute reality, where says the linga as "sign", a mark that provides the existence of Brahman, thus the original meaning as "sign". Furthermore, it says "Shiva, the Supreme Lord, has no liūga", liuga (Sanskrit: लिऊग IAST: liūga) meaning Shiva is transcendent, beyond any characteristic and, specifically the sign of gender.

Apart from anthropomorphic images of Shiva, he is also represented in aniconic form of a lingam. These are depicted in various designs. One common form is the shape of a vertical rounded column in the centre of a lipped, disk-shaped object, the yoni, symbolism for the goddess Shakti. In Shiva temples, the linga is typically present in its sanctum sanctorum and is the focus of votary offerings such as milk, water, flower petals, fruit, fresh leaves, and rice. According to Monier Williams and Yudit Greenberg, linga literally means 'mark, sign or emblem', and also refers to a "mark or sign from which the existence of something else can be reliably inferred". It implies the regenerative divine energy innate in nature, symbolised by Shiva.

Some scholars, such as Wendy Doniger, view linga as merely a phallic symbol, although this interpretation is criticised by others, including Swami Vivekananda, Sivananda Saraswati, Stella Kramrisch, Swami Agehananda Bharati, S. N. Balagangadhara, and others. According to Moriz Winternitz, the linga in the Shiva tradition is "only a symbol of the productive and creative principle of nature as embodied in Shiva", and it has no historical trace in any obscene phallic cult. According to Sivananda Saraswati, westerners who are curiously passionate and have impure understanding or intelligence, incorrectly assume Siva Linga as a phallus or sex organ. Later on, Sivananda Saraswati mentions that, this is not only a serious mistake, but also a grave blunder.

The worship of the lingam originated from the famous hymn in the Atharva-Veda Samhitâ sung in praise of the Yupa-Stambha, the sacrificial post. In that hymn, a description is found of the beginningless and endless Stambha or Skambha, and it is shown that the said Skambha is put in place of the eternal Brahman. Just as the Yajna (sacrificial) fire, its smoke, ashes, and flames, the Soma plant, and the ox that used to carry on its back the wood for the Vedic sacrifice gave place to the conceptions of the brightness of Shiva's body, his tawny matted hair, his blue throat, and the riding on the bull of the Shiva, the Yupa-Skambha gave place in time to the Shiva-Linga. In the text Linga Purana, the same hymn is expanded in the shape of stories, meant to establish the glory of the great Stambha and the superiority of Shiva as Mahadeva.

The oldest known archaeological linga as an icon of Shiva is the Gudimallam lingam from 3rd-century BCE. In Shaivism pilgrimage tradition, twelve major temples of Shiva are called Jyotirlinga, which means "linga of light", and these are located across India.

=== Avatars ===
Puranic scriptures contain occasional references to "ansh" – literally 'portion, or avatars of Shiva', but the idea of Shiva avatars is not universally accepted in Shaivism. The Linga Purana mentions twenty-eight forms of Shiva which are sometimes seen as avatars, however such mention is unusual and the avatars of Shiva is relatively rare in Shaivism compared to the well emphasised concept of Vishnu avatars in Vaishnavism. Some Vaishnava literature reverentially link Shiva to characters in its Puranas. For example, in the Hanuman Chalisa, Hanuman is identified as the eleventh avatar of Shiva. The Bhagavata Purana and the Vishnu Purana claim sage Durvasa to be a portion of Shiva. Some medieval era writers have called the Advaita Vedanta philosopher Adi Shankara an incarnation of Shiva.

== Festivals ==
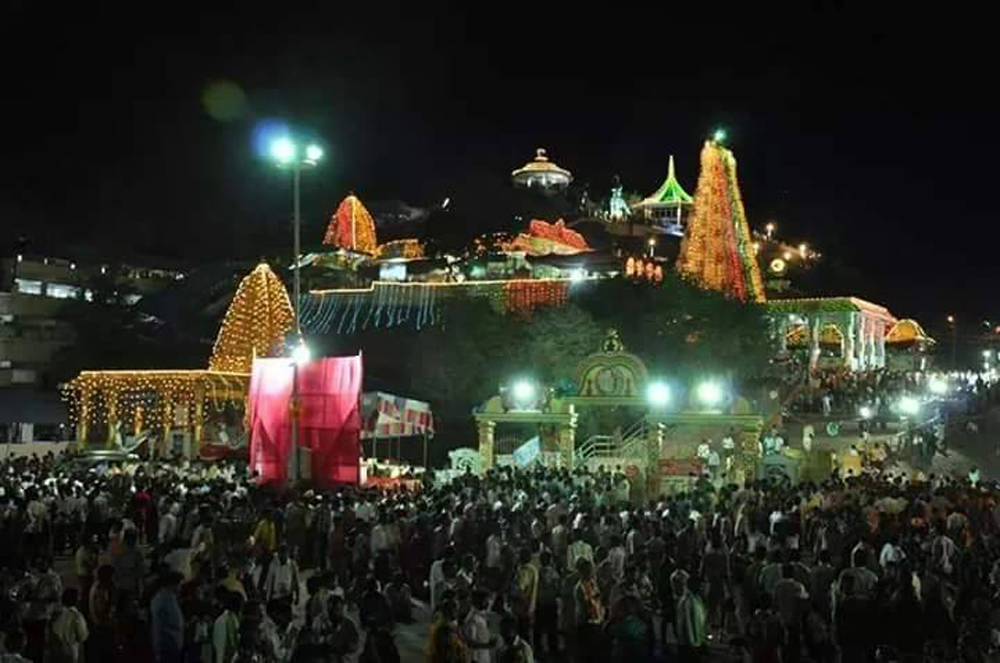
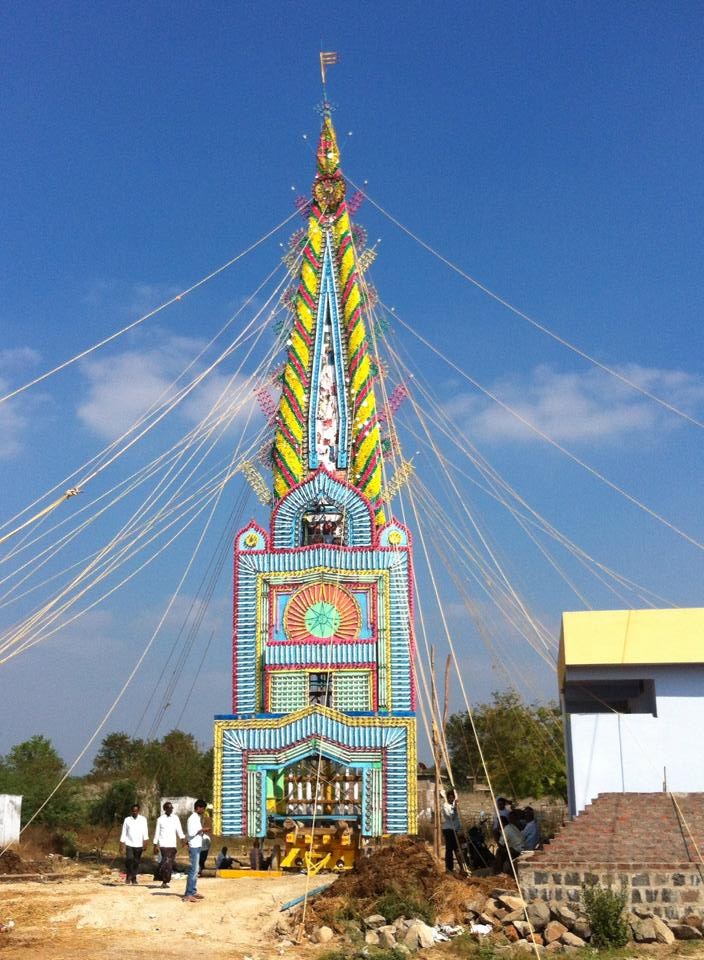
Maha Shivaratri festival is observed in the night, usually in lighted temples or special prabha (above).

There is a Shivaratri in every lunar month on its 13th night/14th day, but once a year in late winter (February/March) and before the arrival of spring, marks Maha Shivaratri which means "the Great Night of Shiva".

Maha Shivaratri is a major Hindu festival, but one that is solemn and theologically marks a remembrance of "overcoming darkness and ignorance" in life and the world, and meditation about the polarities of existence, of Shiva and a devotion to humankind. It is observed by reciting Shiva-related poems, chanting prayers, remembering Shiva, fasting, doing Yoga and meditating on ethics and virtues such as self-restraint, honesty, noninjury to others, forgiveness, introspection, self-repentance and the discovery of Shiva. The ardent devotees keep awake all night. Others visit one of the Shiva temples or go on pilgrimage to Jyotirlingam shrines. Those who visit temples, offer milk, fruits, flowers, fresh leaves and sweets to the lingam. Some communities organise special dance events, to mark Shiva as the lord of dance, with individual and group performances. According to Jones and Ryan, Maha Sivaratri is an ancient Hindu festival which probably originated around the 5th-century.

Another major festival involving Shiva worship is Kartik Purnima, commemorating Shiva's victory over the three demons known as Tripurasura. Across India, various Shiva temples are illuminated throughout the night. Shiva icons are carried in procession in some places.

Thiruvathira is a festival observed in Kerala dedicated to Shiva. It is believed that on this day, Parvati met Shiva after her long penance and Shiva took her as his wife. On this day Hindu women performs the Thiruvathirakali accompanied by Thiruvathira paattu (folk songs about Parvati and her longing and penance for Shiva's affection).

Regional festivals dedicated to Shiva include the Chithirai festival in Madurai around April/May, one of the largest festivals in South India, celebrating the wedding of Minakshi (Parvati) and Shiva. The festival is one where both the Vaishnava and Shaiva communities join the celebrations, because Vishnu gives away his sister Minakshi in marriage to Shiva.

Some Shaktism-related festivals revere Shiva along with the goddess considered primary and Supreme. These include festivals dedicated to Annapurna such as Annakuta and those related to Durga. In Himalayan regions such as Nepal, as well as in northern, central and western India, the festival of Teej is celebrated by girls and women in the monsoon season, in honour of goddess Parvati, with group singing, dancing and by offering prayers in Parvati-Shiva temples.

The ascetic, Vedic and Tantric sub-traditions related to Shiva, such as those that became ascetic warriors during the Islamic rule period of India, celebrate the Kumbha Mela festival. This festival cycles every 12 years, in four pilgrimage sites within India, with the event moving to the next site after a gap of three years. The biggest is in Prayaga (renamed Allahabad during the Mughal rule era), where millions of Hindus of different traditions gather at the confluence of rivers Ganges and Yamuna. In the Hindu tradition, the Shiva-linked ascetic warriors (Nagas) get the honour of starting the event by entering the Sangam first for bathing and prayers.

In Pakistan, major Shivaratri celebration occurs at the Umarkot Shiv Mandir in the Umarkot. The three-day Shivarathri celebration at the temple is attended by around 250,000 people.

== Beyond the Indian subcontinent and Hinduism ==
=== Indonesia ===
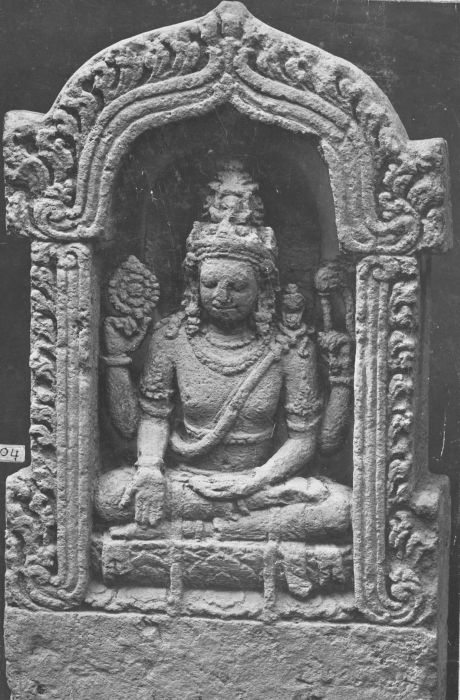
Shiva sculpture, Dieng Plateau in Java, Indonesia

In Indonesian Shaivism the popular name for Shiva has been Batara Guru, which is derived from Sanskrit Bhattāraka which means "noble lord". He is conceptualised as a kind spiritual teacher, the first of all Gurus in Indonesian Hindu texts, mirroring the Dakshinamurti aspect of Shiva in the Indian subcontinent. However, the Batara Guru has more aspects than the Indian Shiva, as the Indonesian Hindus blended their spirits and heroes with him. Batara Guru's wife in Southeast Asia is the same Hindu deity Durga, who has been popular since ancient times, and she too has a complex character with benevolent and fierce manifestations, each visualised with different names such as Uma, Sri, Kali and others. In contrast to Hindu religious texts, whether Vedas or Puranas, in Javanese puppetry (wayang) books, Batara Guru is the king of the gods who regulates and creates the world system. In the classic book that is used as a reference for the puppeteers, it is said that Sanghyang Manikmaya or Batara Guru was created from a sparkling light by Sang Hyang Tunggal, along with the blackish light which is the origin of Ismaya. Shiva has been called Sadāśiva, Paramasiva, Mahādeva in benevolent forms, and Kāla, Bhairava, Mahākāla in his fierce forms.

The Indonesian Hindu texts present the same philosophical diversity of Shaivite traditions found in the Indian subcontinent. However, among the texts that have survived into the contemporary era, the more common are of those of Shaiva Siddhanta (locally also called Siwa Siddhanta, Sridanta).

During the pre-Islamic period on the island of Java, Shaivism and Buddhism were considered very close and allied religions, though not identical religions. The medieval-era Indonesian literature equates Buddha with Siwa (Shiva) and Janardana (Vishnu). This tradition continues in predominantly Hindu Bali Indonesia in the modern era, where Buddha is considered the younger brother of Shiva.

=== Central Asia ===
The worship of Shiva became popular in Central Asia through the influence of the Hephthalite Empire and Kushan Empire. Shaivism was also popular in Sogdia and the Kingdom of Yutian as found from the wall painting from Penjikent on the river Zervashan. In this depiction, Shiva is portrayed with a sacred halo and a sacred thread (Yajnopavita). He is clad in tiger skin while his attendants are wearing Sogdian dress. A panel from Dandan Oilik shows Shiva in His Trimurti form with Shakti kneeling on her right thigh. Another site in the Taklamakan Desert depicts him with four legs, seated cross-legged on a cushioned seat supported by two bulls. It is also noted that the Zoroastrian wind god Vayu-Vata took on the iconographic appearance of Shiva.

=== Sikhism ===
The Japuji Sahib of the Guru Granth Sahib says: "The Guru is Shiva, the Guru is Vishnu and Brahma; the Guru is Paarvati and Lakhshmi." In the same chapter, it also says: "Shiva speaks, and the Siddhas listen." In Dasam Granth, Guru Gobind Singh has mentioned two avatars of Rudra: Dattatreya Avatar and Parasnath Avatar.

=== Buddhism ===
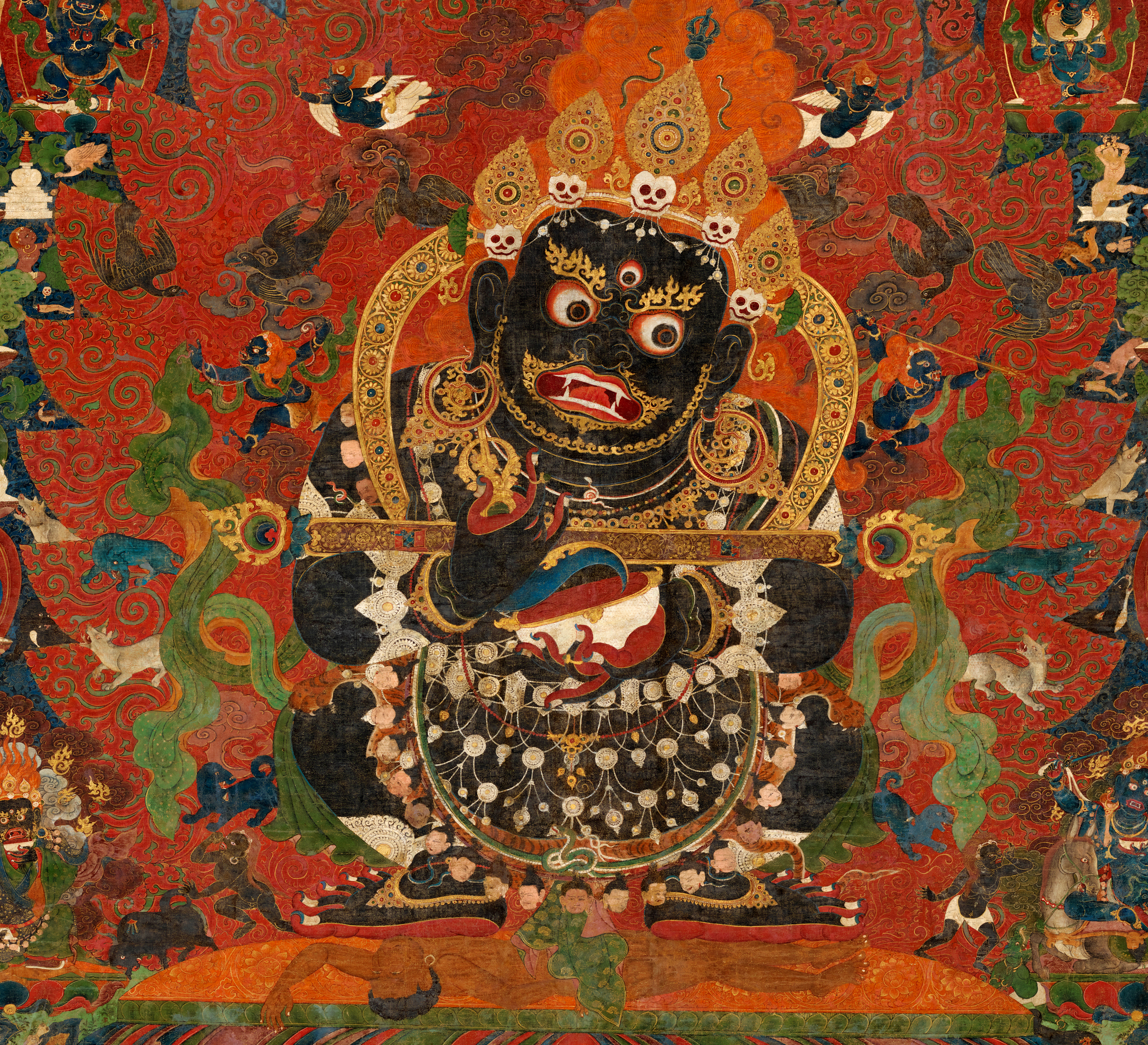
Mahakala, c. 1500 CE Tibetan Thangka

The Siva Sutta of the Samyutta Nikaya depicts Shiva as conversing with the Buddha and reciting a gatha. Shiva is mentioned in the Buddhist Tantras and worshipped as the fierce deity Mahākāla in Vajrayana, Chinese Esoteric, and Tibetan Buddhism. In the cosmologies of Buddhist Tantras, Shiva is depicted as passive, with Shakti being his active counterpart: Shiva as Prajña and Shakti as Upāya.

In Mahayana Buddhism, Shiva is depicted as Maheshvara, a deva living in Akanishta Devaloka. In Theravada Buddhism, Shiva is depicted as Ishana, a deva residing in the 6th heaven of Kamadhatu along with Sakra Indra. In Vajrayana Buddhism, Shiva is depicted as Mahakala, a dharma protecting Bodhisattva. In most forms of Buddhism, the position of Shiva is lesser than that of Mahabrahma or Sakra Indra. In Mahayana Buddhist texts, Shiva (Maheshvara) becomes a buddha called Bhasmeshvara Buddha ("Buddha of ashes").

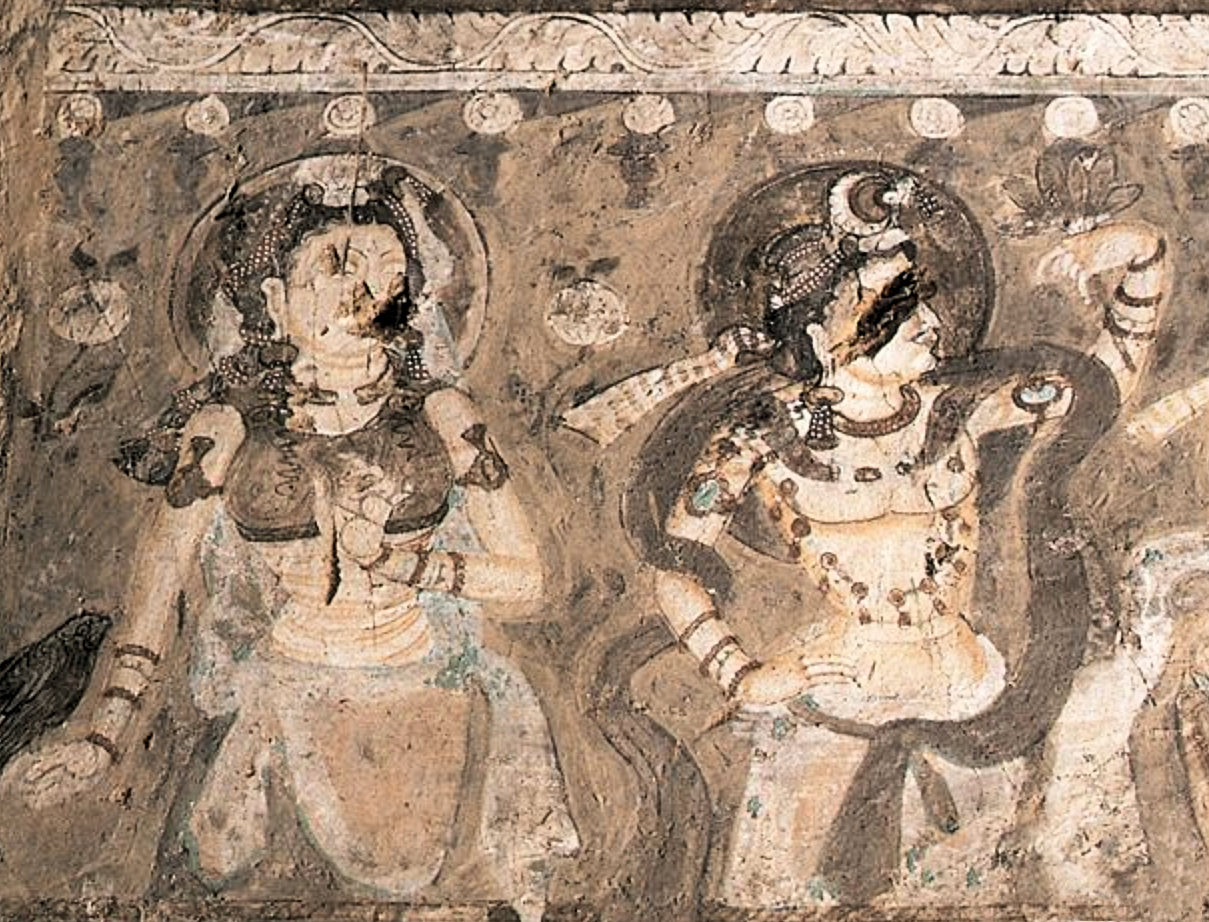
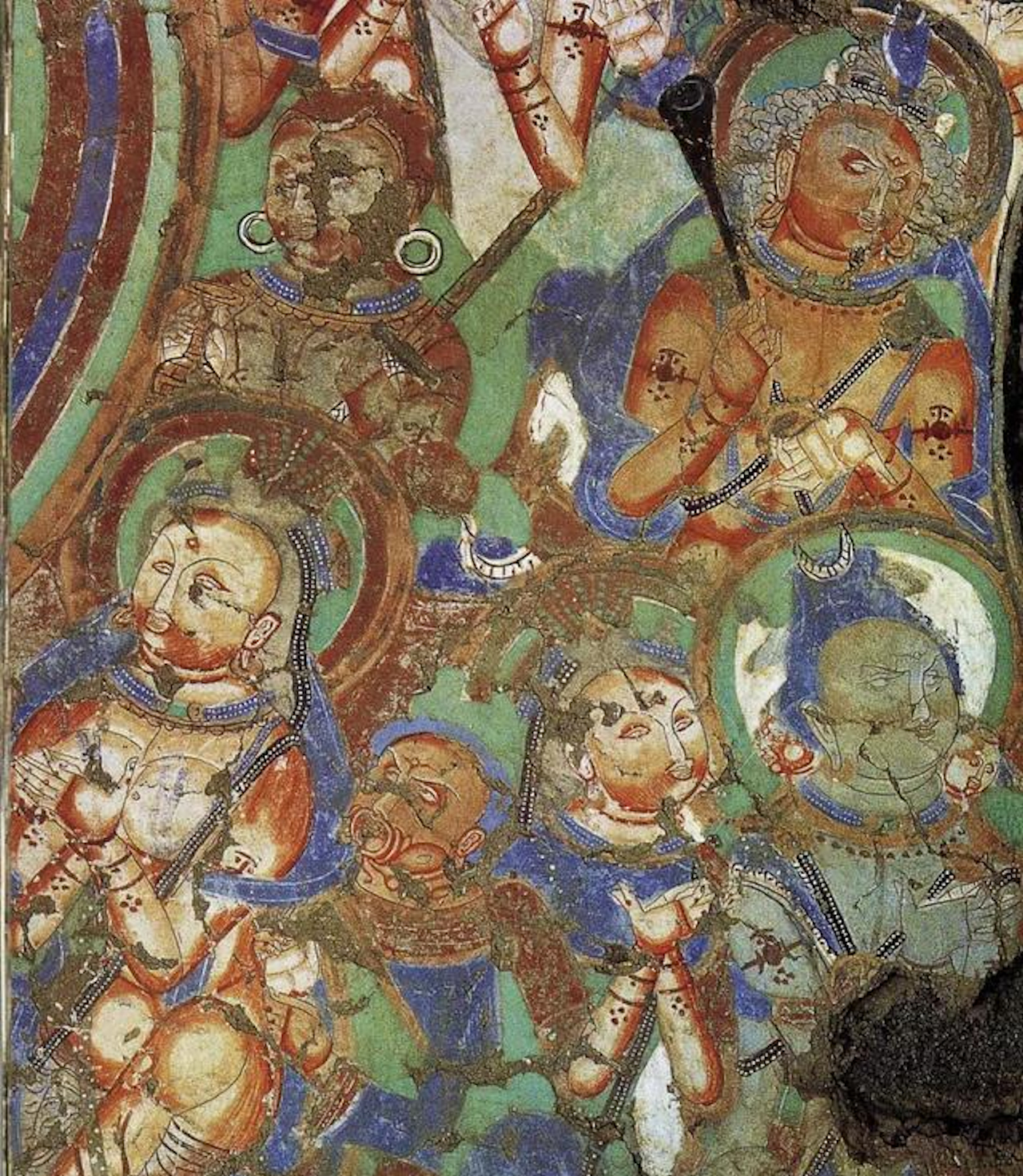
Paintings of Shiva and Parvati in Kizil Caves, Xinjiang, China. The two are at the bottom right of the bottom image

In China and Taiwan, Shiva, better known there as Maheśvara (Chinese: 大自在天; pinyin: Dàzìzàitiān; or Chinese: 摩醯首羅天 pinyin: Móxīshǒuluótiān) is considered one of the Twenty Devas (Chinese: 二十諸天, pinyin: Èrshí Zhūtiān) or the Twenty-Four Devas (Chinese: 二十四諸天, pinyin: Èrshísì zhūtiān) who are a group of dharmapalas that manifest to protect the Buddhist dharma. Statues of him are often enshrined in the Mahavira Halls of Chinese Buddhist temples along with the other devas. In Kizil Caves in Xinjiang, there are numerous caves that depict Shiva in the buddhist shrines through wall paintings. In addition, he is also regarded as one of thirty-three manifestations of Avalokitesvara in the Lotus Sutra. In Mahayana Buddhist cosmology, Maheśvara resides in Akaniṣṭha, highest of the Śuddhāvāsa ("Pure Abodes") wherein Anāgāmi ("Non-returners") who are already on the path to Arhathood and who will attain enlightenment are born.

Daikokuten, one of the Seven Lucky Gods in Japan, is considered to be evolved from Shiva. The god enjoys an exalted position as a household deity in Japan and is worshipped as the god of wealth and fortune. The name is the Japanese equivalent of Mahākāla, the Buddhist name for Shiva.

Shiva has been merged with Buddhist deities in East Asian Buddhism
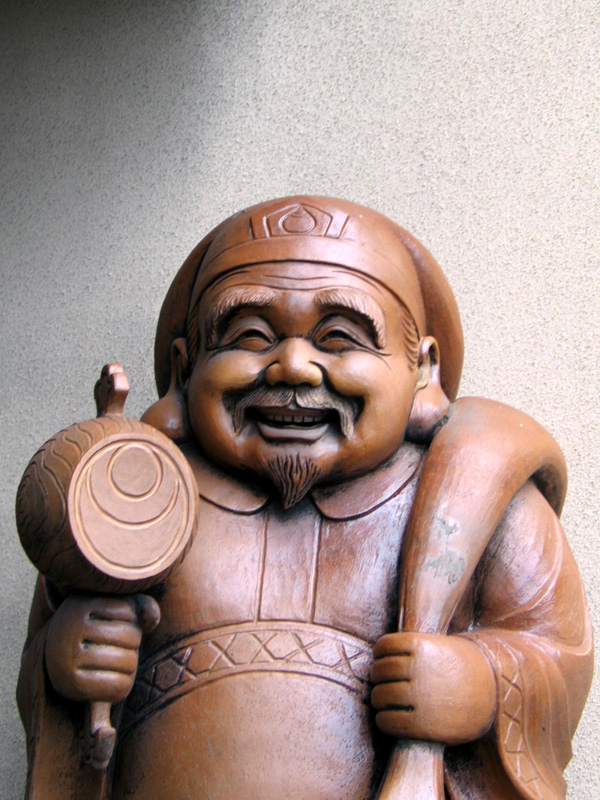
Daikokuten is a Shiva-Ōkuninushi fusion deity in Japan

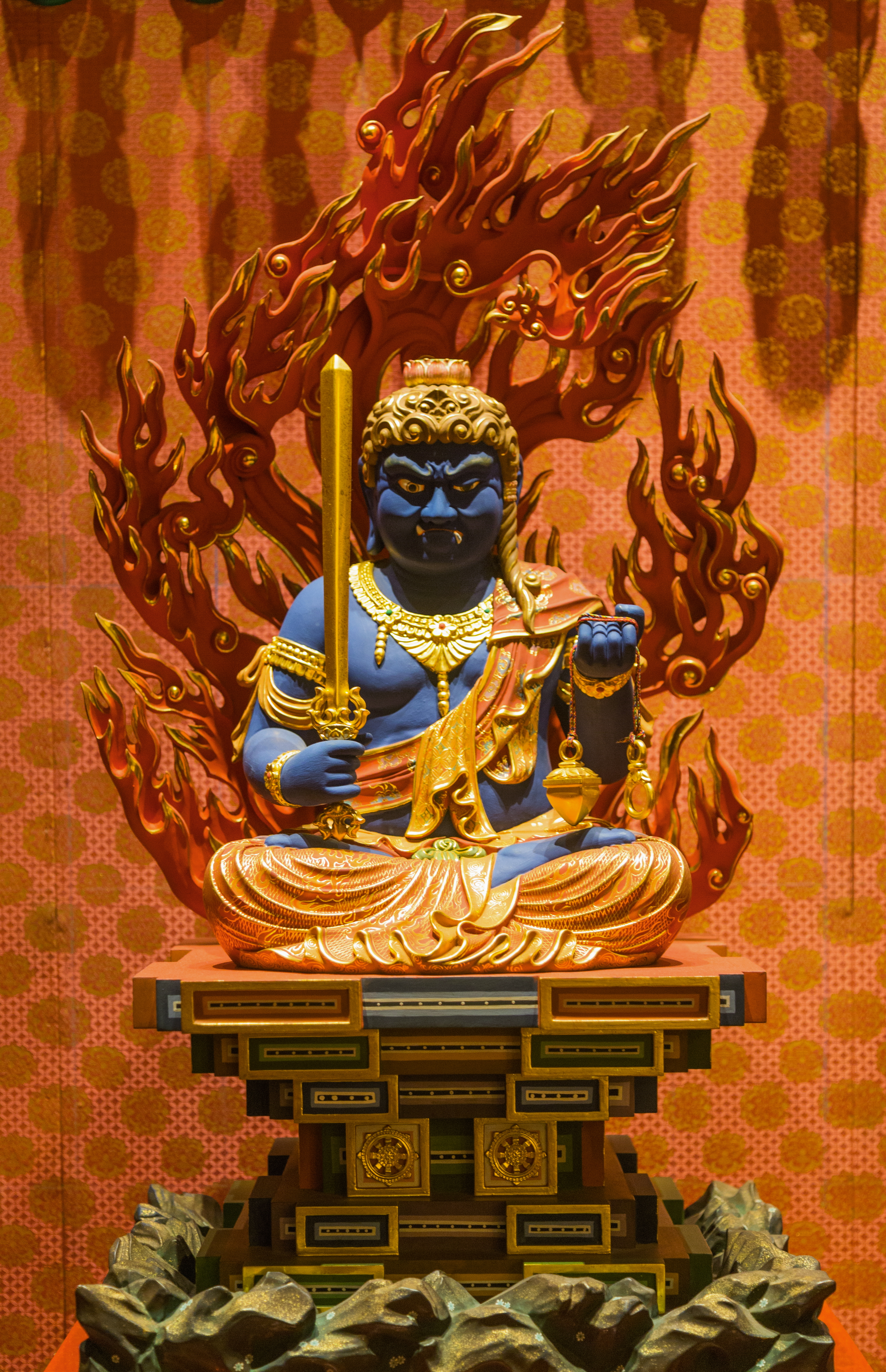
Acala is a fierce Shiva adaptation in both China and Japan

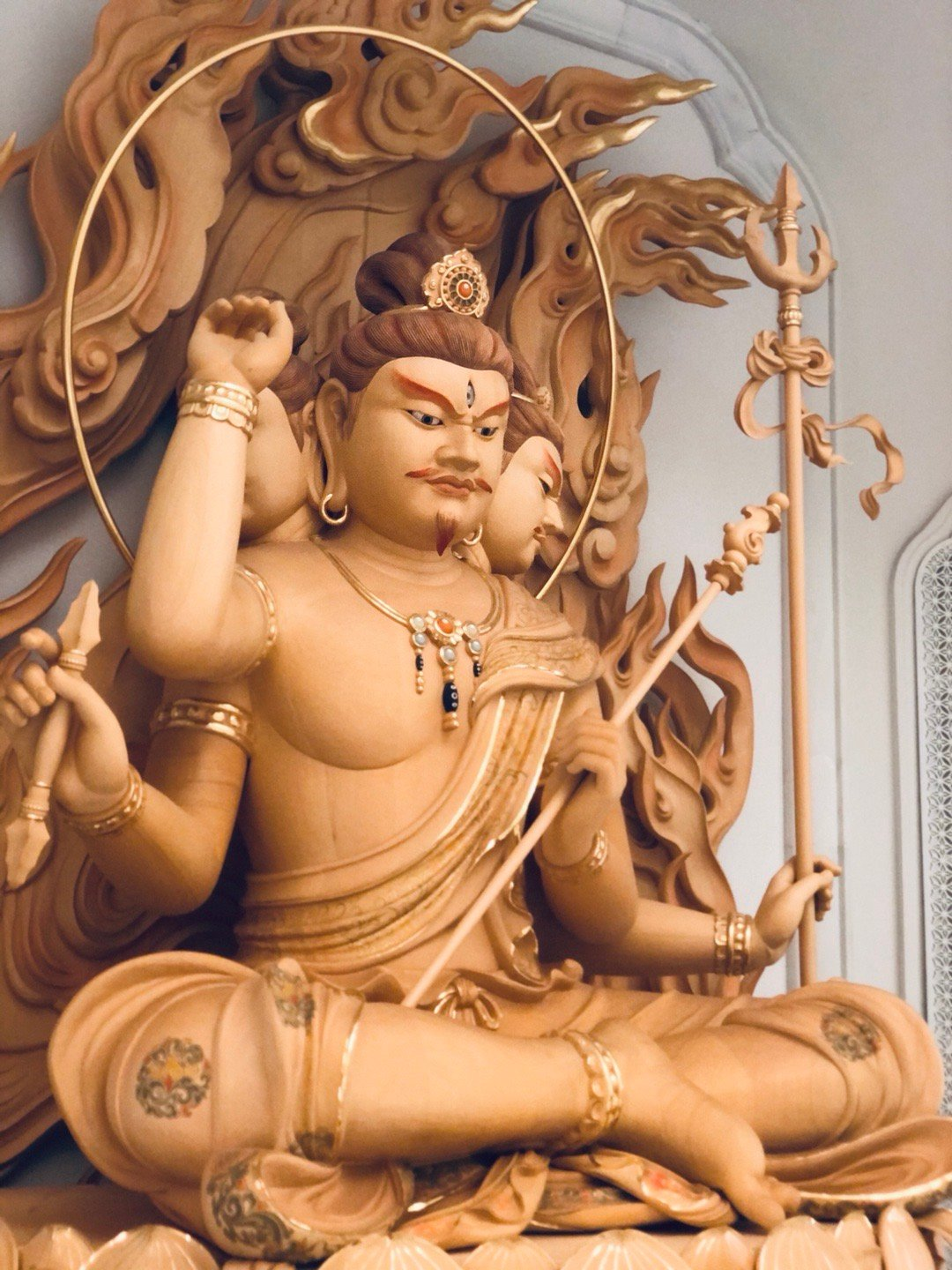
Statue of Shiva depicted as a Chinese Buddhist deva on Mount Putuo Guanyin Dharma Realm in Zhejiang, China

== In popular culture ==
In contemporary culture, Shiva is depicted in art, films, and books. He has been referred to as "the god of cool things" and a "bonafide rock hero". One popular film was the 1967 Kannada movie Gange Gowri.

In the novel series The Destroyer one of the main characters, Remo Williams, is Shiva's avatar.

A 1990s television series of DD National titled Om Namah Shivay was also based on legends of Shiva. Amish Tripathi's 2010 book Shiva Trilogy has sold over a million copies. Devon Ke Dev...Mahadev (2011–2014), a television serial about Shiva on the Life OK channel was among the most watched shows at its peak popularity. Another popular film was the 2022 Gujarati language movie Har Har Mahadev.

Shiva was also featured in the manga Record of Ragnarok (Japanese: 終末のワルキューレ, Shūmatsu no Warukyūre) by Shinya Umemura and Takumi Fukui. In the series, Shiva serves as a fighter for the Gods. Despite making an appearance in the series, the show was banned in India due to the series's controversial portrayal of Shiva.

== See also ==
- Shiva temples

== Sources ==
=== Primary ===
- Chinmayananda, Swami (2002). Vishnusahasranama. Central Chinmaya Mission Trust. ISBN 978-8175972452. Archived from the original on 31 March 2024.
- Dutt, Manmatha Nath (1905). A Prose English Translation of the Mahabharata: (translated Literally from the Original Sanskrit Text). Anushasana Parva, Volume 13. Calcutta: Dass, Elysium Press.
- Ganguli, Kisari Mohan (2004). Mahabharata of Krishna-Dwaipayana Vyasa. Munshirm Manoharlal Pub Pvt Ltd. ISBN 8121505933.
- Śrī Viṣṇu sahasranāma : with text, transliteration, translation and commentary of Śrī Śaṅkarācārya. Madras: Sri Ramakrishna Math. 1986. ISBN 978-8171204205.

=== Secondary ===
- Anthony, David W. (2007). The Horse, the Wheel, and Language: How Bronze-Age Riders from the Eurasian Steppes Shaped the Modern World. Princeton University Press. ISBN 978-0691058870. Archived from the original on 31 March 2024.
- Apte, Vaman Shivram (1965). The Practical Sanskrit Dictionary (Fourth revised and enlarged ed.). Delhi: Motilal Banarsidass Publishers. ISBN 8120805674.
- Arya, Ravi Prakash; Joshi, K. L. (2001). Ṛgveda Saṃhitā: Sanskrit Text, English Translation. Delhi: Parimal Publications. ASIN B008RXWY7O (Set of four volumes). Parimal Sanskrit Series No. 45; 2003 reprint: ISBN 8170200709.
- Beckwith, Christopher I. (2009). Empires of the Silk Road. Princeton University Press.
- Berreman, Gerald Duane (1963). Hindus of the Himalayas. University of California Press.
- Blurton, T. Richard (1993). Hindu Art. Harvard University Press. ISBN 978-0674391895. Archived from the original on 15 January 2023.
- Bongard-Levin, Grigoriĭ Maksimovich (1985). Ancient Indian Civilization. Arnold-Heinemann.
- Boon, James A. (1977). The Anthropological Romance of Bali 1597–1972. Cambridge University Press. ISBN 978-0521213981.
- Brown, Cheever Mackenzie (1998). The Devi Gita: The Song of the Goddess: A Translation, Annotation, and Commentary. SUNY Press. ISBN 978-0791439395.
- Chakravarti, Mahadev (1986). The Concept of Rudra-Śiva Through The Ages (Second Revised ed.). Delhi: Motilal Banarsidass. ISBN 8120800532.
- Sitansu S. Chakravarti (1991). Hinduism, a Way of Life. Motilal Banarsidass. ISBN 978-8120808997.
- Suresh Chandra (1998). Encyclopaedia of Hindu Gods and Goddesses. Sarup & Sons. ISBN 978-8176250399.
- Chidbhavananda, Swami (1997). Siva Sahasranama Stotram: With Navavali, Introduction, and English Rendering. Sri Ramakrishna Tapovanam. ISBN 8120805674. (Third edition). The version provided by Chidbhavananda is from chapter 17 of the Anuśāsana Parva of the Mahābharata.
- Coburn, Thomas B. (1991). Encountering the Goddess: A translation of the Devi-Mahatmya and a Study of Its Interpretation. State University of New York Press. ISBN 0791404463.
- Coburn, Thomas B. (2002). Devī Māhātmya, The Crystallization of the Goddess Tradition. South Asia Books. ISBN 8120805577.
- Courtright, Paul B. (1985). Gaṇeśa: Lord of Obstacles, Lord of Beginnings. New York: Oxford University Press. ISBN 0195057422.
- Cush, Denise; Robinson, Catherine A.; York, Michael (2008). Encyclopedia of Hinduism. Routledge. ISBN 978-0700712670. Archived from the original on 21 April 2023.
- Dalal, Roshen (2010). Hinduism: An Alphabetical Guide. Penguin Books. ISBN 978-0143414216.
- Davis, Richard H. (1992). Ritual in an Oscillating Universe: Worshipping Śiva in Medieval India. Princeton, New Jersey: Princeton University Press. ISBN 978-0691073866.
- Deussen, Paul (1997). Sixty Upanishads of the Veda. Motilal Banarsidass. ISBN 978-8120814677.
- Flood, Gavin (1996). An Introduction to Hinduism. Cambridge: Cambridge University Press. ISBN 0521438780.
- Flood, Gavin (2003). "The Śaiva Traditions". In Flood, Gavin (ed.). The Blackwell Companion to Hinduism. Malden, MA: Blackwell Publishing. ISBN 1405132515.
- Frawley, David. 2015. Shiva: the lord of yoga. Twin Lakes, WI : Lotus Press.
- Fuller, Christopher John (2004). The Camphor Flame: Popular Hinduism and society in India. Princeton, New Jersey: Princeton University Press. ISBN 978-0691120485.
- Ghose, Rajeshwari (1966). Saivism in Indonesia During the Hindu-Javanese Period. University of Hong Kong.
- Goldberg, Ellen (2002). The Lord Who is Half Woman: Ardhanārīśvara in Indian and Feminist Perspective. Albany: State University of New York Press. ISBN 079145326X.
- Gonda, Jan (1969). "The Hindu Trinity". Anthropos. 63/64 (1/2): 212–226. ISSN 0257-9774. JSTOR 40457085.
- Gonda, Jan (1975). Handbook of Oriental Studies. Section 3 Southeast Asia, Religions. Brill Academic. ISBN 9004043306.
- Granoff, Phyllis (2003). "Mahakala's Journey: from Gana to God". Rivista degli studi orientali. 77, Fasc. 1/4 (1/4): 95–114. JSTOR 41913237.
- Griffith, T. H. (1973). The Hymns of the Ṛgveda (New Revised ed.). Delhi: Motilal Banarsidass. ISBN 812080046X.
- Gupta, Shakti M. (1988). Karttikeya: The Son of Shiva. Bombay: Somaiya Publications Pvt. Ltd. ISBN 8170391865.
- Hiriyanna, M. (2000). The Essentials of Indian Philosophy. Motilal Banarsidass. ISBN 978-8120813304.
- Hopkins (1968). n.t.
- Hopkins, E. Washburn (1969) [1915]. Epic Mythology. New York: Biblo and Tannen.
- Hopkins, Keith (July 2001). A World Full of Gods: The Strange Triumph of Christianity. New York: Plume. ISBN 0-452-28261-6. OCLC 47286228.
- Hume, Robert (1921). "Shvetashvatara Upanishad". The Thirteen Principal Upanishads. Oxford University Press.
- Issitt, Micah Lee; Main, Carlyn (2014). Hidden Religion: The Greatest Mysteries and Symbols of the World's Religious Beliefs. ABC-CLIO. ISBN 978-1610694780.
- Jansen, Eva Rudy (1993). The Book of Hindu Imagery. Havelte, Holland: Binkey Kok Publications BV. ISBN 9074597076.
- Javid, Ali (2008). World Heritage Monuments and Related Edifices in India. Algora Publishing. ISBN 978-0875864846.
- Jones, Constance; Ryan, James D. (2006). Encyclopedia of Hinduism. Infobase. ISBN 978-0816075645. Archived from the original on 20 October 2022.
- Keay, John (2000). India: A History. New York: Grove Press. ISBN 0802137970. Archived from the original on 3 July 2023.
- Kenoyer, Jonathan Mark (1998). Ancient Cities of the Indus Valley Civilization. Karachi: Oxford University Press.
- Kinsley, David (1988). Hindu Goddesses: Visions of the Divine Feminine in the Hindu Religious Tradition. University of California Press. ISBN 978-0520908833.
- Kinsley, David (1998). Hindu Goddesses: Visions of the Divine Feminine in the Hindu Religious Tradition. Motilal Banarsidass Publ. ISBN 978-8120803947. Archived from the original on 11 January 2023.
- Klostermaier, Klaus K. (1984). Mythologies and Philosophies of Salvation in the Theistic Traditions of India. Wilfrid Laurier University Press. ISBN 978-0889201583.
- Kramrisch, Stella (1981). Manifestations of Shiva. Philadelphia Museum of Art. ISBN 978-0876330395.
- Kramrisch, Stella (1994a). The Presence of Śiva. Princeton, New Jersey: Princeton University Press. ISBN 0691019304.
- Kunst, Arnold (June 1968). "Some notes on the interpretation of the Ṥvetāṥvatara Upaniṣad". Bulletin of the School of Oriental and African Studies. 31 (2): 309–314. doi:10.1017/S0041977X00146531. S2CID 179086253.
- Lochtefeld, James (2002). The Illustrated Encyclopedia of Hinduism, Vol. 1 & 2. Rosen Publishing. ISBN 978-0823931798.
- Long, Bruce (1982). Guy Richard Welbon and Glenn E. Yocum (ed.). Religious Festivals in South India and Sri Lanka (Chapter: "Mahāśivaratri: the Saiva festival of repentance"). Manohar. ISBN 9780836409000.
- Macdonell, Arthur Anthony (1996). A Practical Sanskrit Dictionary. New Delhi: Munshiram Manoharlal Publishers. ISBN 8121507154.
- Mallinson, James (2007). The Shiva Samhita, A critical edition and English translation by James Mallinson. Woodstock, NY: YogVidya. ISBN 978-0971646650.
- Marchand, Peter (2007). The Yoga of Truth: Jnana: The Ancient Path of Silent Knowledge. Rochester, VT: Destiny Books. ISBN 978-1594771651.
- Mate, M. S. (1988). Temples and Legends of Maharashtra. Bombay: Bharatiya Vidya Bhavan.
- McDaniel, June (2004). Offering Flowers, Feeding Skulls : Popular Goddess Worship in West Bengal: Popular Goddess Worship in West Bengal. Oxford University Press. ISBN 978-0195347135.
- Michaels, Axel (2004). Hinduism: Past and Present. Princeton University Press. ISBN 978-0691089522. Archived from the original on 31 March 2024.
- Nath, Vijay (March–April 2001). "From 'Brahmanism' to 'Hinduism': Negotiating the Myth of the Great Tradition". Social Scientist. 29 (3/4): 19–50. doi:10.2307/3518337. JSTOR 3518337.
- Neumayer, Erwin (2013). Prehistoric Rock Art of India. OUP India. ISBN 978-0198060987. Archived from the original on 28 September 2018.
- Owen, Lisa (2012). Carving Devotion in the Jain Caves at Ellora. Brill Academic. ISBN 978-9004206298. Archived from the original on 10 November 2023.
- Pintchman, Tracy (2015). The Rise of the Goddess in the Hindu Tradition. State University of New York Press. ISBN 978-1438416182.
- Pintchman, Tracy (2014). Seeking Mahadevi: Constructing the Identities of the Hindu Great Goddess. State University of New York Press. ISBN 978-0791490495. Archived from the original on 31 March 2024.
- Powell, Robert (2016). Himalayan Drawings. Taylor & Francis. ISBN 978-1317709091.
- Prentiss, Karen Pechilis (2000). The Embodiment of Bhakti. Oxford University Press. ISBN 978-0195351903. Archived from the original on 31 March 2024.
- Rocher, Ludo (1986). The Puranas. Otto Harrassowitz Verlag. ISBN 978-3447025225.
- Rosen, Steven; Schweig, Graham M. (2006). Essential Hinduism. Greenwood Publishing Group.
- Sadasivan, S. N. (2000). A Social History of India. APH Publishing. ISBN 978-8176481700. Archived from the original on 31 March 2024.
- Radhakrishnan, Sarvapalli (1953), The Principal Upanishads, New Delhi: HarperCollins Publishers India (1994 Reprint), ISBN 8172231245
- Sastri, A Mahadeva (1898). Amritabindu and Kaivalya Upanishads with Commentaries. Thomson & Co.
- Sarup, Lakshman (1998) [1927]. The Nighaṇṭu and The Nirukta. Motilal Banarsidass. ISBN 8120813812.
- Scharf, Peter M. (1996). The Denotation of Generic Terms in Ancient Indian Philosophy: Grammar, Nyāya, and Mīmāṃsā. American Philosophical Society. ISBN 978-0871698636.
- Sharma, Arvind (2000). Classical Hindu Thought: An Introduction. Oxford University Press. ISBN 978-0195644418.
- Sharma, Ram Karan (1988). Elements of Poetry in the Mahābhārata (Second ed.). Delhi: Motilal Banarsidass. ISBN 8120805445.
- Sharma, Debabrata Sen (1990). The philosophy of sādhanā : with special reference to the Trika philosophy of Kashmir. Albany: State University of New York Press. ISBN 978-0791403471.
- Sharma, Ram Karan (1996). Śivasahasranāmāṣṭakam: Eight Collections of Hymns Containing One Thousand and Eight Names of Śiva. Delhi: Nag Publishers. ISBN 8170813506. This work compares eight versions of the Śivasahasranāmāstotra with comparative analysis and Śivasahasranāmākoṣa (A Dictionary of Names). The text of the eight versions is given in Sanskrit.
- Singh, S. P. (1989). "Rgvedic Base of the Pasupati Seal of Mohenjo-Daro". Purātattva. 19: 19–26.
- Sircar, Dineschandra (1998). The Śākta Pīṭhas. Motilal Banarsidass. ISBN 978-8120808799.
- Sivaramamurti, C. (1976a). Śatarudrīya: Vibhūti of Śiva's Iconography. Delhi: Abhinav Publications.
- Sivaramamurti, C. (1976b). Gaṅgā. Orient Longman. ISBN 978-0-86125-084-4.
- Sivaraman, K. (1973). Śaivism in Philosophical Perspective: A Study of the Formative Concepts, Problems, and Methods of Śaiva Siddhānta. Motilal Banarsidass. ISBN 978-8120817715. Archived from the original on 31 March 2024.
- Sivaramamurti, C. (2004). Satarudriya: Vibhuti Or Shiva's Iconography. Abhinav Publications. ISBN 978-8170170389.
- Sontheimer, Günther-Dietz (1976). Biroba, Mhaskoba und Khandoba: Ursprung, Geschichte und Umwelt von pastoralen Gottheiten in Maharastra (in German). Franz Steiner.
- Srinivasan, Doris Meth (1997). Many Heads, Arms, and Eyes: Origin, Meaning and Form in Multiplicity in Indian Art. Brill. ISBN 978-9004107588.
- Srinivasan, Sharada (2004). "Shiva as 'cosmic dancer': On Pallava origins for the Nataraja bronze". World Archaeology. Vol. 36. The Journal of Modern Craft. pp. 432–450. doi:10.1080/1468936042000282726821. S2CID 26503807. Archived from the original on 13 June 2022.
- Storl, Wolf-Dieter (2004). Shiva: The Wild God of Power and Ecstasy. Simon and Schuster.
- Stutley, Margaret (1985). The Illustrated Dictionary of Hindu Iconography. First Indian Edition: Munshiram Manoharlal, 2003, ISBN 8121510872.
- Tagare, G. V. (2002). The Pratyabhijñā Philosophy. Motilal Banarsidass. ISBN 978-8120818927.
- Tattwananda, Swami (1984). Vaisnava Sects, Saiva Sects, Mother Worship. Calcutta: Firma KLM Private Ltd. First revised edition.
- Thakur, Upendra (1986). Some Aspects of Asian History and Culture. Abhinav Publications. ISBN 978-8170172079.
- Varenne, Jean (1976). Yoga and the Hindu Tradition. Chicago: The University of Chicago Press. ISBN 0226851168.
- Vohra, Ranbir (2000). The Making of India: A Historical Survey. M.E. Sharpe. ISBN 978-0765607119.
- Warrier, AG Krishna (1967). Śākta Upaniṣads. Adyar Library and Research Center. ISBN 978-0835673181. OCLC 2606086.
- Wayman, Alex; Singh, Jaideva (1991). "Review: A Trident of Wisdom: Translation of Paratrisika-vivarana of Abhinavagupta". Philosophy East and West. 41 (2): 266–268. doi:10.2307/1399778. JSTOR 1399778.
- Williams, Joanna Gottfried (1981). Kalādarśana: American Studies in the Art of India. Brill Academic. ISBN 9004064982. Archived from the original on 16 January 2024.
- Winstedt, Richard (2020). Shaman, Saiva and Sufi: A Study of the Evolution of Malay Magic. Library of Alexandria.
- Zimmer, Heinrich (1972) [1946]. Myths and Symbols in Indian Art and Civilization. Princeton, New Jersey: Princeton University Press. ISBN 0691017786.
- Zimmer, Heinrich (2000). Myths and Symbols in Indian Art and Civilization. Motilal Banarsidass Publishers.
