= Calandbrug =

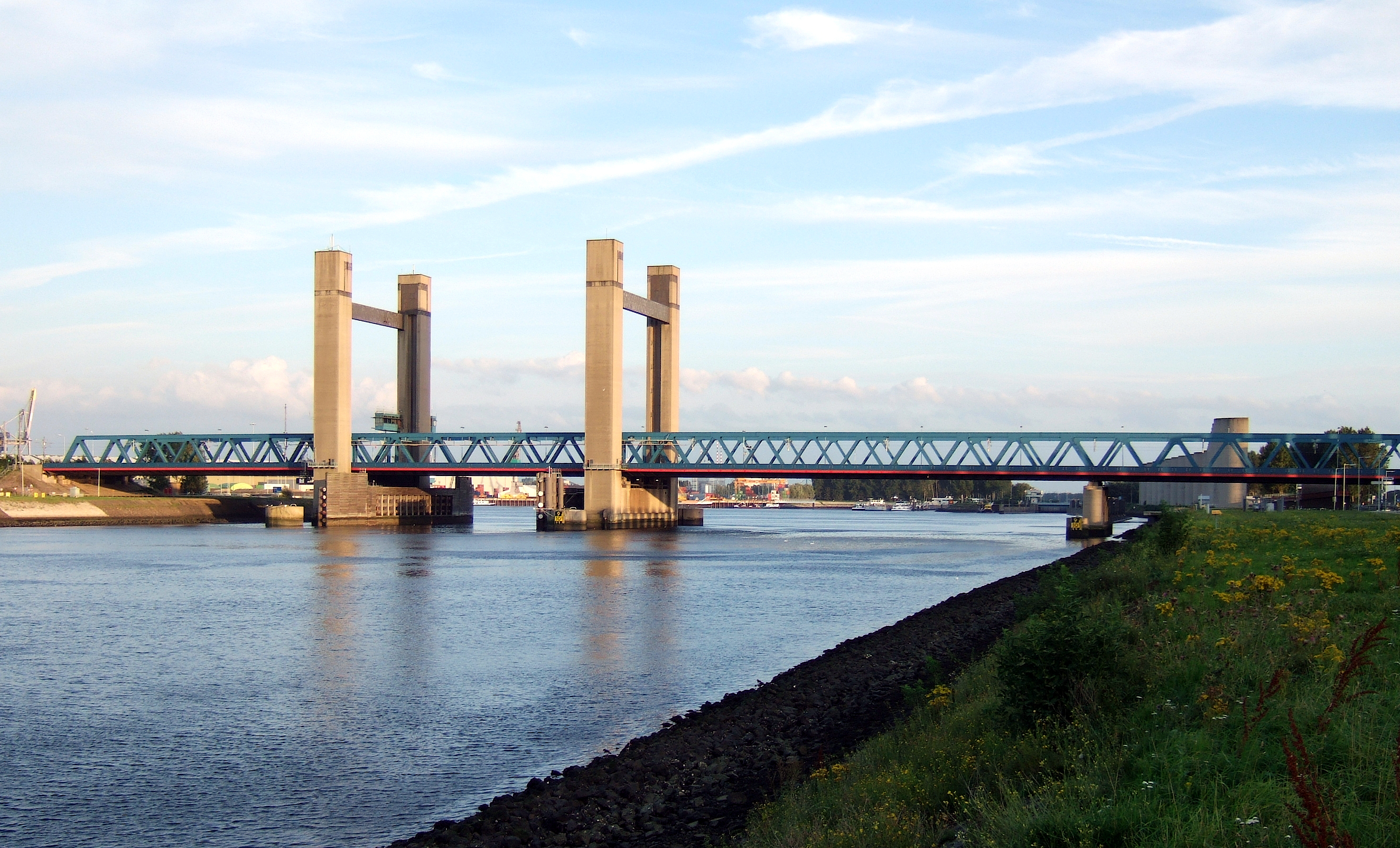
- Coordinates: 51°54′05″N 4°13′37″E
- Carries: Rijksweg 15; Havenspoorlijn Rotterdam
- Crosses: Caland Canal
- Locale: Rotterdam
- Maintained by: Rijkswaterstaat; ProRail

Characteristics
- Design: Truss bridge with vertical lift
- Total length: 344 m
- Width: 37 m
- Longest span: 107 m
- Clearance below: 49.7 m (open); 11.7 m closed

History
- Opened: June 6, 1969

Location
- Interactive map of Calandbrug

The Calandbrug is a road and former railroad bridge over the Caland Canal in the port of Rotterdam in the Dutch municipality of Rotterdam. It is located west of Rozenburg at the end of the canal, which flows into the Brittanniëhaven here. Completed in 1969, the truss bridge with integrated vertical lift bridge connects the Europoort and Botlek port areas and carries two lanes of Rijksweg 15, a separate path for mopeds and bicycles and a footpath. Until 2021, it also carried two tracks of the Havenspoorlijn Rotterdam.

As the Brittanniëhaven has to be reached by car transporters with high superstructures, which could no longer pass through the 46-metre-wide opening of the bridge in strong winds, the port authority had a 1.8-kilometre-long and 25-metre-high partially permeable wind barrier built on the west side of the bridge in 1985. In addition, the Thomassentunnel, which runs parallel to the bridge and has six lanes of the A15 motorway running under the Caland Canal, was built by 2004 to relieve the bridge. Since the opening of the Theemsweg route at the end of 2021, train traffic has been routed past the bridge via an elevated railroad, which means that rail freight traffic on the port railroad no longer has to be interrupted by shipping traffic. The bridge will continue to serve as a road bridge for local traffic and the transportation of hazardous goods.

== History ==
=== Europoort and Caland Canal in the 1960s ===
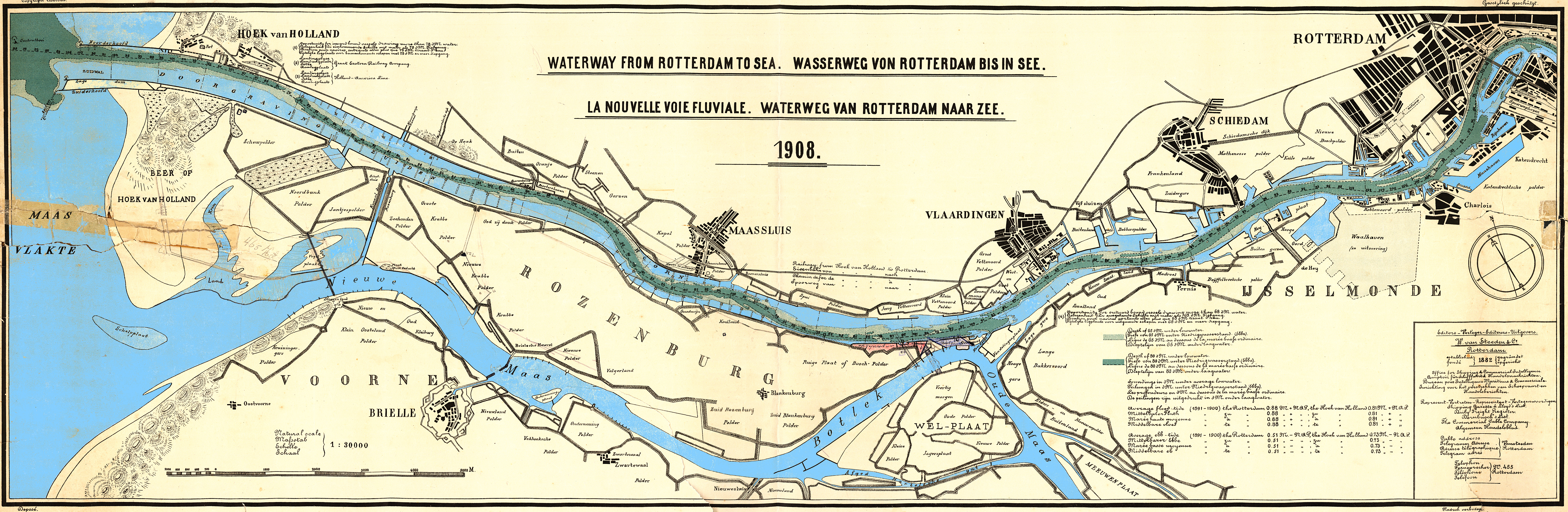
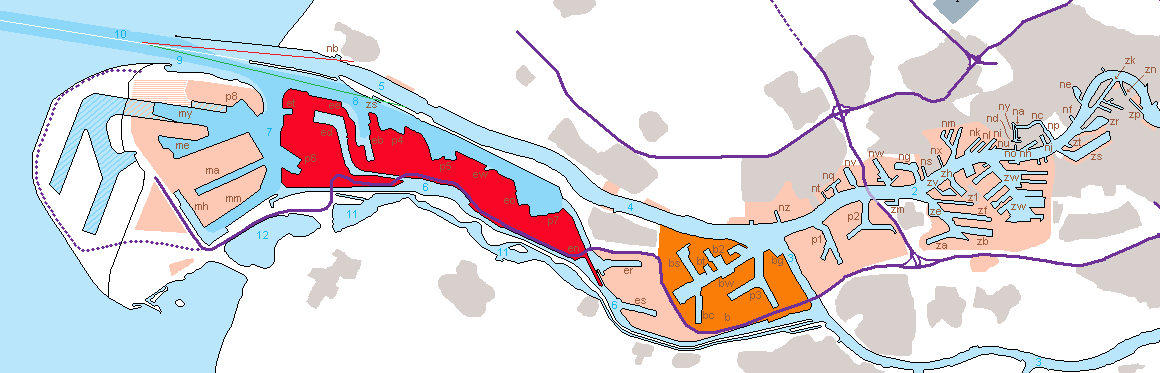
Western expansion of the port of Rotterdam south of the Nieuwe Waterweg from 1908 (top) to 2009 (bottom: Botlek until 1957, Europoort, area in between belongs to Botlek but was built later; Maasgeul top left)

Pieter Caland, who gave his name to the bridge and the canal it crosses, laid the foundation for the development of the port of Rotterdam into one of the largest seaports in the world with the design and construction of the Nieuwe Waterweg at the end of the 19th century. Before World War II, the port had mainly expanded to the west and south of the Nieuwe Waterweg to the Oude Maas, where the 1st and 2nd Petroleumhaven were built west of Pernis from the end of the 1930s, leading to the establishment of a large petrochemical industry. After the war, the westward expansion continued with the construction of the Botlek (1952-1957) and Europoort (1958-1964) port areas on the island of Rozenburg. The port facilities were adapted to developments in the energy and chemical sector, as the importance of coal as a fuel and raw material was increasingly replaced by crude oil and the locations of the oil refineries shifted from the production sites to the consumer countries. The 3rd petroleum port was built in Botlek and the 4th to 7th in Europoort, as well as tank farms and refineries for almost all the major oil companies. To enable the large oil tankers to access the Europoort deep-water port, the Euro-Maasgeul was built by the early 1970s and the Caland Canal was built as an extension parallel to the Nieuwe Waterweg, allowing ships with a draught of up to 21 meters to reach the port regardless of the tide. At that time, the Nieuwe Waterweg only had a depth of around 12 meters, which was increased to 15 meters by 2019. At the same time, the Hartel Canal was built for inland shipping on the south side along the former Brielse Maas (now Brielse Meer), which better separated it from maritime shipping.

=== Calandbrug (1969) and wind barrier (1985) ===
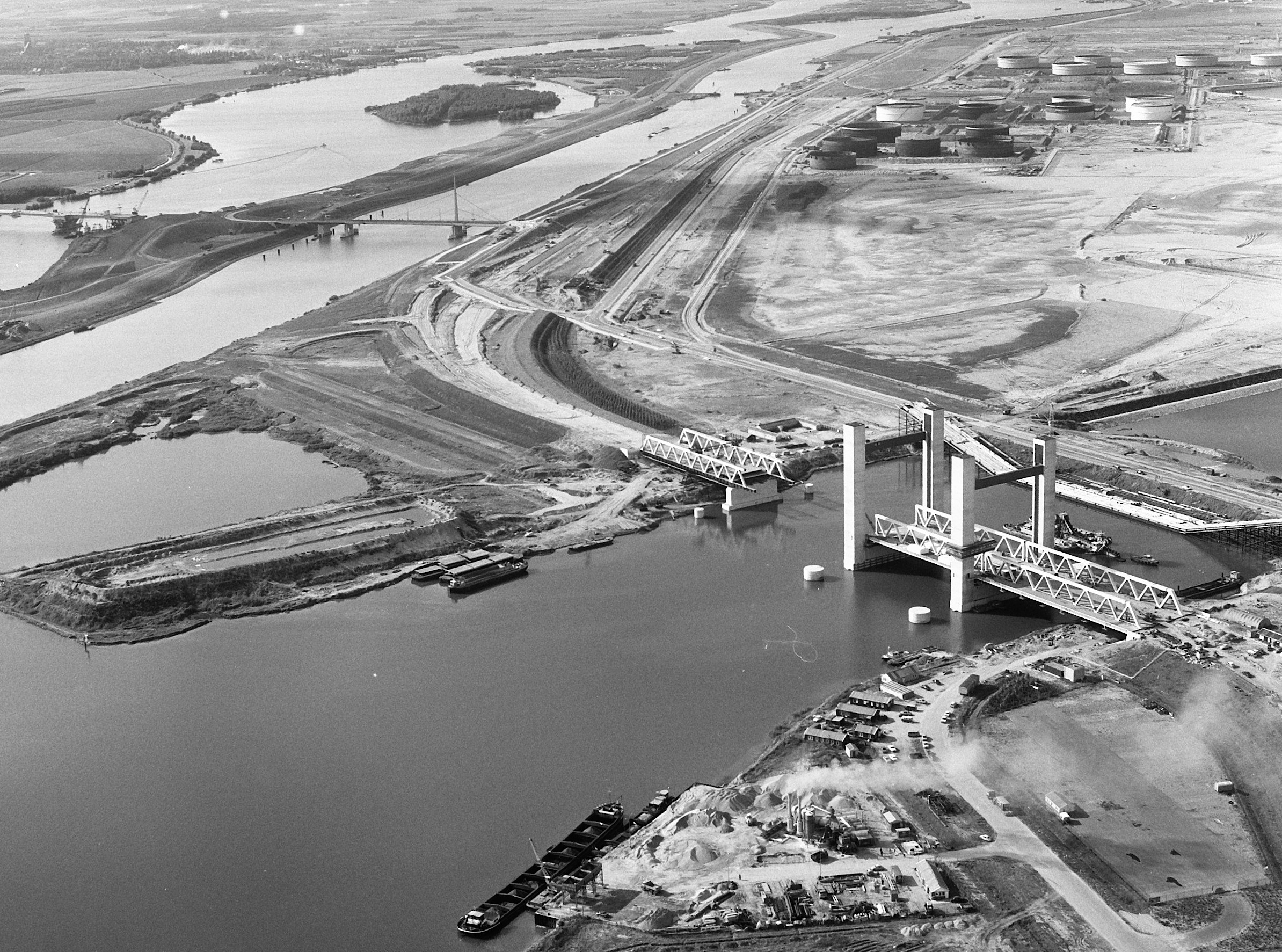
Construction of the Calandbrug over the still closed Caland Canal in 1968, top left the Hartel Canal with the Harmsenbrug and the Brielse Meer

The deep water area of the Caland Canal only extends as far as the end of the 7th Petroleumhaven. West of the municipality of Rozenburg, the canal then turns south to the shallower Brittanniëhaven. In the 1960s, a land connection between the port areas of Botlek and Europoort still separated this section from the canal, which was used for road and rail traffic and, from 1966, for the construction of the Calandbrug. The truss bridge with vertical lift bridge ultimately carried two lanes of the N15 and two tracks of the Havenspoorlijn Rotterdam. With the opening of the bridge on June 6, 1969 and the removal of the land connection, the Brittanniëhaven was connected; the connection to the Hartel Canal was established in 1971 with the commissioning of the Rozenburg lock, which marks the southern end of the Caland Canal.

The Brittanniëhaven was originally also designed for the petrochemical industry, but in the early 1980s the first car terminals with berths for car carriers and other RoRo ships were built on the north side. Due to their high superstructures, these types of ships had considerable problems passing through the 46-metre-wide opening of the lift bridge in strong winds. To protect the bridge, passage had to be prohibited at wind speeds of 30 km/h and above, which severely restricted access to the port section, especially in the winter months. In search of a solution, the port authority decided to build a 1.8-kilometre-long partially permeable wind barrier on the west side of the canal. The Windscherm Calandkanaal is made up of a large number of reinforced concrete elements up to 25 meters high and was designed in 1983 by Joop Schilperoord in collaboration with the architect Maarten Struijs and the sculptor Frans de Wit. It is still unique in its dimensions today and halved the prevailing wind speeds here from 1986, enabling the safe passage of the lift bridge up to a wind force of around 6 Bft.

=== Thomassentunnel (2004) and Theemsweg route (2021) ===
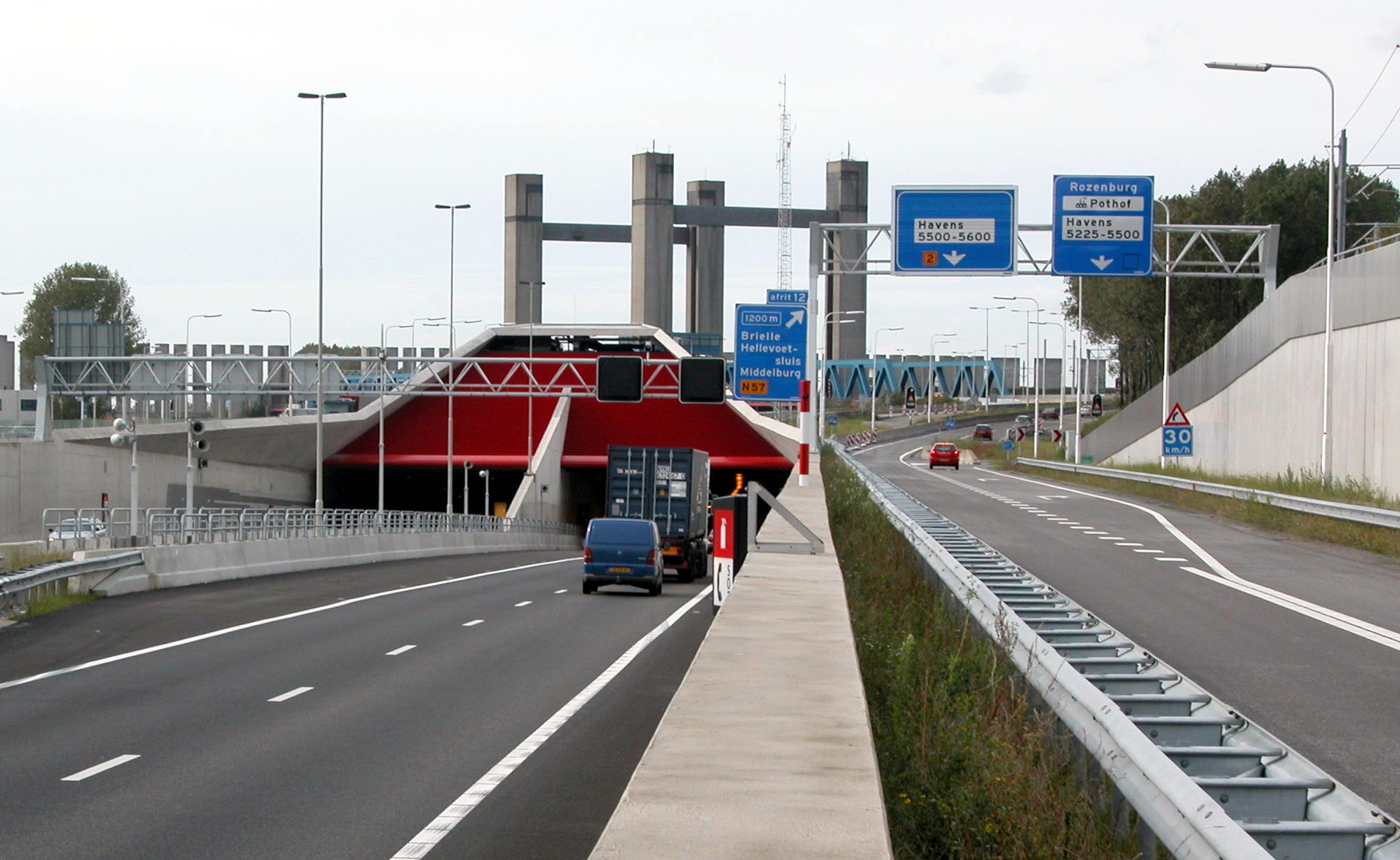
East portal of the Thomassentunnel (Rijkswaterstaat 2004)

The expansion of the port continued as early as the mid-1960s. The Maasvlakte (1964-1974) and later its extension Maasvlakte 2 (2008-2012) were built at the mouth of the Nieuwe Waterweg into the North Sea. This steadily increased the volume of traffic via the Calandbrug, which in 1998 had grown to an average of 45,000 vehicles per day. The increase in shipping traffic also resulted in around 12 bridge openings a day, which regularly caused traffic jams. To relieve the situation, an immersed tunnel was built from 1999 onwards around 100 meters south of the bridge under the Caland Canal, which is 14 meters deep here. The 1460-metre-long Thomassentunnel has carried six lanes of the A15 motorway since 2004, and the bridge has since been used as a parallel road bridge (N15) for local traffic and the transport of hazardous goods.

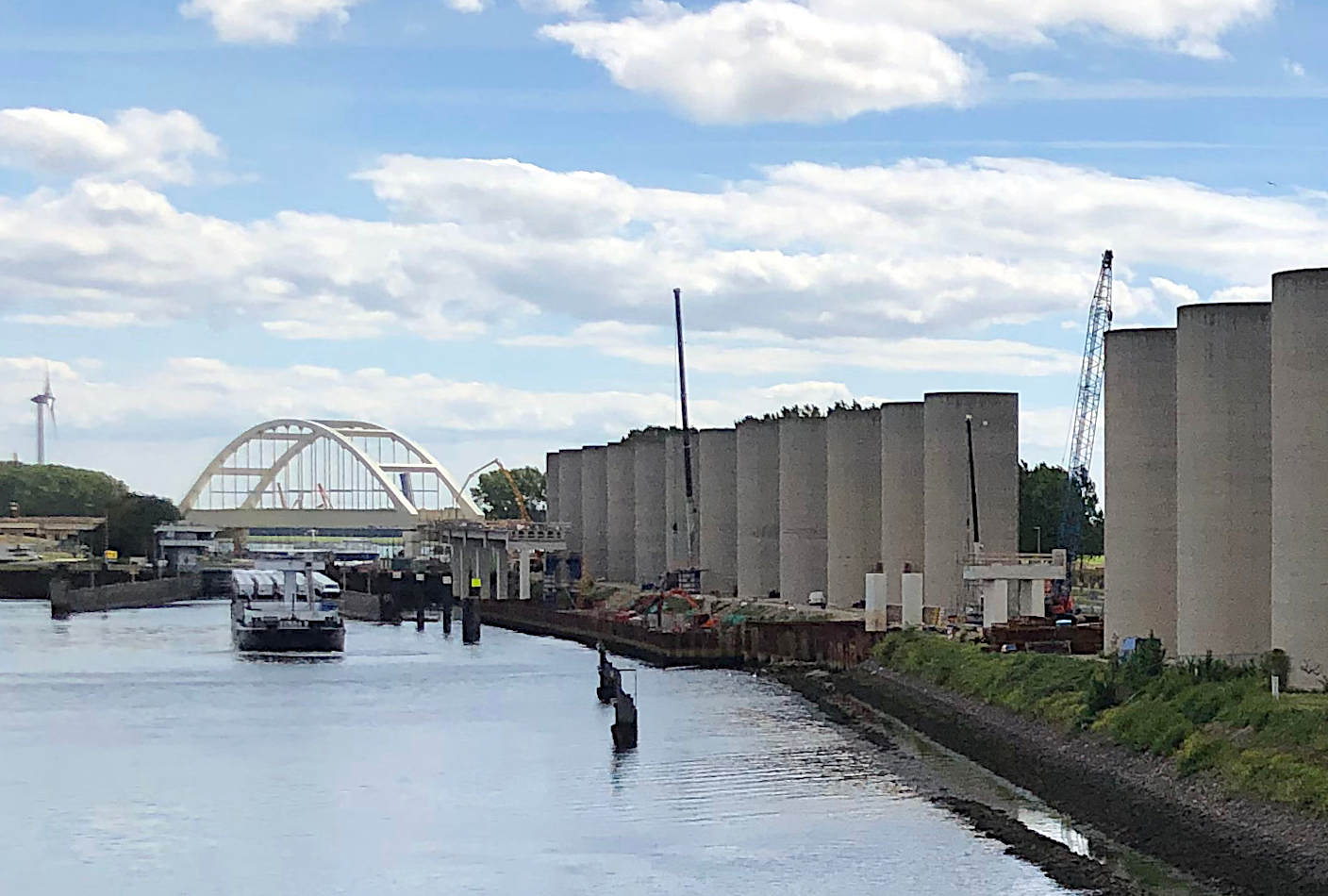
Construction of the Theemsweg route in front of the wind deflector, at the end of the Caland Canal the railroad arch bridge over the Rozenburg lock (2020)

The volume of traffic on the double-track port railroad has also increased steadily. Since 2007, it has been part of the Betuweroute to Zevenaar, which was built to relieve the A15 from the enormous increase in truck traffic in the seaport hinterland. In 2010, up to 58 trains crossed the bridge every day, which were also affected by the interruptions caused by shipping traffic. From 2017, the operator ProRail therefore built a new 4-kilometer route to bypass the Calandbrug, which runs south of the Brittanniëhaven along the eponymous Theemsweg. As the Rozenburg lock and the Thomassentunnel had to be crossed, it was designed as a double-track elevated railway with a tied-arch bridge over both the lock and the tunnel. The first freight train ran over the Theemsweg route (Theemswegtracé) on November 8, 2021, and train traffic over the bridge was discontinued. ProRail, in collaboration with Rijkswaterstaat, wants to draw up a renovation plan for the Calandbrug by 2024, the maintenance of which will eventually be taken over by the Dutch authority.

The first major repairs to the bridge were carried out in 2006 in order to strengthen it for the expected increase in train traffic. To this end, additional steel plates were attached to the joints between the lower chords of the trusses and the diagonal struts and the struts themselves were reinforced. At the same time, the dead weight of the orthotropic deck slab in the area of the tracks was also increased to minimize driving noise. In May 2022, the bridge had to be closed until the end of 2022 due to massive bearing damage to the deflection pulleys of the lift bridge's cable pull system. The work took several months, as the deflection pulleys are located at a height of 60 meters in the four towers of the lift bridge and a temporary support structure had to be built to fix the movable structure in the open position.

== Description ==
=== Bridge ===
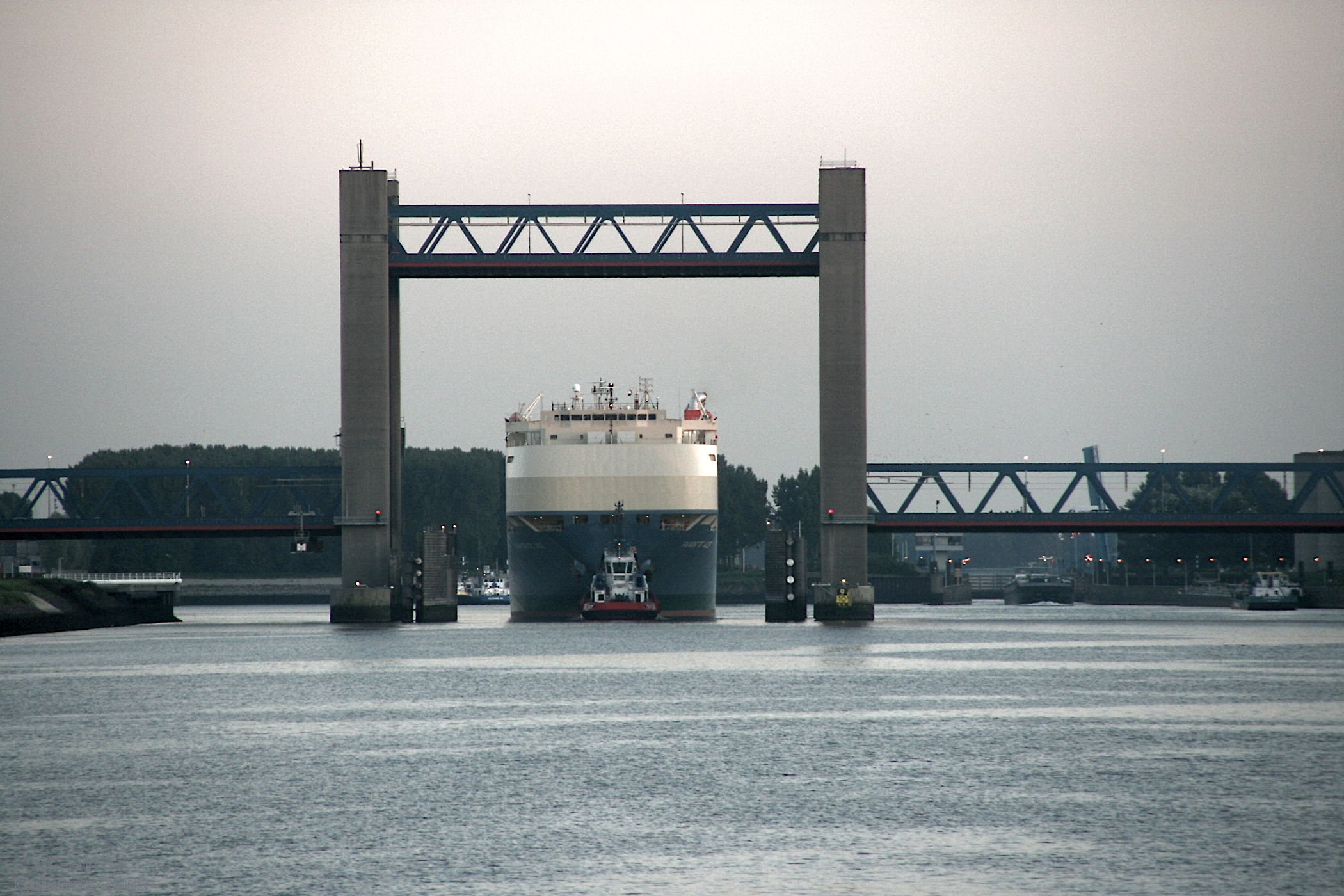
A car transporter passes the lift bridge (2008)

The Calandbrug extends perpendicular to the Caland Canal over 343.6 m between the abutments. From east to west, the truss bridge is divided into a single-span girder with a span of 84.8 m, another movable girder with a span of 67.8 m and a continuous girder 186.5 m long, which runs across two bridge spans and forms spans of 107.4 m and 79.1 m. The distance between the supports on the current piers of the lift bridge is 2.3 m. The structures, which are asymmetrical in cross-section and identical in construction, consist of two 8.5 m high parallel chord strut trusses and an orthotropic deck below. The trusses have a spacing of 23.2 m in relation to their central axes, with a width of 1.0 m on the south side and 1.2 m on the north side carrying the tracks. The roadway slab is 37.4 m wide in total and projects 7.5 m beyond the trusses on the east side and 5.7 m on the north side. The traffic routes are divided from east to west in cross-section: a footpath, an area for mopeds and bicycles, the four lanes of the N15 between the trusses and the area for the two tracks on both sides of the northern truss.

The movable supporting structure of the lift bridge weighs around 1200 tons. It is connected to four counterweights via a total of 36 steel cables with a diameter of 62 mm, which run over deflection pulleys with a diameter of 4 meters in the upper section of the 64.7 m high towers. In accordance with the higher mass of the supporting structure on the track side, 10 ropes per tower were used here and 8 on the track side; the counterweights also have different masses of 340 and 280 tons respectively. The rope hoist system is driven by four DC motors, two of which are connected via a shaft that runs in the upper crossbeam between the towers. The motors have a total output of 1000 HP and can raise the lift bridge by 38 m in 60 seconds. The clear height is 11.7 m in the closed position and a maximum of 49.7 m in the open position. The available clearance width for maritime shipping is 46.0 m below the lift bridge, and for inland shipping there is also an 80.0 m wide opening under the adjacent through girder.

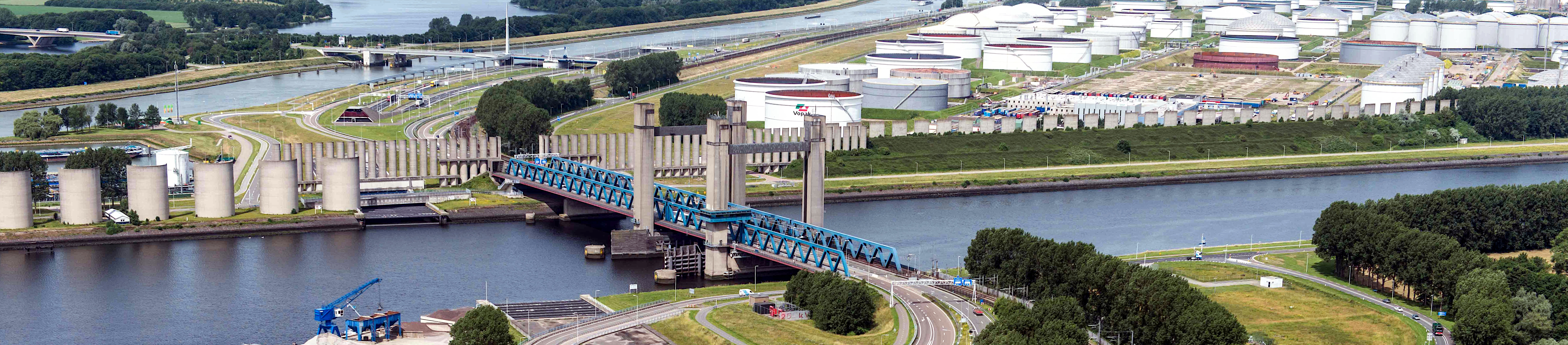
View to the west of the Calandbrug and the wind deflector, with the Harmsenbrug across the Hartel Canal in the background (Rijkswaterstaat 2012).

=== Wind barrier ===
At the time of its completion in 1986, the 1750 m long wind barrier on the west bank of the Caland Canal (Windscherm Calandkanaal) consisted of three parts due to the terrain. Starting at the southern end in front of the northern head of the Rozenburg lock, 22 free-standing semi-circular reinforced concrete shells were erected, each 12 m apart, with a height of 25 m and an outer diameter of 18 m. At the height of the bridge, two separate connected structures were chosen due to the necessary openings for road traffic and the roads running parallel to the canal, which were erected about 70 m behind the line of the southern row of shells and overlapping with it. The reinforced concrete structures in the middle section therefore consist of 22 or 36 narrower shells with an outer diameter of 4 m, each arranged at a distance of 1.3 m and connected to each other by particularly torsion-resistant solid beams; the total height here is also 25 m. The northern part consists of a 15 m high earth embankment on which 49 10 m long and high reinforced concrete slabs were erected. These also overlap with the central section and are set back a further 15 m.

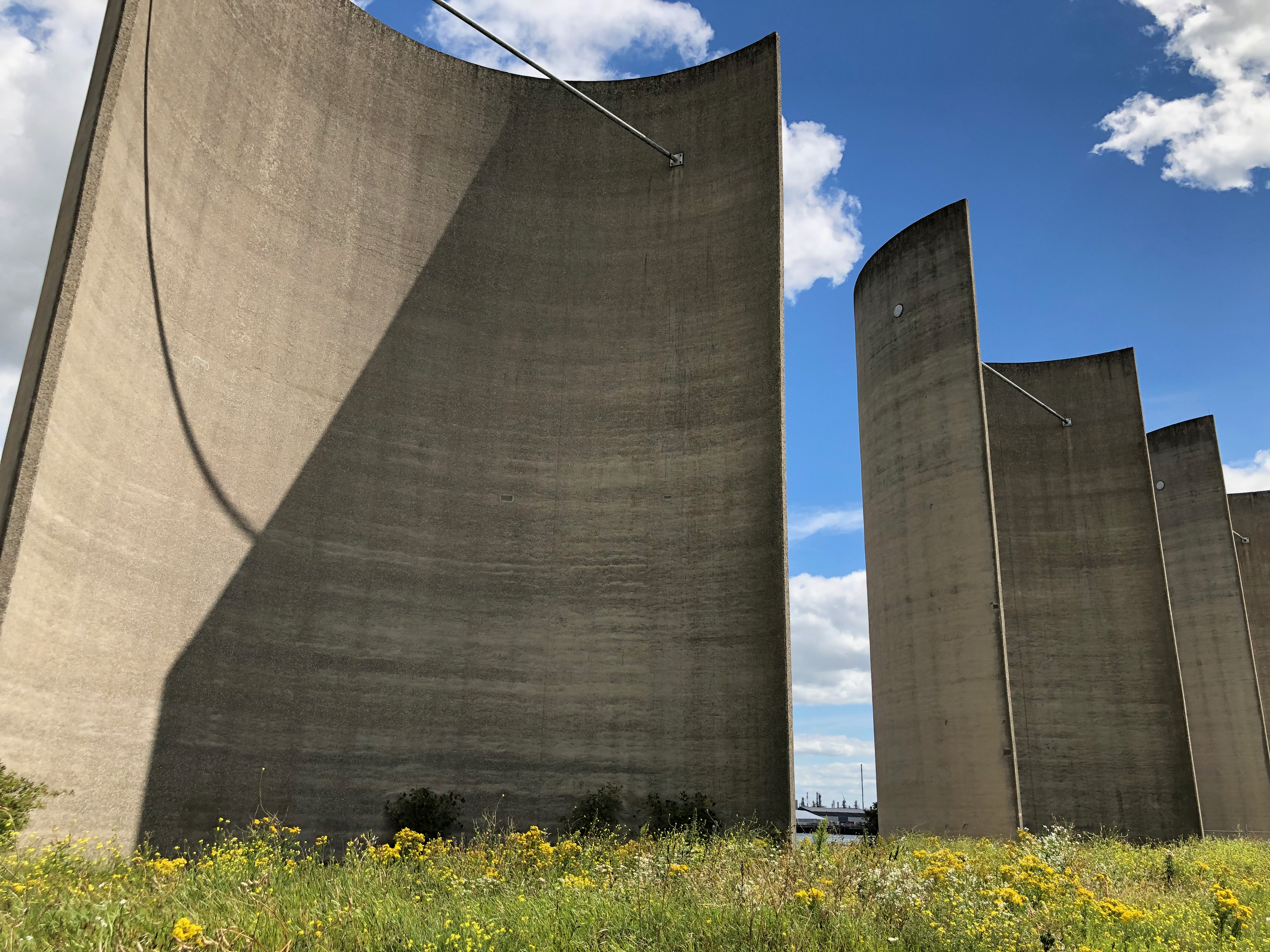
The large semi-circular concrete shells of the southern section

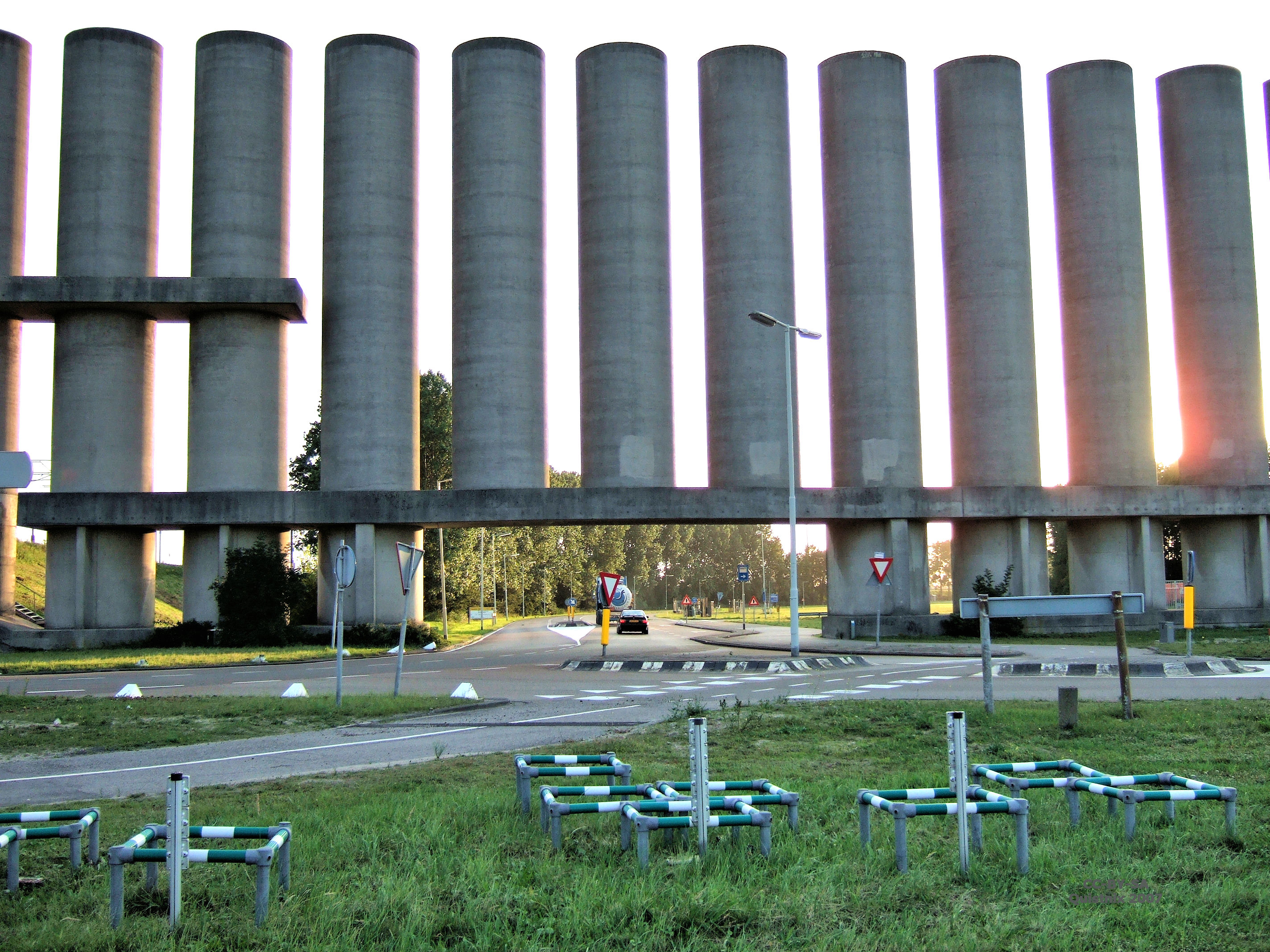
Central section with the connecting reinforced concrete beams

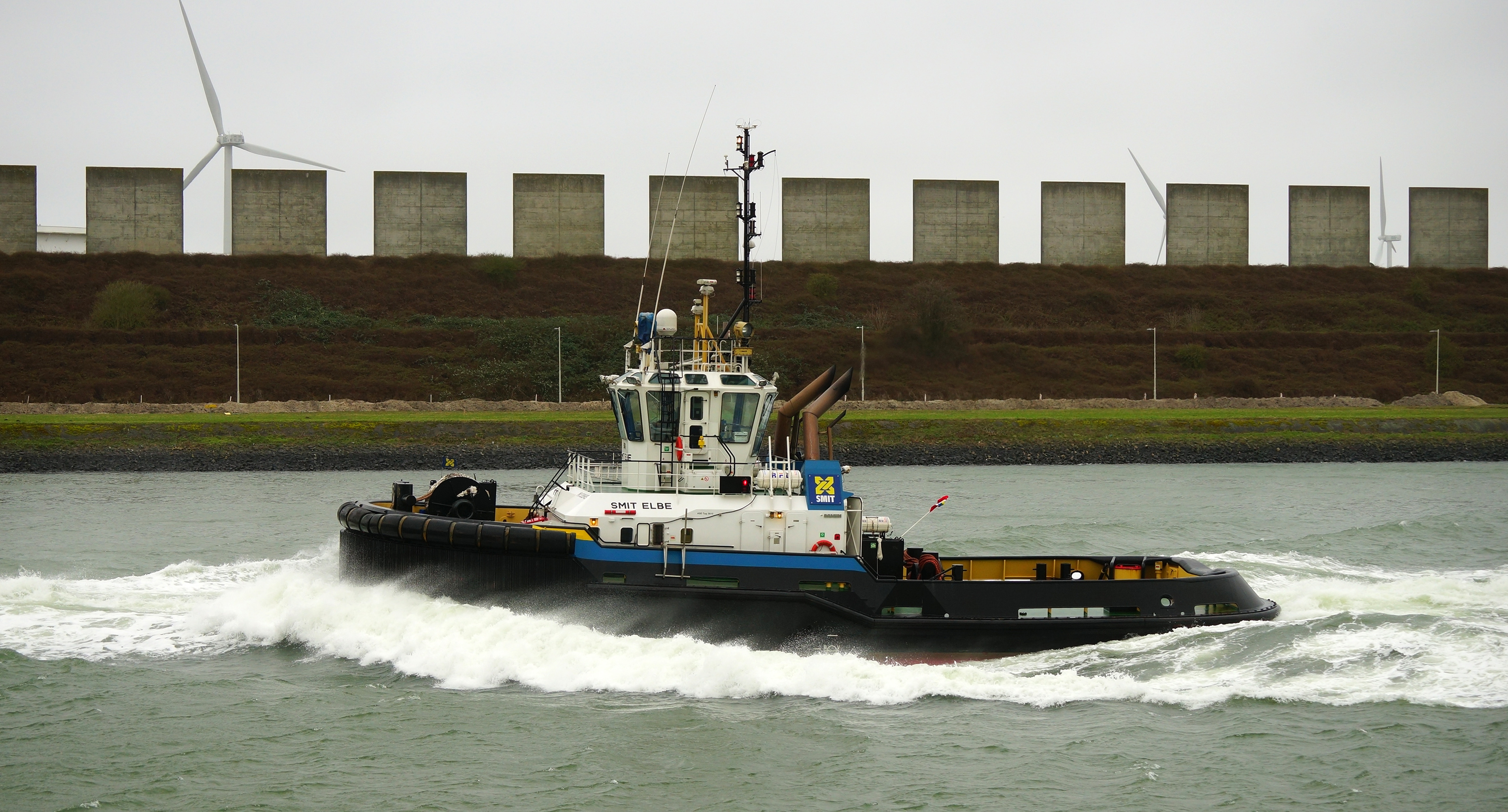
The concrete slabs of the northern section on the earth embankment

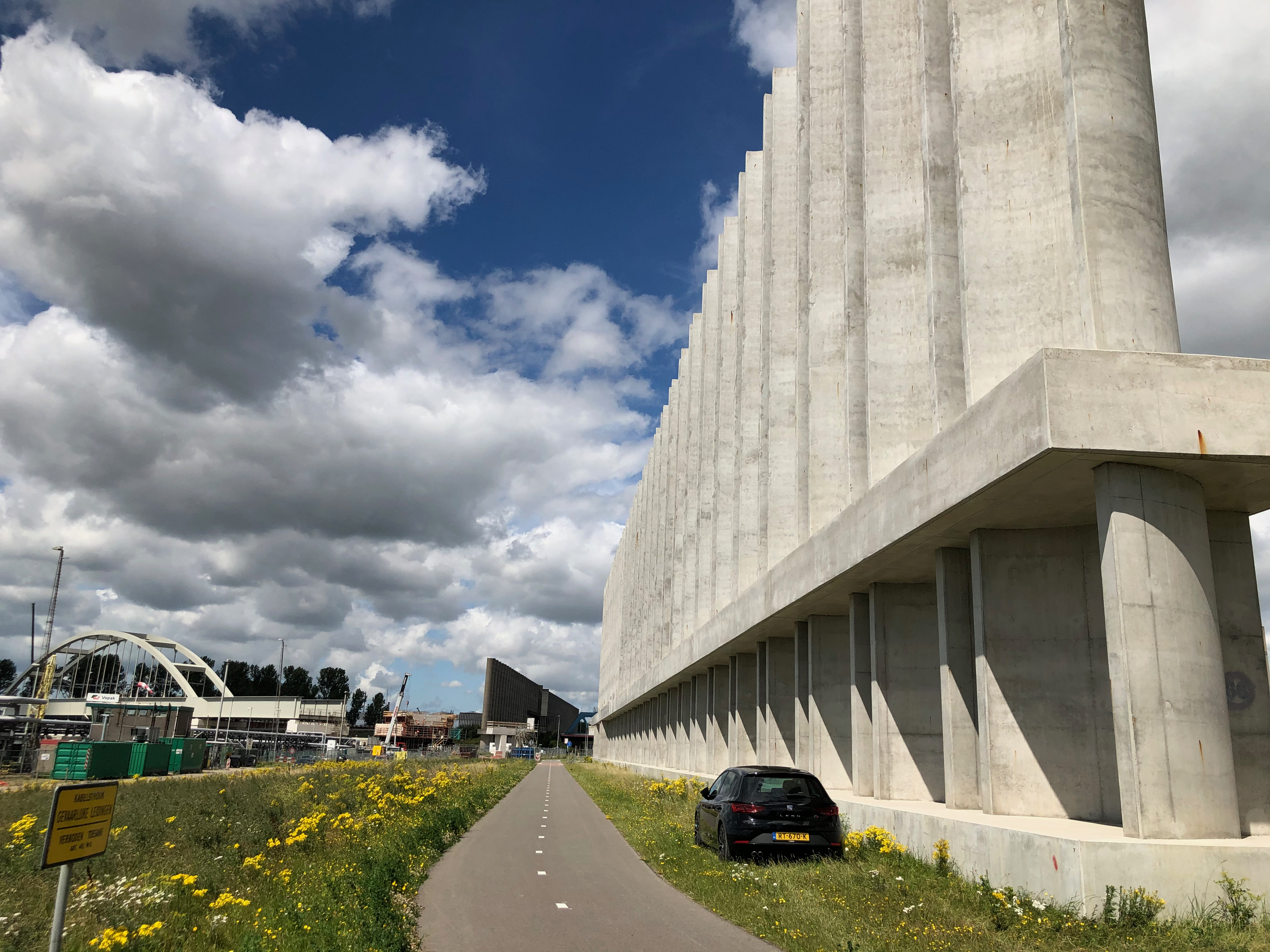
The fourth section built as part of the Theemsweg route

Calculations and model tests showed a maximum reduction in wind speeds with 25% permeability of the overall structure and an orientation of the concrete shells with their inwardly curved surfaces to the west. From 1986, the prevailing wind speeds in the canal in the vicinity of the bridge were halved. Due to the construction of the Thomassentunnel and the Theemsweg route, some of the large concrete shells on the south side of the bridge had to be relocated or removed. To compensate for this, a fourth section consisting of 27 narrow shells similar to the middle section was built.

== Bibliography ==
- August Jules van Neste: Dix ans de ponts métalliques à Rotterdam. In: Acier-Stahl-Steel. Volume 35, 1970, Part 1, No. 7/8, p. 347–352 and Part 2, No. 9, p. 396–404, here p. 402–404 (in French).
- Jopp Schilperoord, Maarten Struijs: The wind barrier along the Caland Canal near Rotterdam. In: IABSE Symposium (Paris-Versailles): Concrete structures for the future. Volume 55, 1987, p. 615–620 (doi:10.5169/seals-42787).
- Bert Snijder, Bert H. Hesselink: Strengthening the Caland Bridge Rotterdam for Increased Load. In: IABSE Symposium Report. 92(2), January 2006.
- De Calandbrug. In: Bruggen. Volume 27, No. 3, 2017, p. 20–25 (in Dutch).
