= Nieuwe Waterweg =

Ship canal in the Netherlands

Coordinates: 51°56′31″N 4°11′29″E

Nieuwe Waterweg New Waterway
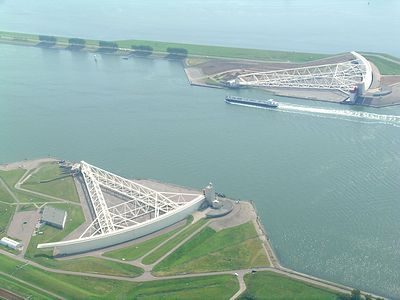

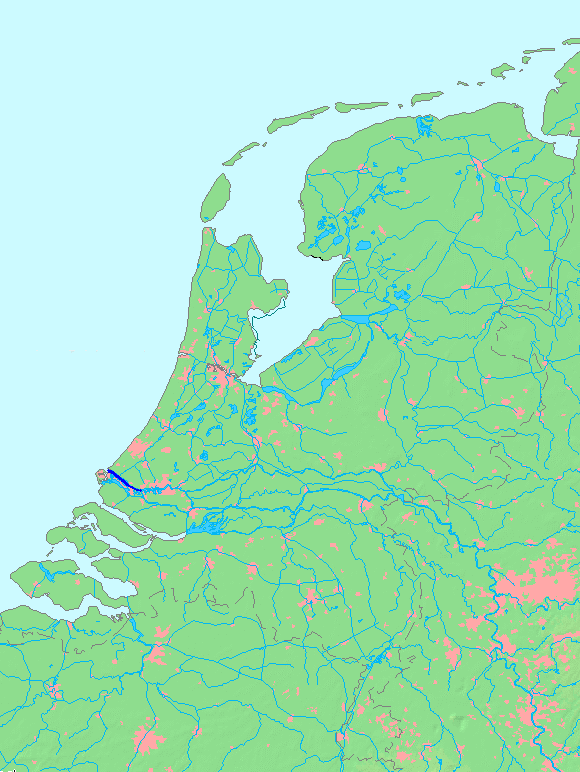
- Location of Nieuwe Waterweg (including Het Scheur) in dark blue.

Location
- Country: Netherlands
- Province: South Holland

Physical characteristics
- Source: Nieuwe Maas
  - location: Maassluis
- Mouth: Maasmond
  - location: Hook of Holland
- Length: 20 km (12 mi)

The Nieuwe Waterweg ("New Waterway") is a ship canal in the Netherlands from het Scheur (a branch of the Rhine-Meuse-Scheldt delta) west of the town of Maassluis to the North Sea at Hook of Holland: the Maasmond, where the Nieuwe Waterweg connects to the Maasgeul. It is the artificial mouth of the river Rhine.

The Nieuwe Waterweg, which opened in 1872 and has a length of approximately 20.5 kilometres (12.7 mi), was constructed to keep the city and port of Rotterdam accessible to seafaring vessels as the natural Meuse-Rhine branches silted up. The Waterway is a busy shipping route since it is the primary access to one of the busiest ports in the world, the Port of Rotterdam. At the entrance to the sea, a flood protection system called Maeslantkering has been installed (completed in 1997). There are no bridges or tunnels across the Nieuwe Waterweg.

== History ==
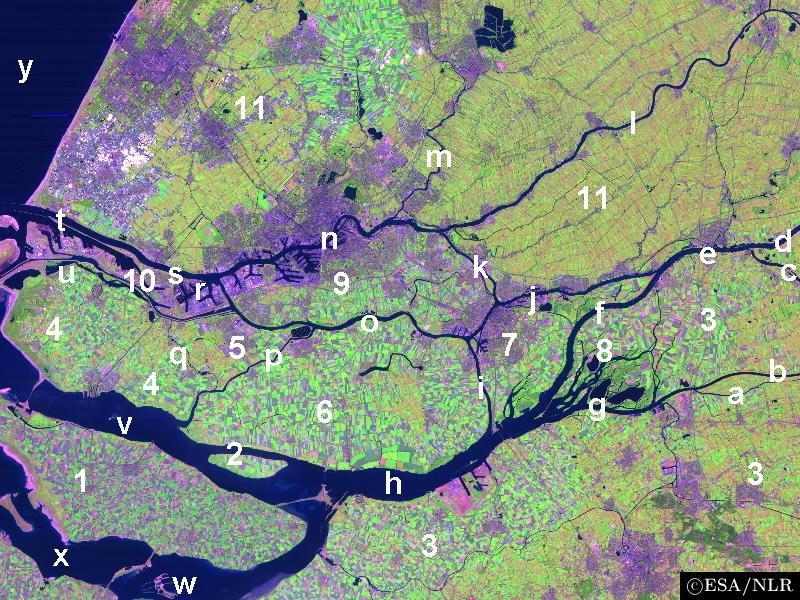
Satellite image of the northwest part of the Rhine-Meuse delta showing the Nieuwe Waterweg (t).

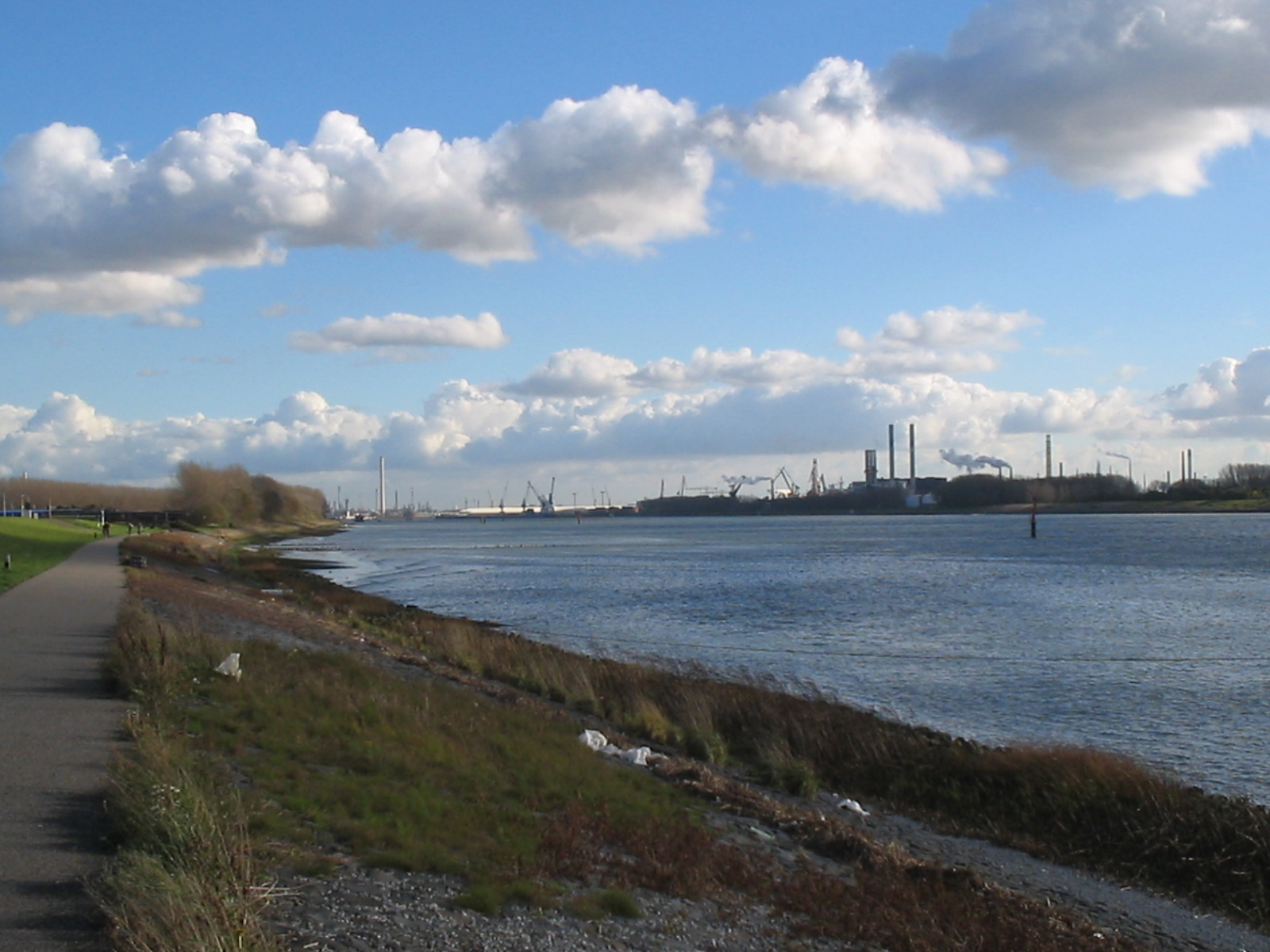
Nieuwe Waterweg

By the middle of the 19th century, Rotterdam was already one of the largest port cities in the world, mainly because of transshipment of goods from Germany to Great Britain. The increase in shipping traffic created a capacity problem: there were too many branches in the river delta, making the port difficult to reach.

In 1863, a law was passed that allowed for the provision of a new canal for large ocean-going ships from Rotterdam to the North Sea. Hydraulic engineer Pieter Caland was commissioned to design a canal cutting through the "Hook of Holland” and to extend the mouth of the Rhine to the sea. The designs for this were already done back in 1731 by Nicolaas Samuelsz Cruquius but the implementation could no longer be postponed to prevent the decline of the harbour of Rotterdam.

Construction began on 31 October 1863. The first phase consisted of the expropriation of farm lands from Rozenburg to Hook of Holland.

During the second phase two dikes were built parallel to each other, which took 2 years. Caland proposed to extend the dikes 2 km into the sea to disrupt the coastal sea currents and decrease silt deposits in the shipping lane.

Upon the completion of the dikes, the third phase began by the digging of the actual waterway. This began on 31 October 1866 and was completed three years later. The large amounts of removed soil were in turn used to reinforce other dams and dikes.

The last phase consisted of the removal of the dam separating the new waterway from the sea and river. In 1872, the Nieuwe Waterweg was completed and Rotterdam was easily accessible.

Because of the currents and erosion, the shipping lane has been widened somewhat. Yet because of the draft of today's supertankers, it needs to be dredged constantly.

In 1997, the last part of the Delta Works, the Maeslantkering, was put in operation near the mouth of the Nieuwe Waterweg. This storm surge barrier protects Rotterdam against north westerly Beaufort Force 10 to 12 storms.

== Current situation ==
The Nieuwe Waterweg gives the Port of Rotterdam its deep-water access to the North Sea. From Hook of Holland it stretches for approximately 20.5 kilometres (12.7 mi) where the waterway continues as the Nieuwe Maas. The very first Nieuwe Waterweg—a breach through the dunes at Hook of Holland—was only 4.3 kilometres (2.7 mi) long, but in around 1877 the channel was made much larger and wider and the current Nieuwe Waterweg was created. Currently the width of the channel is between 480 and 675 metres (1,575 and 2,215 ft) and it is dredged to a depth of 14.5–16 metres (48–52 ft) below Amsterdam Ordnance Datum.

It is this channel, together with the dredged channels in the North Sea, Maasgeul and Eurogeul, that allows ships like the MS Berge Stahl and MV Vale Rio de Janeiro (both with a draught of 23 meters) to enter Europoort.

The Dutch government agency Rijkswaterstaat is responsible for maintaining the channel.

== Maasmond ==
The point where the Nieuwe Waterweg enters into the North Sea, between Hook of Holland on the north bank and the Maasvlakte to the south, is called the Maasmond. It is marked with two navigation light-towers called the Paddestoelen ("mushrooms"). The Nieuwe Waterweg connects, in the North Sea, to the Maasgeul. This dredged channel in the North Sea is being widened to 840 metres (2,760 ft) to facilitate the largest container vessels for the new Maasvlakte 2 that opened in 2013.
