= Maascenter =

Maascenter is an important navigation point for ships entering the Port of Rotterdam. In principle Maascenter is a buoy before the coast of Rotterdam, Netherlands.

Another important buoy in the neighborhood is the Maasgeul buoy as this is where the Eurogeul ends and the Maasgeul starts.

Maascenter buoy is also the pilot station where ships entering the port get their pilot on board (except for ships with a draft > 14 meters as they get their pilot on board before entering the Eurogeul. For these ships Maascemter is also important as they will meet their tugboats at this point.).

Ships with destination Rotterdam (that require a pilot) need to contact the traffic-centre 24 hours before expected arrival (ETA) at Maascenter
