= Europoort =

Area of the Port of Rotterdam

Coordinates: 51°56′36″N 4°08′33″E

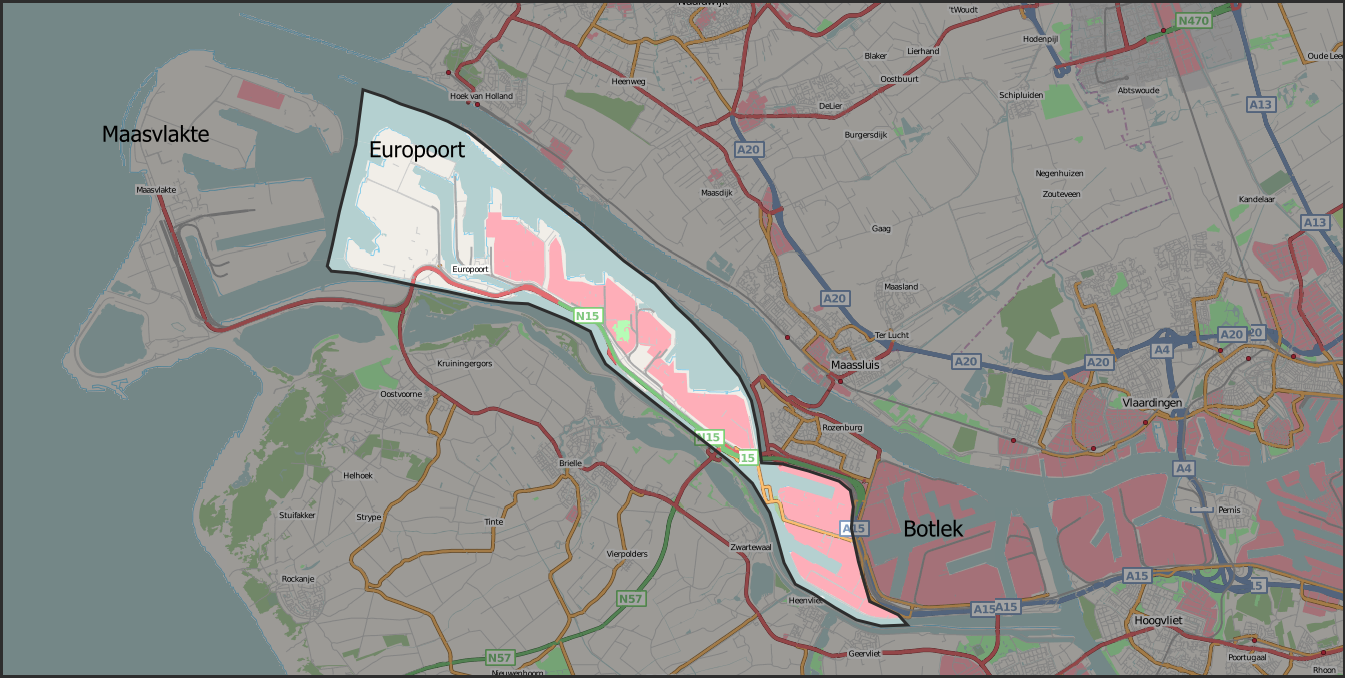
Location of Europoort

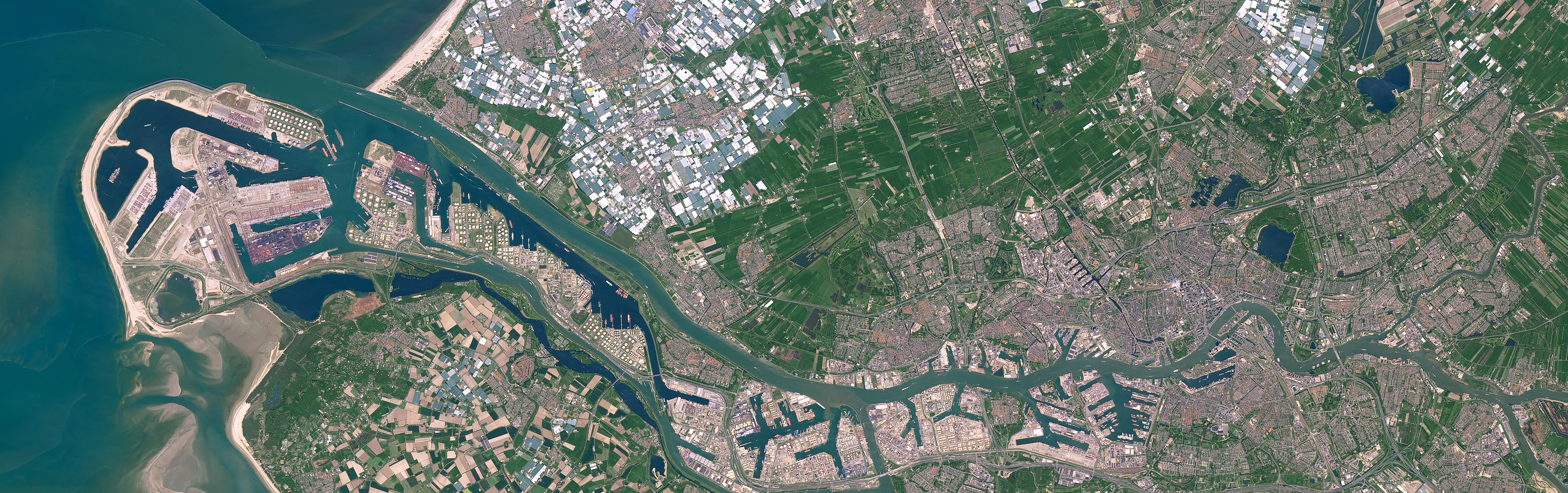
Satellite photo of the Port of Rotterdam

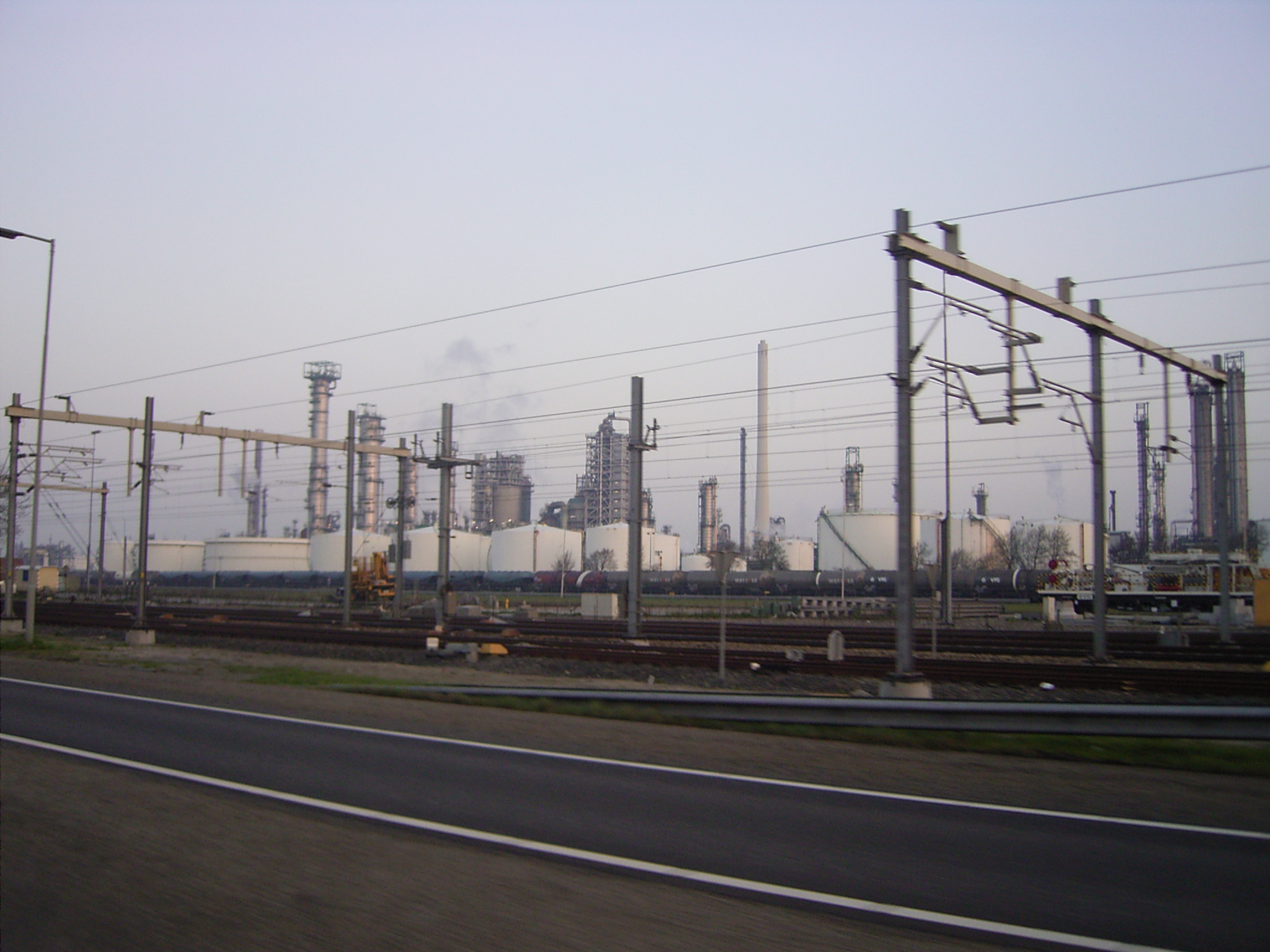
Refineries in the vicinity of Europoort

Europoort (Dutch pronunciation: [ˈøːroːpoːrt], English: Eurogate, also "Europort") is an area of the Port of Rotterdam and the adjoining industrial area in the Netherlands. It is on the south side of the mouth of the rivers Rhine and Meuse, and its hinterland consists of the Netherlands, Germany, Belgium and part of France. Europoort is one of the world's busiest ports and is considered a major gateway to Europe. The port handled 12 million containers in 2015.

The Europoort area is very heavily industrialised with petrochemical refineries and storage tanks, bulk iron ore and coal handling as well as container and new motor vehicle terminals.

Europoort is situated on the south bank of the Nieuwe Waterweg, the same as the Maasvlakte area. On the northern bank of the Nieuwe Waterweg is Hook of Holland (in Dutch: Hoek van Holland).

== Development of Europoort ==
Rotterdam has developed from a small town into a major harbour city. In earlier centuries, docks were built on the banks of the Nieuwe Maas river. In the 19th century, connections between Rotterdam and the North Sea were poor, with a large estuary/delta area with many small waterways between them. Ships had to sail around Voorne-Putten to go out to sea. This could take several days or even weeks.

To improve the situation, the Nieuwe Waterweg ("New Waterway"), a large canal, was designed to connect the Rhine and Meuse rivers to the sea. The Nieuwe Waterweg, designed by Pieter Caland, was to be partly dug, then to further deepen the canal bed by the natural flow of the water. Ultimately however, the last part had to be dug also. Nevertheless, Rotterdam from now on had a direct connection between the sea and harbour areas with sufficient depth. The Nieuwe Waterweg has since been deepened several times.

Over the years the port was further developed seaward by building new docks and harbour-basins. In the 1970s the port was extended into the sea at the south side of the mouth of the Nieuwe Waterweg by completion of the Maasvlakte (Meuse-plain), a large land reclamation area with even more refineries and storage tanks. This project was called Europoort, literally the "Gate to Europe". The Maasvlakte 2 project is extending Europoort even further seaward, but the UK-Netherlands border is set equidistantly from the IJmuiden harbour coast line and remains unaffected by the expansion.

In the past five years the industrialized skyline has been changed by the addition of large numbers of wind turbines taking advantage of the exposed coastal conditions.

== Factors for Europoort's success ==
The most important factor contributing to the large amount of cargo shipping in and out of Europort is the presence of the Maas (Meuse) and Rhine rivers. Through these rivers, Europoort is connected to the Ruhr Area in Germany as well as Switzerland, Belgium and France. Furthermore, Europoort is connected to its rival, the port of Antwerp, by the Scheldt–Rhine Canal. Adding to its transit function, Rotterdam is connected to Germany by the A15 highway and by a railway network. In 2007, an extra railway connection (the Betuweroute) was completed to create an extra connection to the Ruhr area.

The P&O passenger/car/lorry overnight ferry service to Hull, England, operates from Europoort using two ferries: the Pride of Rotterdam and the Pride of Hull.
