= Maasvlakte =

Westward extension of the Europoort

Coordinates: 51°57′09″N 4°02′47″E

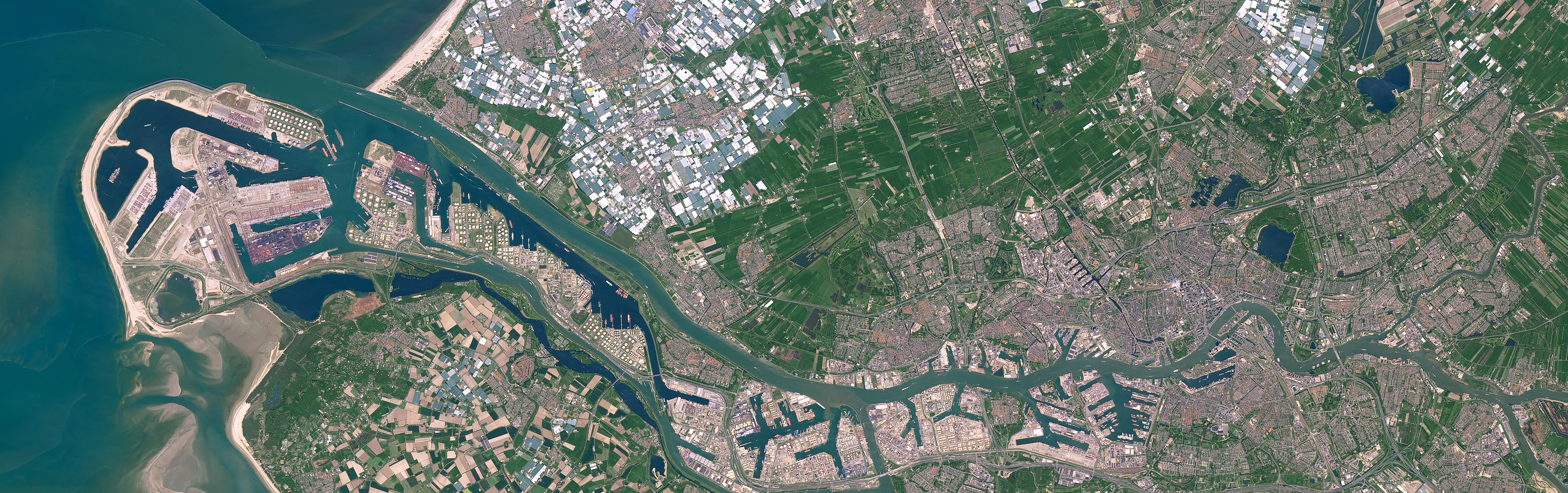
Satellite image of the Port of Rotterdam, with the Maasvlakte on the left

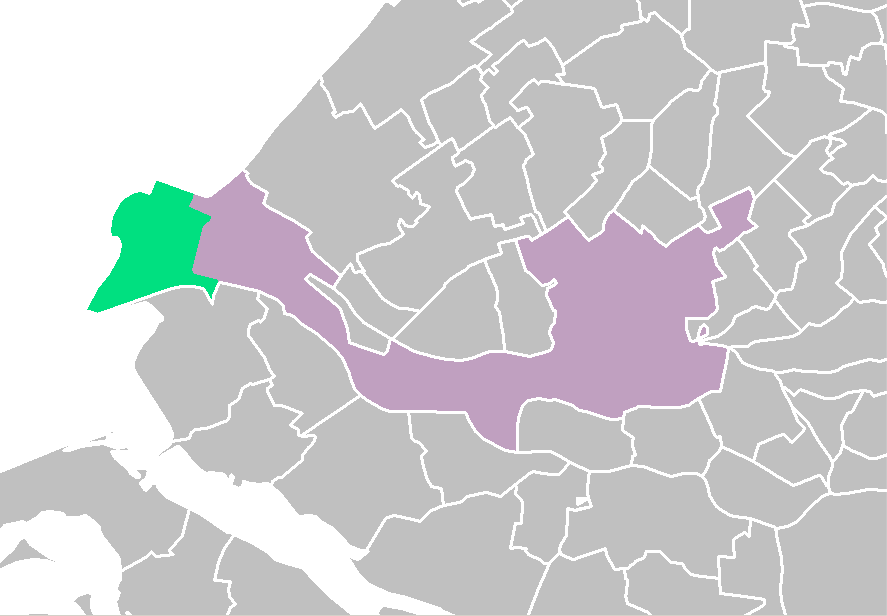
Location of the Maasvlakte (green) in the municipality of Rotterdam (purple)

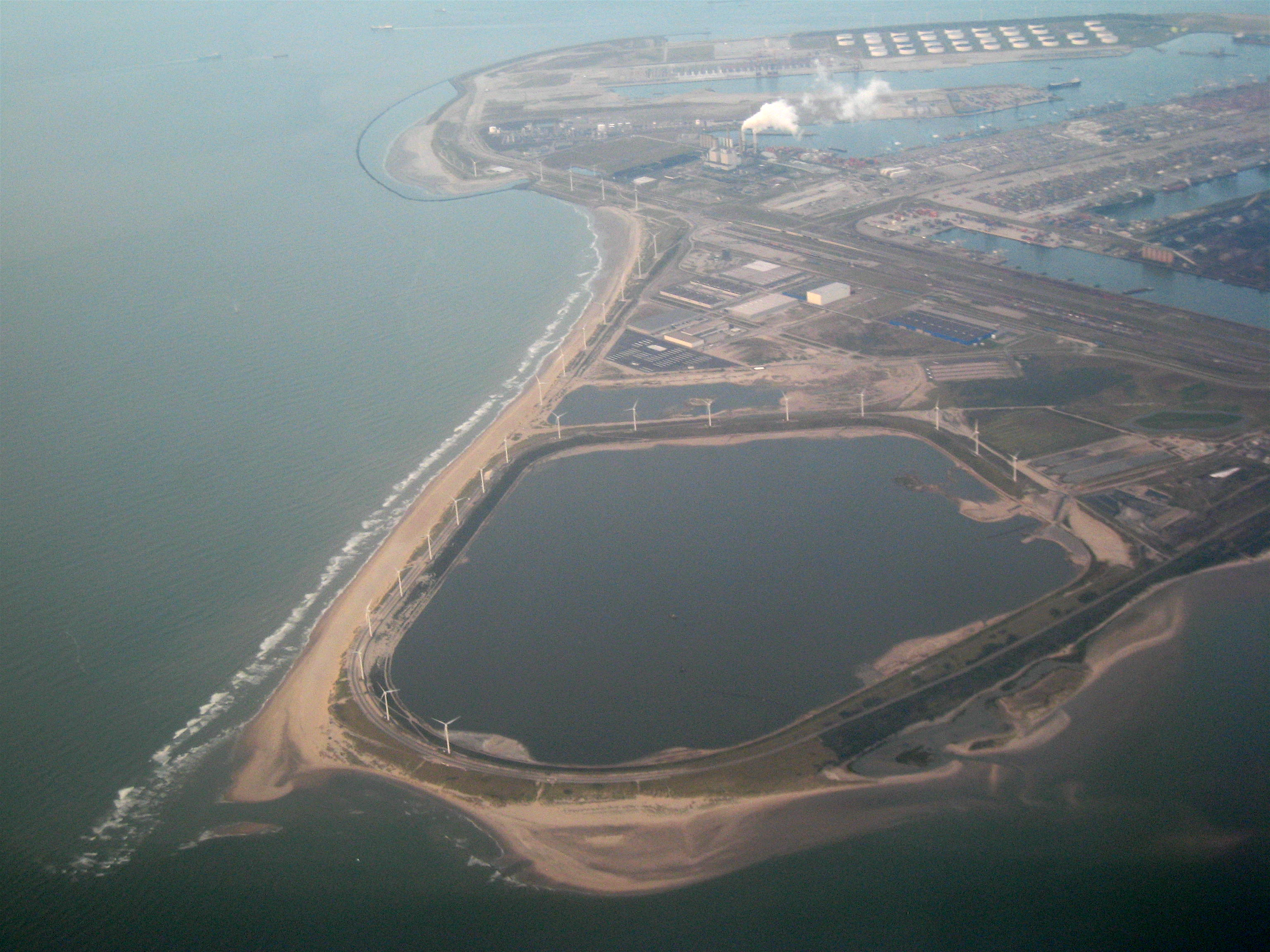
Aerial view of the Maasvlakte

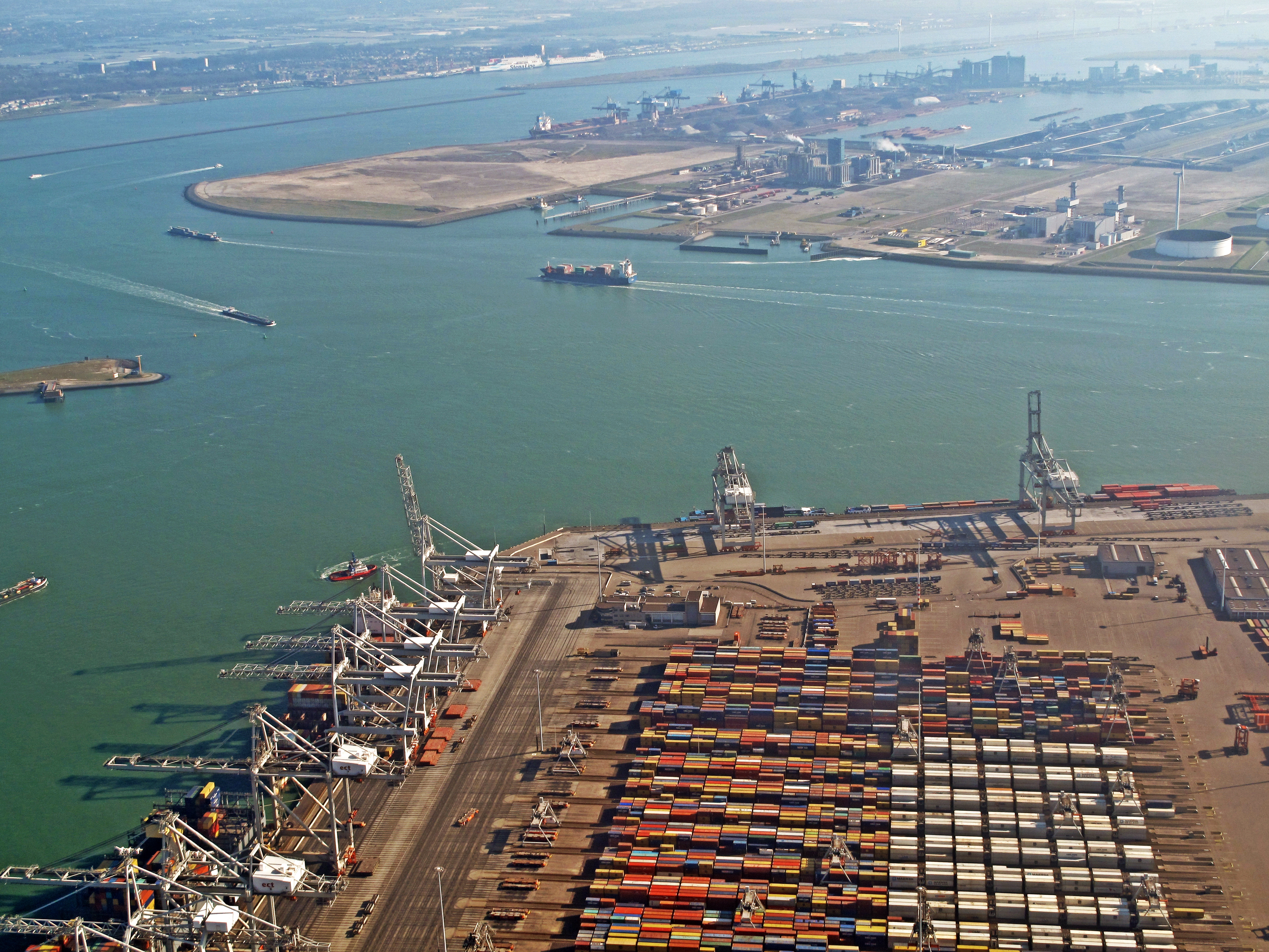
Container terminal on the Maasvlakte

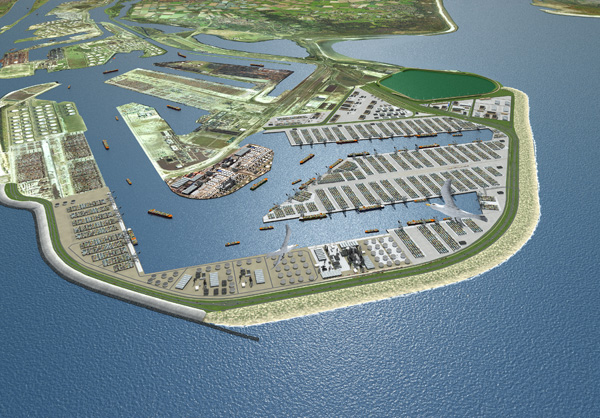
Artist impression of the Maasvlakte 2

The Maasvlakte Rotterdam (or simply the Maasvlakte; Dutch pronunciation: [ˈmaːsflɑktə]) is a massive man-made westward extension of the Europoort port and industrial facility within the Port of Rotterdam. Situated in the municipality of Rotterdam in the Netherlands, the Maasvlakte is built on land reclaimed from the North Sea.

== Creation ==
Before the commencement of the Maasvlakte project, the region was a sandbank which was hazardous to shipping. The Maasvlakte was created in the 1960s by reclaiming land from the North Sea through dykes and sand suppletion. The sand for the suppletion was largely taken from the North Sea and the Lake of Oostvoorne. This lake was created by the construction of the Maasvlakte. Fossils were (and can still be) found in the sand.

An expansion called "Second Maasvlakte" or Maasvlakte 2 was built between September 2008 and May 2013 by spraying sand on the bottom of the North Sea. This project extended the port of Rotterdam by about 2,000 hectares.

== Sections ==
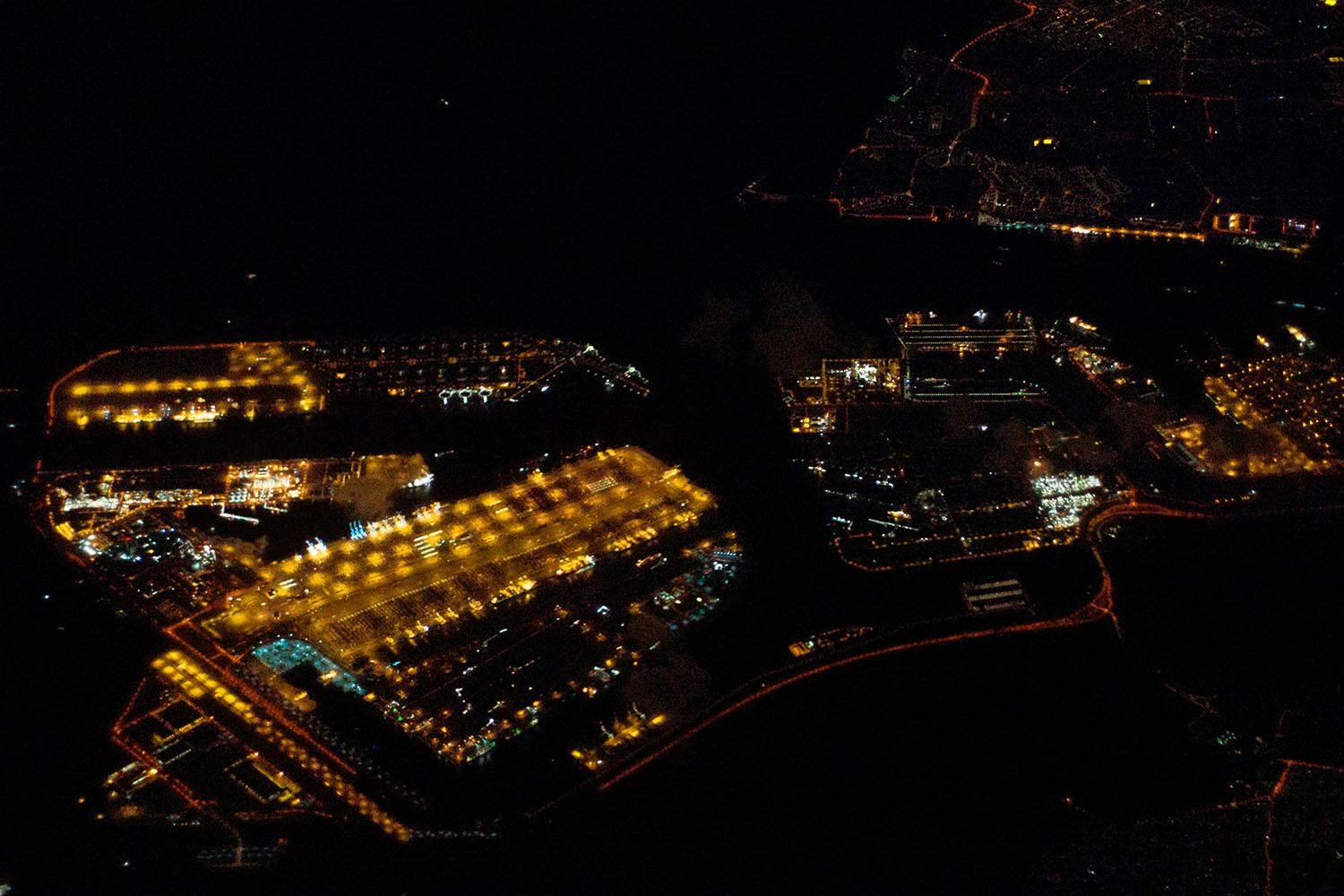
Aerial view of north-western part of Maasvlakte at night with large container terminals area

=== Bulk handling ===
In 1973 EMO started as the first company at Maasvlakte. They are the biggest bulk terminal in western Europe and are located at the Mississippihaven. In 1989 Frans Swarttouw started building a deep water terminal at the Amazonhaven which, in 1990, was sold to EMO.

Deep-water access to Rotterdam allows the world's largest ore carriers to visit Rotterdam.

=== Container terminals ===
The Maasvlakte features various big companies and some smaller ones. Maersk, Europe Container Terminals (ECT), which is a member of the Hutchison Port Holdings group, and Euromax are three big container terminals located here. They can all accommodate the world's largest ships.

On the new Maasvlakte new container terminals will be built. Danish shipping group Maersk has an existing terminal on the original Maasvlakte and will build a new terminal on the second Maasvlakte. With this new terminal Maersk will invest approximately €100 million.

=== Distribution centres ===
A special section has been reserved for large distribution centres: the Rotterdam Distribution Centre. The biggest are Reebok, DHL and Kloosterboer. The Reebok Distribution Centre takes care of the distribution of shoes and apparel for all of Europe. Kloosterboer stores mostly chips from the nearby Farm Frites company.

=== Slufter ===
On one side of the Maasvlakte is the Slufter. Inside the Slufter, a very deep pit shielded from the surrounding area, toxic waste and polluted sand is stored. When it is filled it will be covered and left there.

It is expected to be fully filled around the year 2025; so far it is about half-full.

The area was formerly used for recreational activities such as kite surfing, and the Slufterbeach nearby was also used as nude beach. Since 2010 the road that ran around the Slufter has been closed to public traffic.

=== Power station ===
A power station located in the area is run by Uniper. It is a coal-fired power station generating 1040 megawatts. It dates from 1988, but there are plans for a new plant on the same location.

== Connections ==
There are direct rail links to elsewhere in Europe, especially Germany. The rivers Rhine and Maas enter the sea next to it. This creates good connections for rivergoing vessels. The A15 motorway, which runs into Germany, ends on the Maasvlakte.

The Maasvlakte is also the starting point of the Betuweroute freight railway to Germany.

== Maasvlakte 2 ==
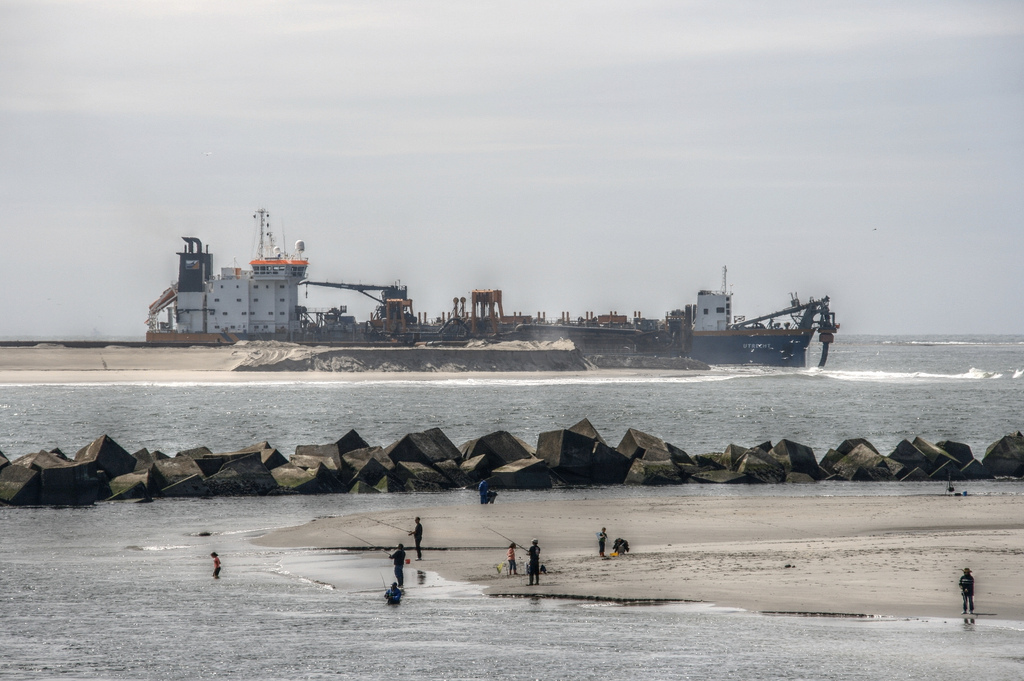
Construction of the Maasvlakte 2 in 2009

An extension, Maasvlakte 2, was begun in 2008. Maasvlakte 2 will cover 1000 hectares net of industrial sites, located directly on deep water. This new part of the Maasvlakte opened in 2013. To accommodate larger container ships the Maasgeul, which is the channel in the North Sea providing deep-water access to the Rotterdam area, has to be widened to over 800 metres.
