= Port of Rotterdam =

Seaport in the Netherlands

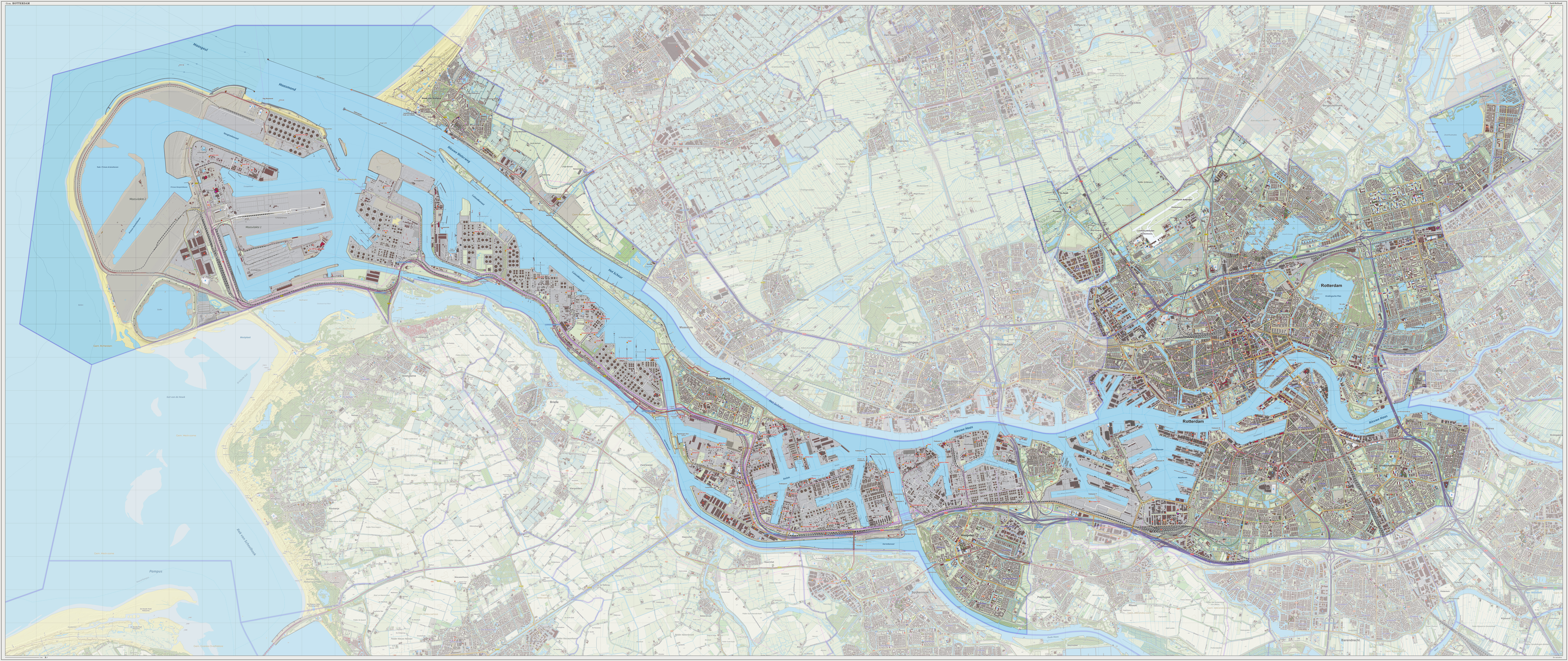
- Interactive map of Port of Rotterdam
- Location within Netherlands

Location
- Country: Netherlands
- Location: Rotterdam; South Holland
- Coordinates: 51.8850°N 4.2867°E
- UN/LOCODE: NL RTM

Details
- Opened: 14th century
- Type of Harbor: Seaport
- Size of harbour: 4,810 ha (11,900 acres)
- Land area: 7,903 ha (19,530 acres)
- Size: 12,713 ha (31,410 acres)
- Employees: 1,270 (2021)
- Chief Executive Officer: Boudewijn Siemons
- Chief Operating Officer: Berte Simons
- Chief Financial Officer: Vivienne de Leeuw

Statistics
- Vessel arrivals: ▲28,876 sea ships (2021)
- Annual cargo tonnage: ▼428.4 million tonnes (2025)
- Annual container volume: ▲14.2 million TEU (2025)
- Annual revenue: ▲€ 772.7 million (2021)
- Net income: ▼€ 247.2 million net profit (2021)
- Inland vessels: 99,558 ships (2021)
- Website www.portofrotterdam.com

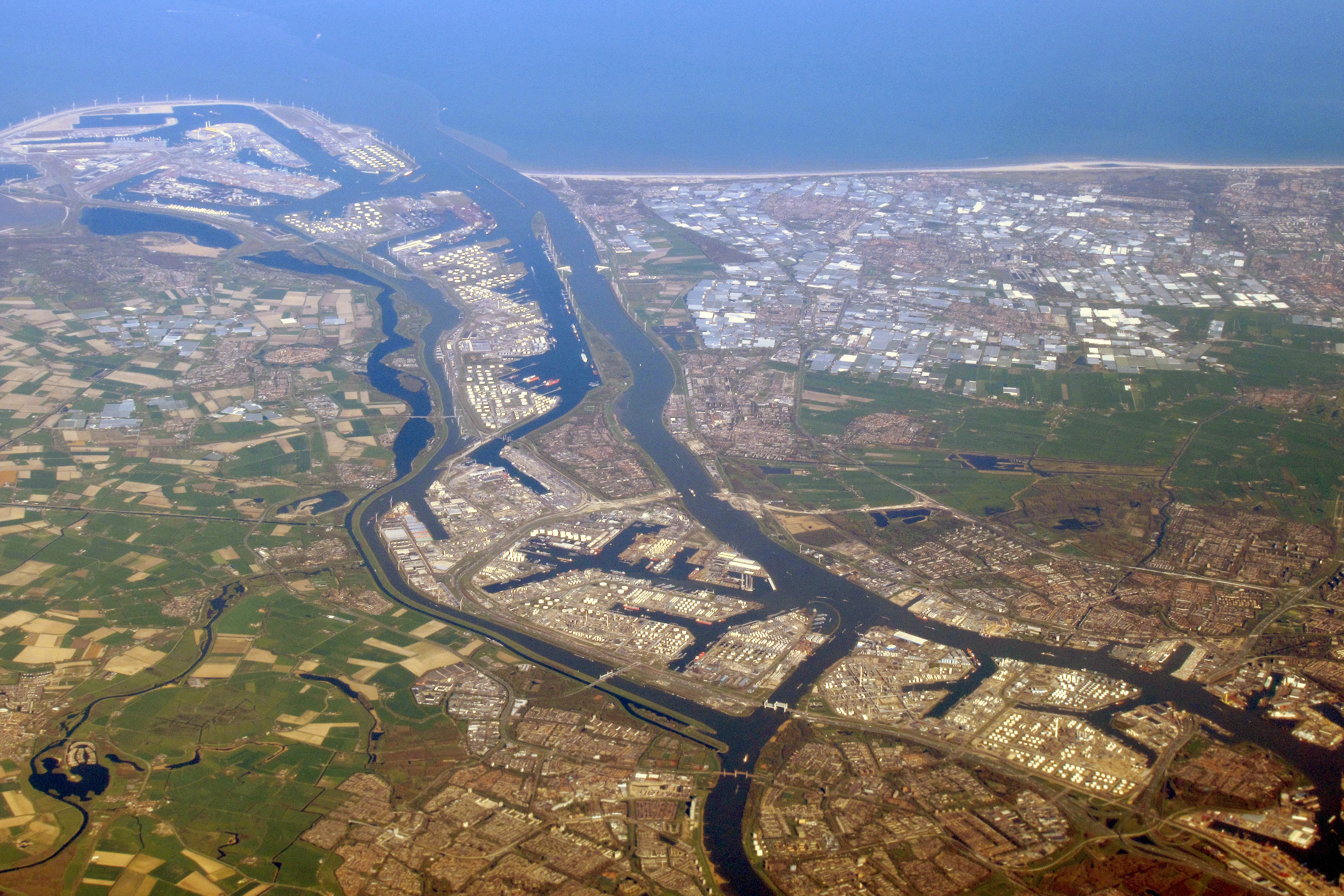
Aerial view

The Port of Rotterdam is the largest seaport in Europe, and the world's largest seaport outside of Asia, located in and near the city of Rotterdam, in the province of South Holland in the Netherlands. From 1962 until 2004, it was the world's busiest port by annual cargo tonnage. It was overtaken first in 2004 by the port of Singapore, and since then by Shanghai and other very large Chinese seaports. In 2020, Rotterdam was the world's tenth-largest container port in terms of twenty-foot equivalent units (TEU) handled. In 2017, Rotterdam was also the world's tenth-largest cargo port in terms of annual cargo tonnage.

Covering 105 square kilometres (41 sq mi), the port of Rotterdam stretches over a distance of 40 kilometres (25 mi). It consists of the city centre's historic harbour area, including Delfshaven; the Maashaven/Rijnhaven/Feijenoord complex; the harbours around Nieuw-Mathenesse; Waalhaven; Vondelingenplaat; Eemhaven; Botlek; Europoort, situated along the Calandkanaal, Nieuwe Waterweg and Scheur (the latter two being continuations of the Nieuwe Maas); and the reclaimed Maasvlakte area, which projects into the North Sea. The Port of Rotterdam is located in the middle of the Rhine-Meuse-Scheldt delta. Rotterdam has five port concessions (ports) within its boundaries—operated by separate companies under the overall authority of Rotterdam.

Rotterdam consists of five distinct port areas and three distribution parks that facilitate the needs of a hinterland with over 500,000,000 consumers throughout the continent of Europe.

== Nieuwe Waterweg ==
In the first half of the 19th century the port activities moved from the centre westward towards the North Sea. To improve the connection to the North Sea, the Nieuwe Waterweg ("New Waterway"), a large canal, was designed to connect the Rhine and Meuse rivers to the sea. The Nieuwe Waterweg, designed by Pieter Caland, was to be partly dug, then to further deepen the canal bed by the natural flow of the water. Ultimately however, the last part had to be dug by manual labour as well. Nevertheless, Rotterdam from then on had a direct connection between the sea and harbour areas with sufficient depth. The Nieuwe Waterweg has since been deepened several times. It was ready in 1872 and all sorts of industrial activity formed on the banks of this canal.

== Europoort and Maasvlakte extensions ==
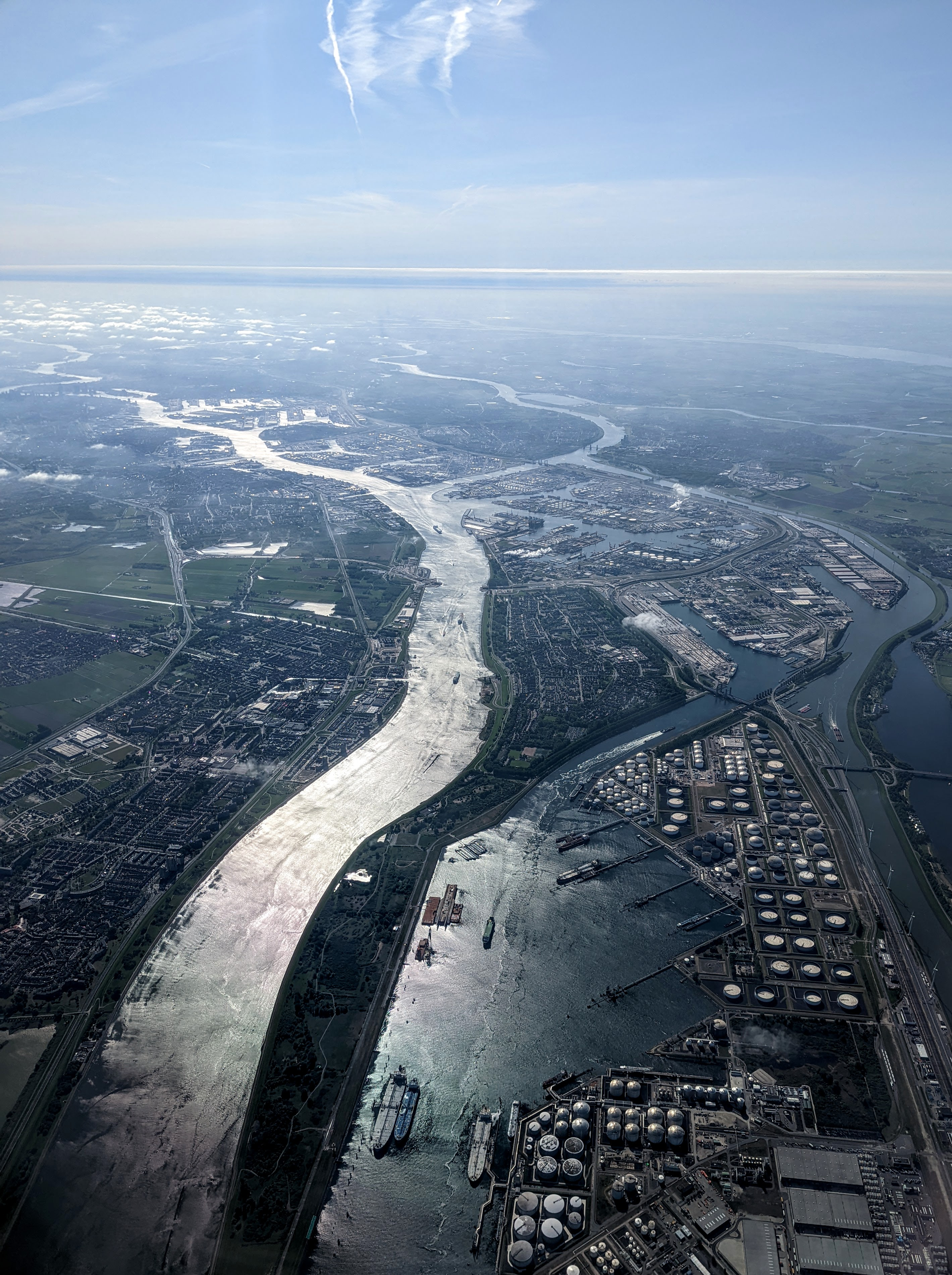
Europoort Rotterdam and Nieuwe Waterweg

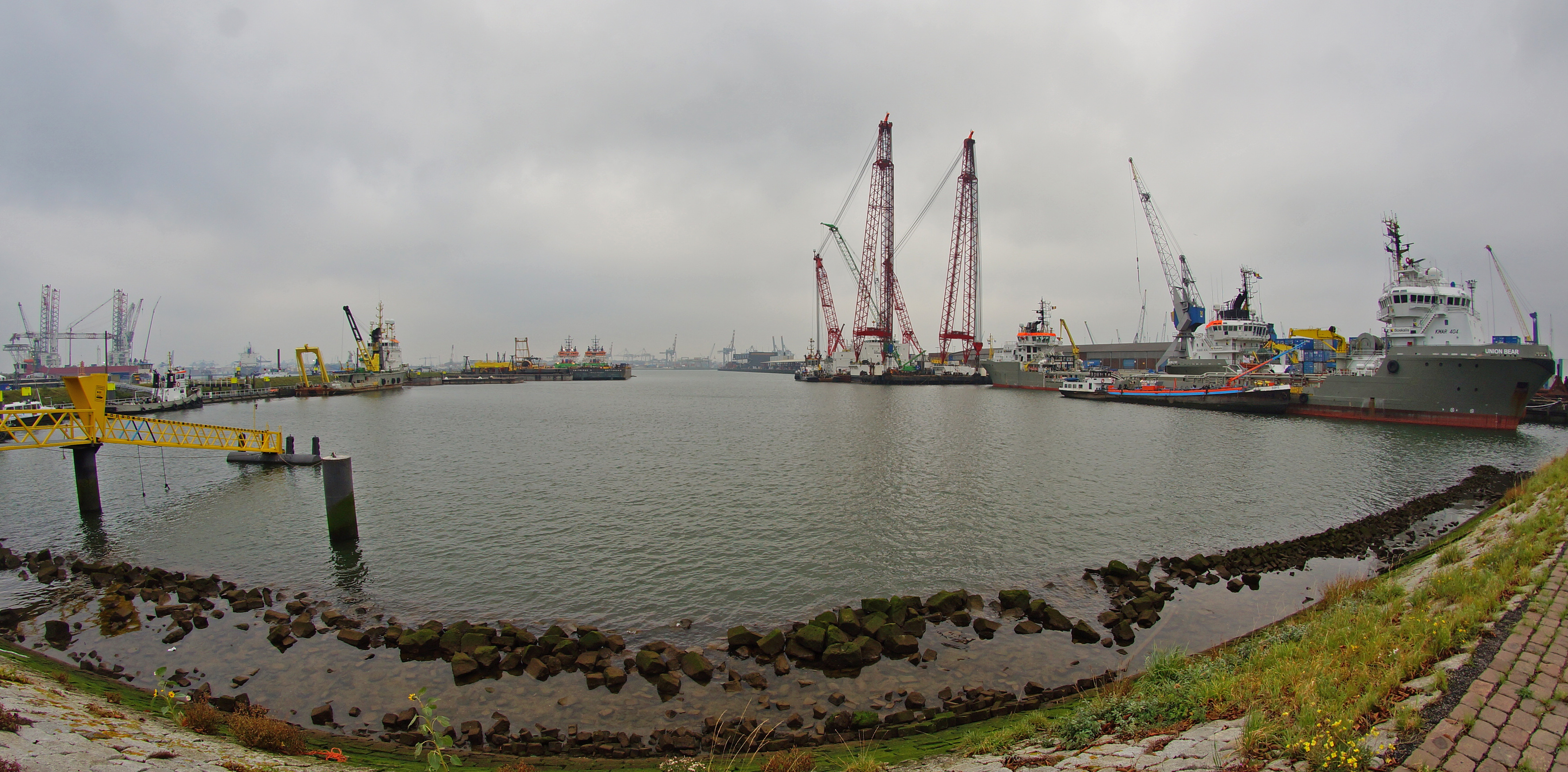
The Waalhaven

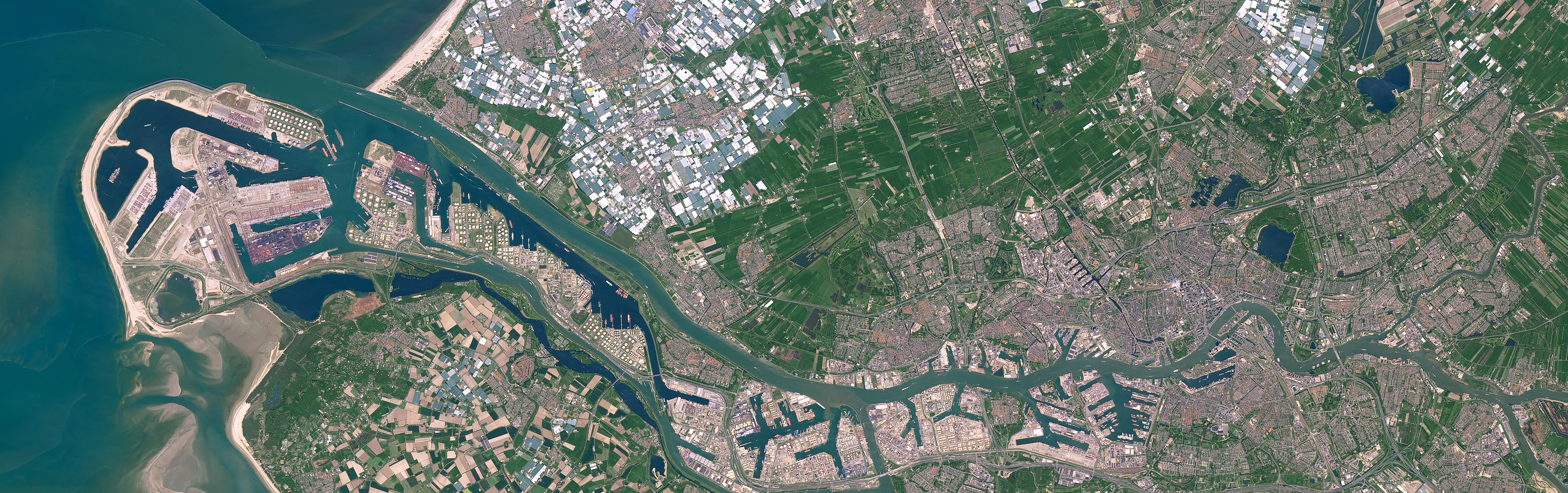
Satellite photography of the Port of Rotterdam

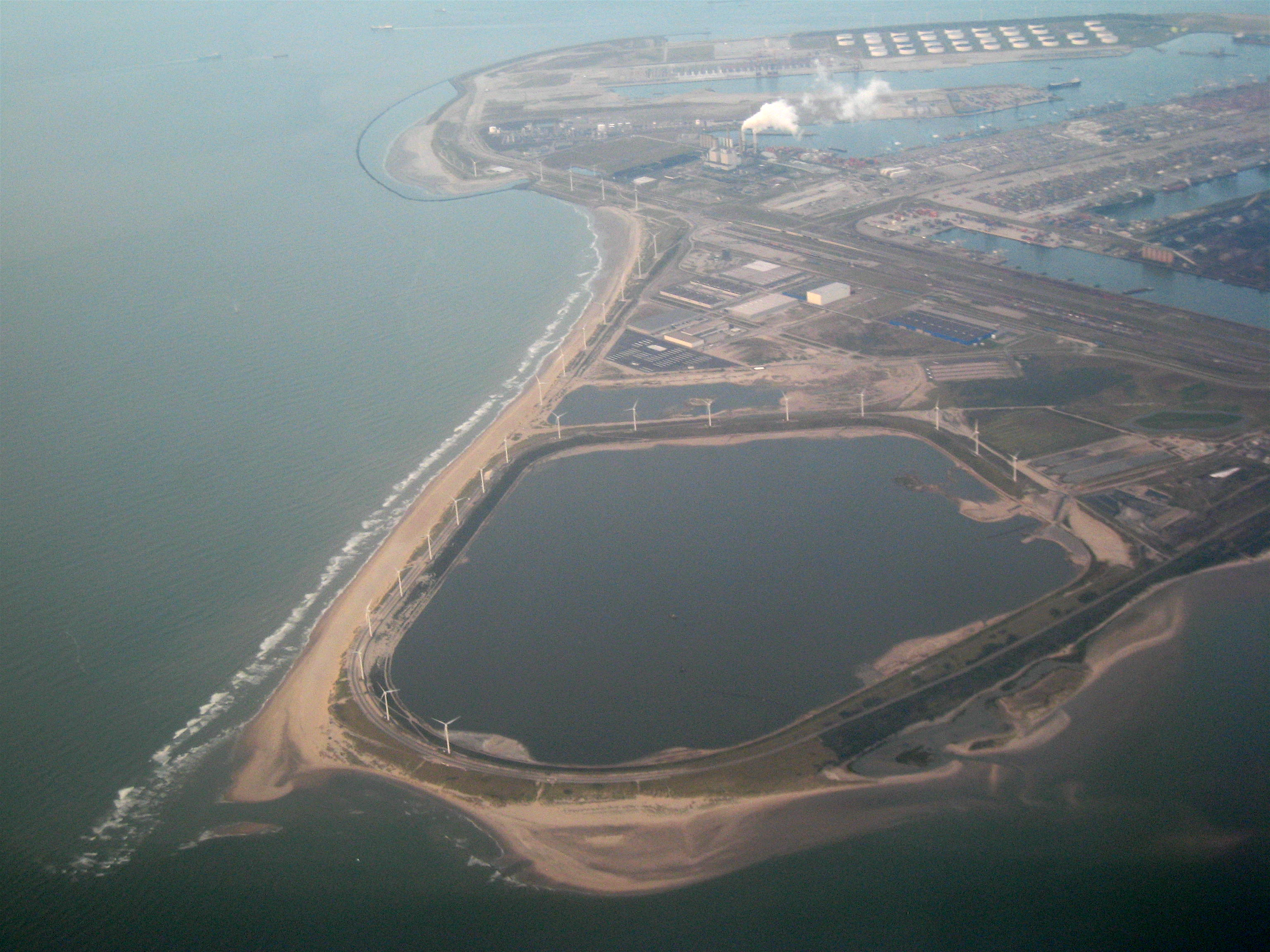
Aerial view of the Maasvlakte area, one of the latest extensions to the port (NB picture taken before construction of Maasvlakte 2)

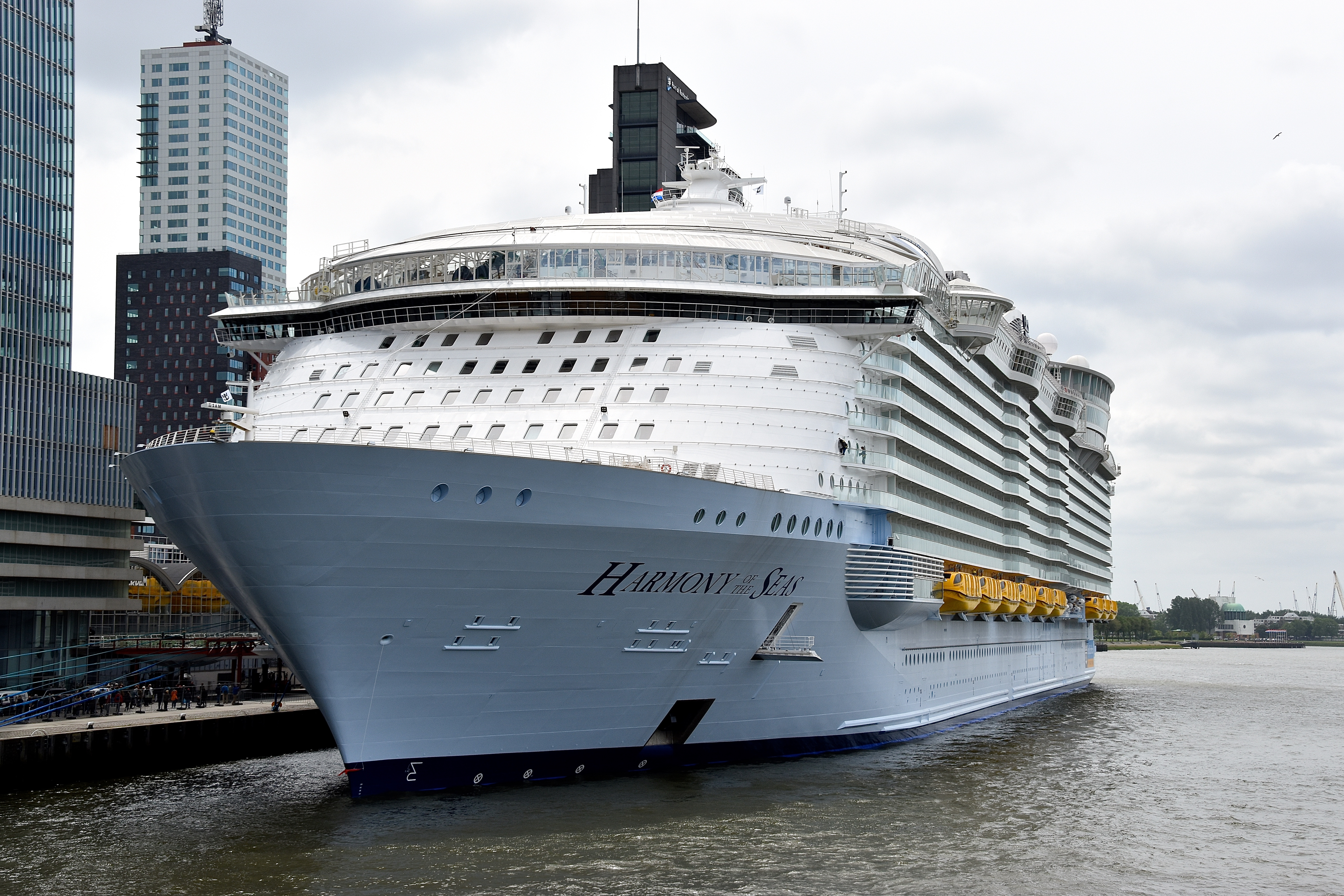
Cruiseship Harmony of the Seas docked in Rotterdam

Over the years the port was further developed seaward by building new docks and harbour-basins. Rotterdam's harbour territory has been enlarged by the construction of the Europoort (gate to Europe) complex along the mouth of the Nieuwe Waterweg. In the 1970s the port was extended into the sea at the south side of the mouth of the Nieuwe Waterweg by completion of the Maasvlakte (Meuse-plain) which was built in the North Sea near Hook of Holland.

In the past five years the industrialised skyline has been changed by the addition of large numbers of wind turbines taking advantage of the exposed coastal conditions. The construction of a second Maasvlakte received initial political approval in 2004, but was stopped by the Raad van State (the Dutch Council of State, which advises the government and parliament on legislation and governance) in 2005, because the plans did not take enough account of environmental issues. On 10 October 2006, however, approval was acquired to start construction in 2008, aiming for the first ship to anchor in 2013.

== Characteristics ==
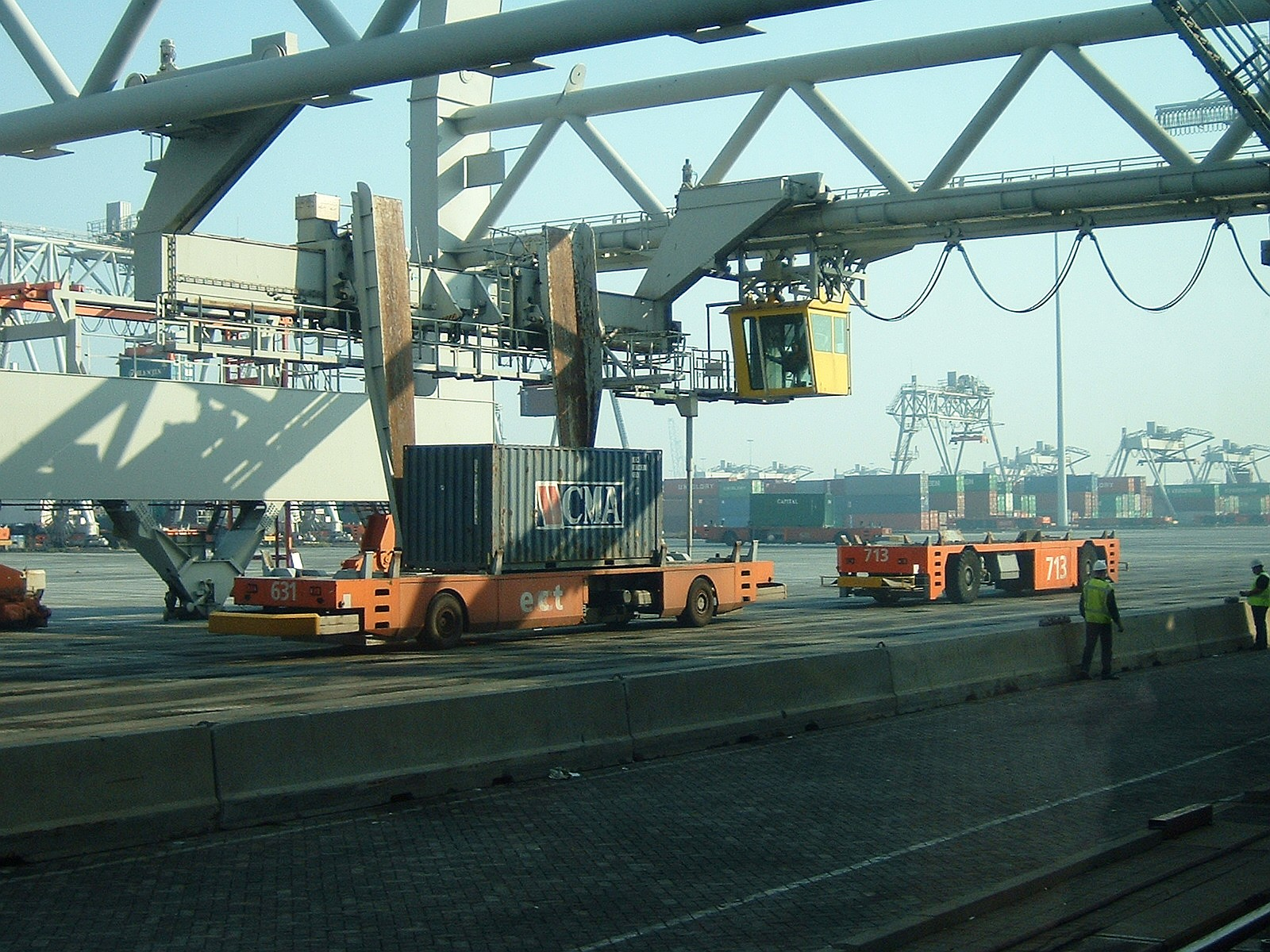
Container terminals showing a container being loaded onto an unmanned automated guided vehicle

Most important for the port of Rotterdam is the petrochemical industry and general cargo transshipment handlings. The harbour functions as an important transit point for transport of bulk and other goods between the European continent and other parts of the world. From Rotterdam goods are transported by ship, river barge, train or road. Since 2000 the Betuweroute, a fast cargo railway from Rotterdam to Germany, has been under construction. The Dutch part of this railway opened in 2007. Large oil refineries are located west of the city. The rivers Meuse (Maas) and Rhine also provide excellent access to the pan-European hinterland.

=== 24-metre draft ===
The EECV-quay of the port has a draft of 24 metres (78 feet). This made it one of only two available mooring locations for one of the largest bulk cargo ships in the world, the iron ore bulk carrier MS Berge Stahl when it is fully loaded, along with the Terminal of Ponta da Madeira in Brazil, until the opening of a new deep-water iron ore wharf at Caofeidian in China in 2011. The ship's draft of 23 meters (75 feet) leaves only 1 metre (3 feet) of under keel clearance, therefore it can only dock in a restricted tidal window. Such ships must travel in the Eurogeul waterway.

=== Robotic container operations ===
Much of the container loading and stacking in the port is handled by autonomous robotic cranes and computer controlled chariots. Europe Container Terminals, which operates two major container terminals at the port, pioneered the development of terminal automation. At the Delta terminal, the chariots—or automated guided vehicles (AGV)—are unmanned and each carries one container. The chariots navigate their own way around the terminal with the help of a magnetic grid built into the terminal tarmac. Once a container is loaded onto an AGV, it is identified by infrared "eyes" and delivered to its designated place within the terminal. This terminal is also named "the ghost terminal".

Unmanned Automated Stacking Cranes (ASC) take containers to/from the AGVs and store them in the stacking yard. The newer Euromax terminal implements an evolution of this design that eliminates the use of straddle carriers for the land-side operations.

=== Smart technology ===
The Port Authority at the Port of Rotterdam uses the Internet of Things, a cloud-based platform, to collect and process data from sensors around the port. In May 2019, the port sent Container 42 out on a two-year data-collecting mission.

== Urban renewal in vacant port areas ==
As early as 1892, the Leuvehaven attracted the first museum visitors. Art lovers could view one of Van Gogh's first exhibitions in the art gallery at number 74 Leuvehaven. At the time, no one would have thought that the harbor itself would have become a museum a hundred years later. In 1979 the Maritime Museum opened the museum ship the Buffel in the Leuvehaven. That ship used to serve for the Dutch navy. On April 16, 1983, the Maritime Museum was built at the head of the Leuvehaven. It opened in 1986. The Maritime Museum (Havenmuseum, merged with the Maritime Museum since 2014) filled the rest of the harbor with ships. The Leuvehaven is still a home port for a small number of inland vessels.

The Oude Haven is one of the oldest ports of Rotterdam. It is located in the center of the city, south-east of Rotterdam Blaak station. Today the Oude Haven is a well-known and busy nightlife area with cafes and restaurants with terraces on the water, close to the famous Kubuswoningen, the Witte Huis and the adjacent Mariniersmuseum. Rotterdam University of Applied Sciences has a location nearby.

The most important project in this development is the Kop van Zuid - an area on the south bank of the Nieuwe Maas, directly opposite the city center. The area has not been used as a port since the German bombing in 1940 and fell into disrepair in the decades that followed. In 1993 the Hotel New York, former office building of the Holland America Lines (Nederlandsch Amerikaansche Stoomvaart Maatschappij), opened. With the construction of the Erasmusbrug in 1996, the city created a direct connection between the two banks of the Meuse. Since then, numerous public buildings such as the Luxor theater, several museums, but also office and residential high-rises have been built. In March 2020 it was announced that the Rijnhaven will be partially filled in after 2024 and used for residential construction and the construction of a city park. The Posthumalaan will then become a city boulevard with high residential towers and the Wilhelminaplein and Rijnhaven underground stations will be renovated. In the meantime, the Floating Office Rotterdam (FOR) opened in September 2021 on the Antoine Platekade and accommodates the Global Center on Adaptation. The FOR also includes a restaurant and an outdoor swimming pool. This is a project in the context of the Rotterdam Climate Initiative (RCI).

== Administration ==
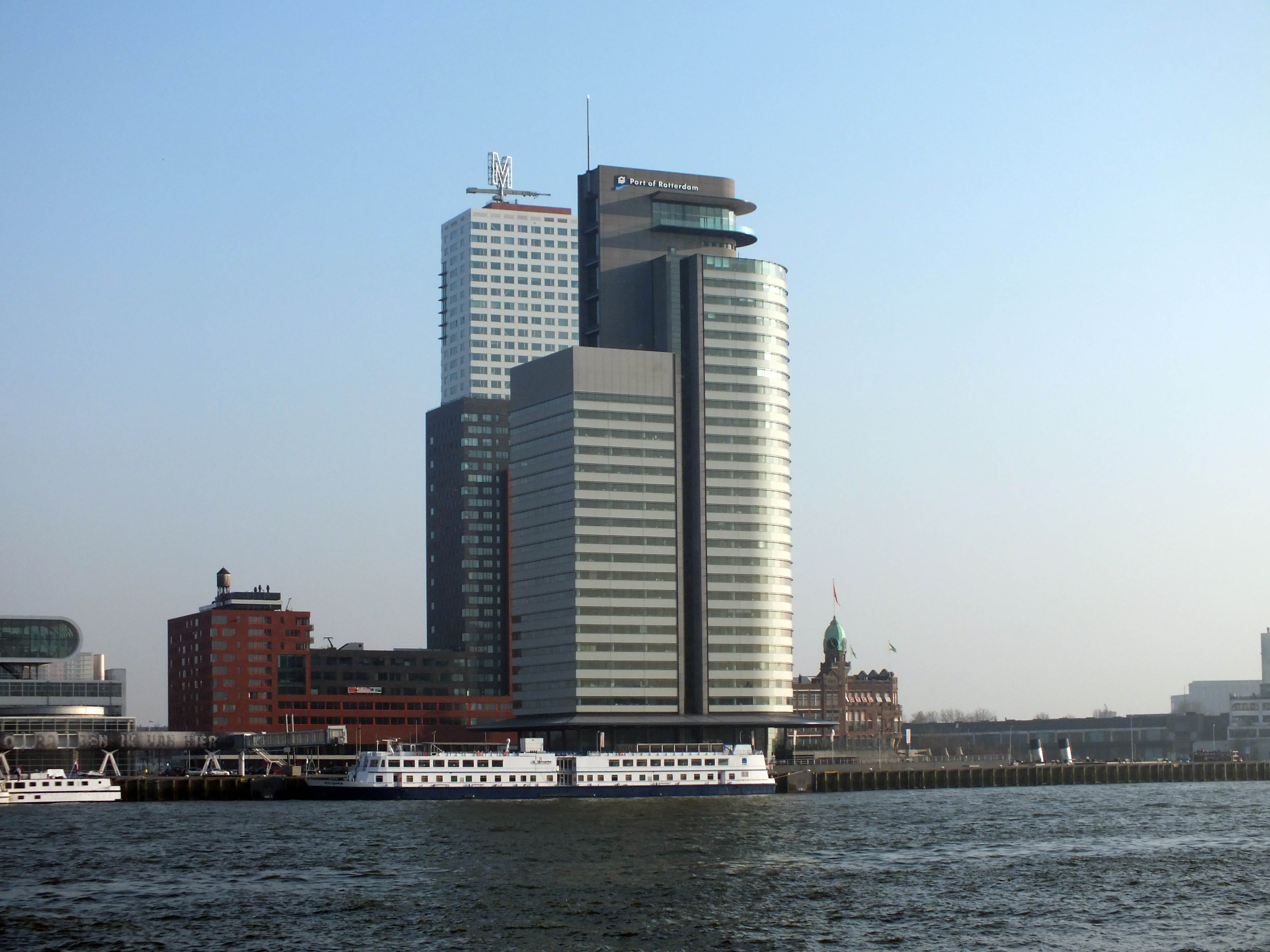
The main office of the Port of Rotterdam

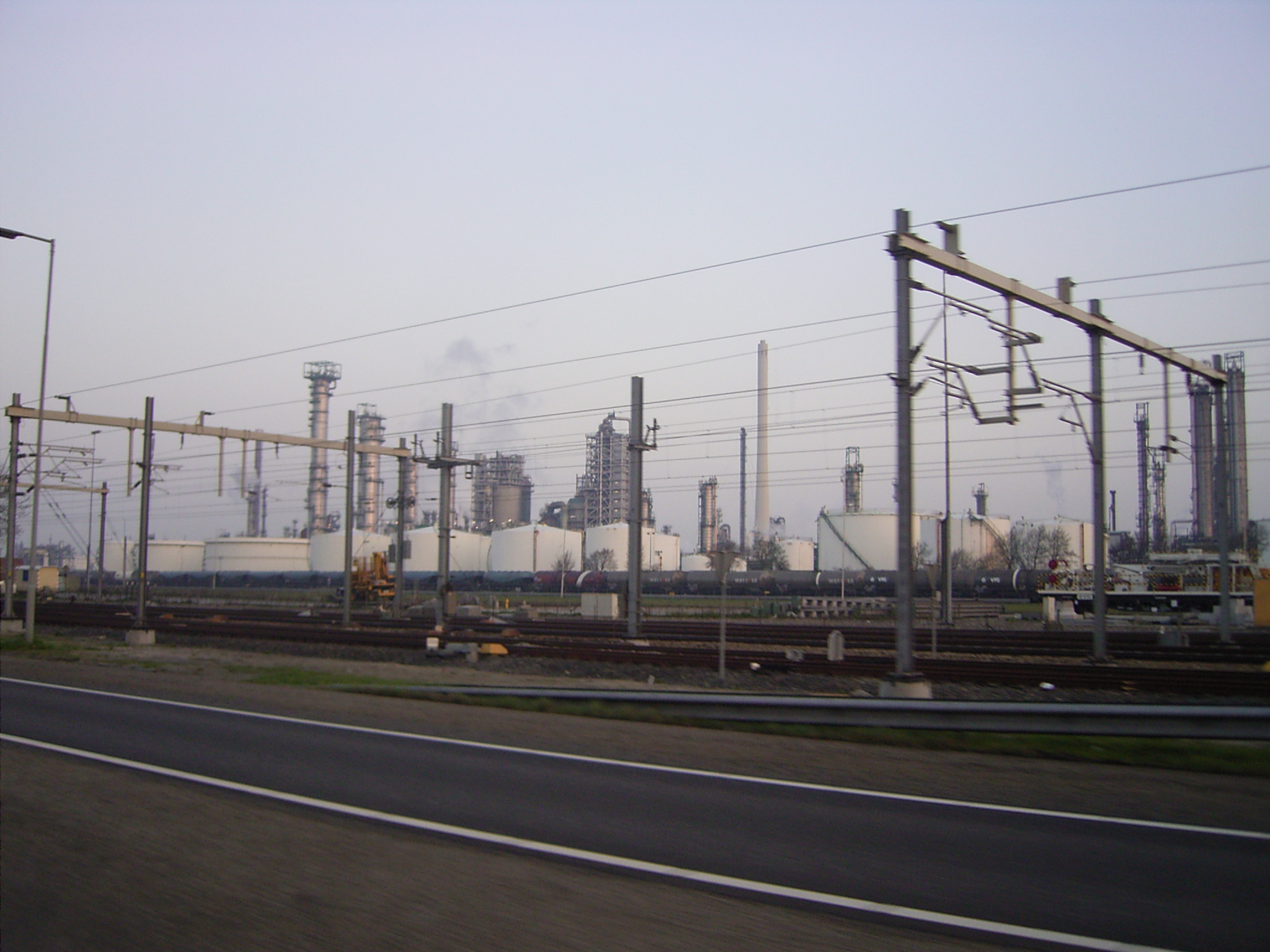
Raillinks and refineries in the Europoort area of the port.

The port is operated by the Port of Rotterdam Authority, originally a municipal body of the municipality of Rotterdam, but since 1 January 2004, a government corporation jointly owned by the municipality of Rotterdam and the Dutch State.

== Flood barriers ==
The Port of Rotterdam and its surrounding area is susceptible to a storm surge from the North Sea. As part of the Delta Works plan, the Maeslantkering flood barrier was constructed from 1991 to 1997 to protect the area. This flood barrier consists of two huge doors that normally rest in a dry dock besides the Nieuwe Waterweg. When a flood of 3 metres (9.8 ft) above NAP (mean sea level) is predicted, the barrier is activated. The dry dock is flooded, and the gates rotate around a pivot to float into position, like caissons, and sunk in place. When the water level recedes enough to open the gates, they are floated back into their docks. Another barrier, the Hartelkering, is situated in the Hartelkanaal.

== Sustainability ==
The Port of Rotterdam aims to be emissions-free by the year 2050. In 2018, the Port Authority CEO launched a EUR 5 million incentive scheme for climate-friendly shipping. According to Benchmarkia's Industrial Park Ranking, Rotterdam Harbour has been ranked 20th among all industrial parks worldwide based on sustainability.

The port participates in the Green Award programme, offering discounts on seaport dues for certified sea-going vessels and using Green Award verification for certain sustainability incentives; the Authority also applies a 5% emissions-data discount on inland port dues via the Green Award system. In 2024, the Port Authority reported €5.6 million in rebates through the Green Award and Environmental Ship Index schemes.

This includes high-power electricity connections that will allow suitably equipped ships to turn off their engines whilst in port, a process known as cold ironing.

== Map of port ==
Port of Rotterdam

== See also ==
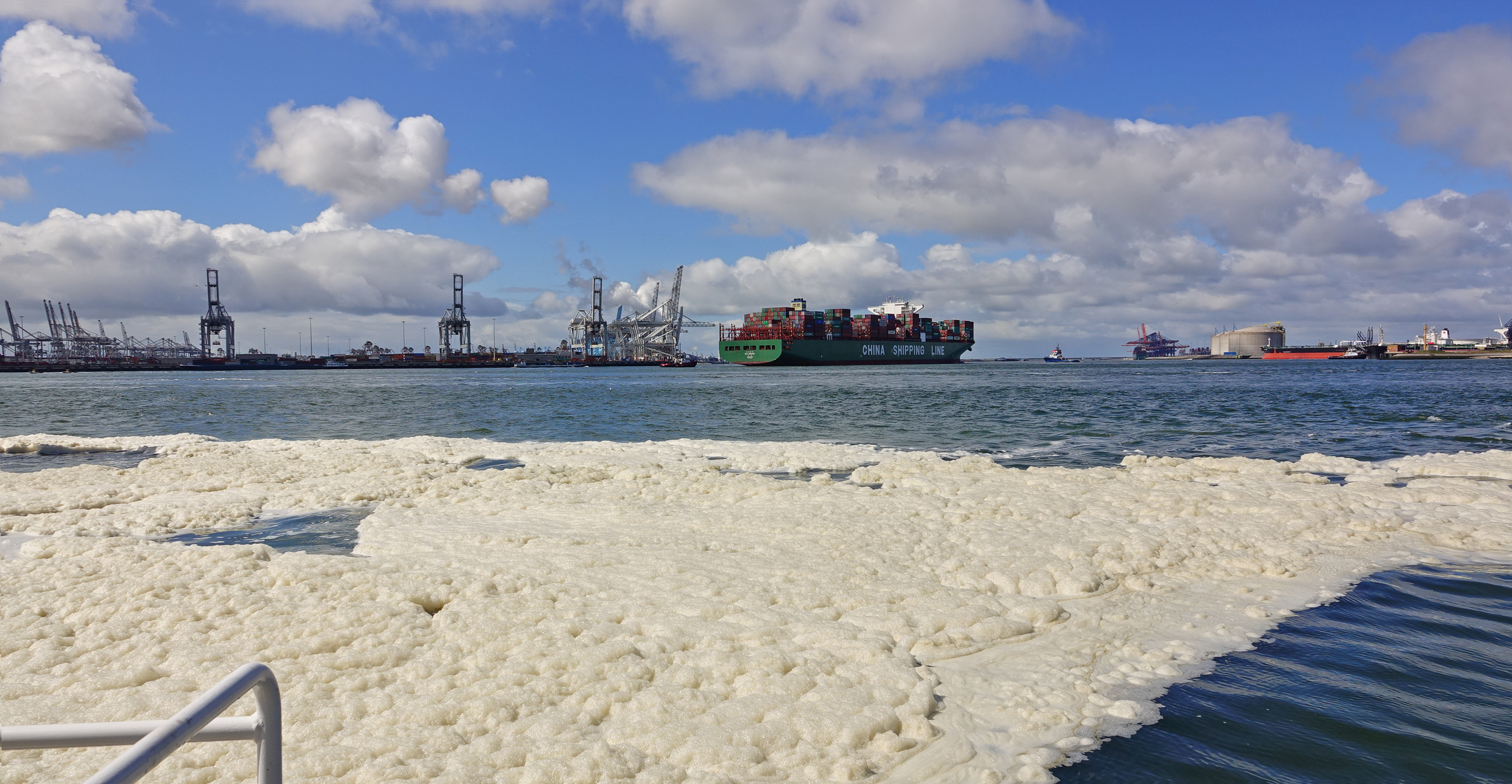
The Yangtzekanaal meets with the Beerkanaal in this photo from April 2017

- Europoort
- Port of Antwerp
- World's busiest ports
