= Eurogeul =

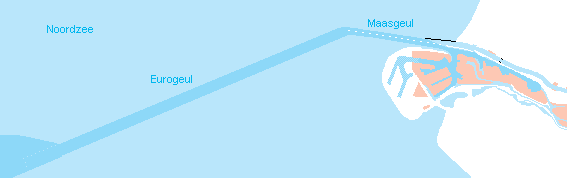
Aerial view of the Eurogeul

The Eurogeul or Euromaasgeul is a channel dug in the North Sea in conjunction with the Port of Rotterdam. It has a length of 57 km and a depth of 23 meters.

== Use ==
The Eurogeul is a so-called deep water route in the Traffic Separation Schemes of the Southern part of the North Sea and the English Channel. Ships with a draft between 14 and 20 meters only need to use the last part of the Eurogeul: the Maasgeul. Ships with a depth of 20 meters or more need to use the entire length of the Eurogeul and will get a pilot on board before entering the Eurogeul. The smaller ships will normally receive their pilot near the pilot station Maascenter buoy.

The Eurogeul allows deep-water sea access to the Port of Rotterdam. At high tide it allows large container-ships and large ore carriers like the MS Berge Stahl or MV Vale Rio de Janeiro to enter Rotterdam.

== Maasgeul ==
The last 14 km section of the Eurogeul before approaching the coastline is called the Maasgeul. Seagoing vessels with a draft of over 20 meters must necessarily take the Eurogeul. Other ships can take the Maasgeul directly. The navigation is strictly regulated. Attendance is about one ship per day (357 for the latest year available). The channel must be dredged and maintained; every year 5 to 7 million tons of sand are recovered. In 2008 the Eurogeul was expanded to an overall width of 600 meters.

In 2012 the Maasgeul was widened to 830 meters, in order to accommodate larger ships. The work was completed in time for the opening of the new Maasvlakte, the Maasvlakte 2.

== See also ==
The IJgeul, a similar but smaller channel dug some years later for the port of Amsterdam.
