= Maasvlakte 2 =

Major civil engineering project extending the Port of Rotterdam on reclaimed land

Coordinates: 51°57′30″N 3°59′00″E

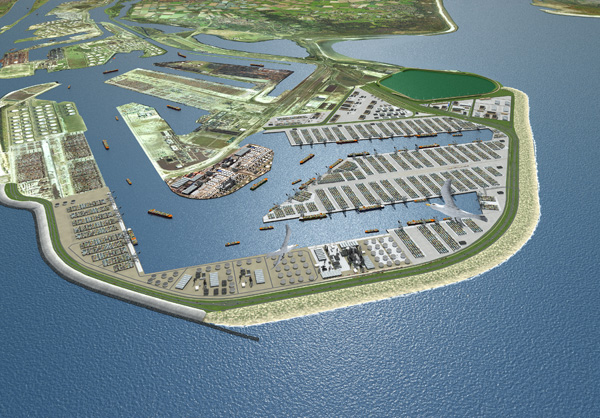
Artist impression of the Maasvlakte 2

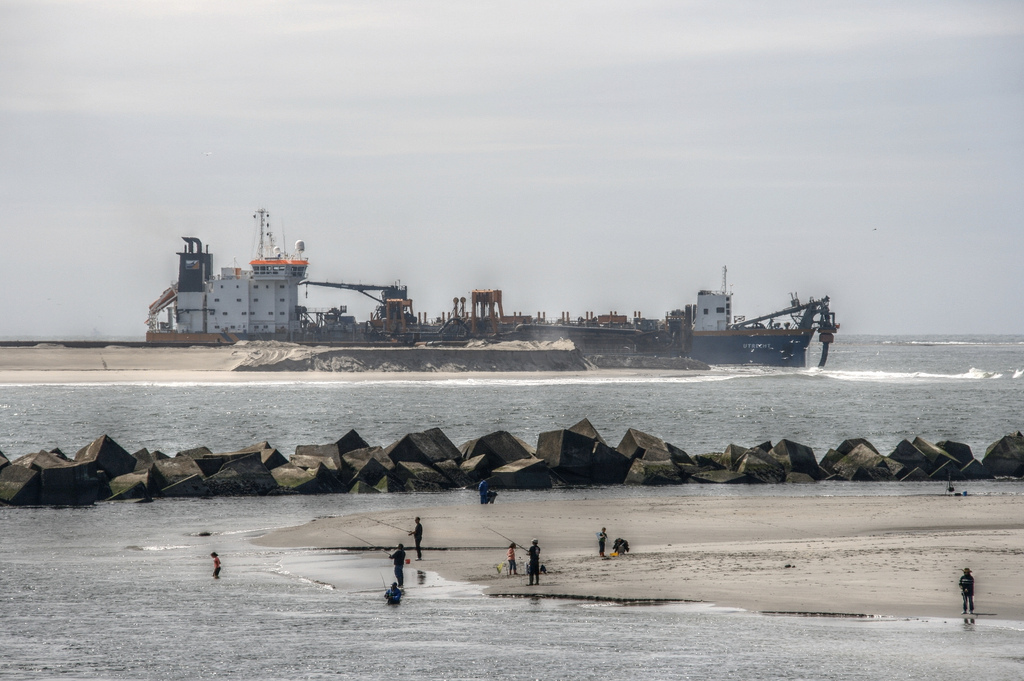
Construction of the Maasvlakte 2 in 2009

Maasvlakte 2 is a major civil engineering project in the Netherlands, constructing a new port and supporting infrastructure on reclaimed land adjoining the Maasvlakte. Approximately 2000 hectares will be reclaimed, behind a 4 km dike; approximately 1000 hectares will be used by ports related industries. It is an extension of the Port of Rotterdam.

Maasvlakte 2 is the biggest civil engineering project in the Netherlands since the Delta Works. The area opened on 22 May 2013.

Container terminal operators APM Terminals and Rotterdam World Gateway began construction of their terminals in 2012. The APM terminal opened in April 2015. Rotterdam World Gateway (RWG) is the main competitor for European Container Terminals (ECT), currently the biggest operator of a container terminal in Rotterdam. RWG's terminal includes a 20-meter deep dock and its own railroad station, and would be capable of handling 2.35 million containers annually.

The Eurogeul was widened in anticipation of increased traffic.

== Intermodal transport ==
Maasvlakte 2 takes advantage of Europoort's existing transport links; it is directly connected to the Betuwe Route.
