= Teun Jacob =

Dutch wall painter and sculptor

- Born: Teunis Jacob; 11 June 1927; Rheden, Netherlands
- Died: 12 October 2009 (aged 82)
- Education: Willem de Kooning Academy
- Known for: Sculpture, painting
- Notable work: Twiggy, Tilburg 1967
- Website: https://rkd.nl/en/explore/artists/41315

Teunis (Teun) Jacob (Rheden, 11 June 1927 - 12 October 2009) was a Dutch wall painter and sculptor, who lived and worked in Rotterdam since the early 1950s. He made both figure and nonrepresentational art.

== Live and work ==
Born in Rheden, Jacob studied fine art at the Willem de Kooning Academy in Rotterdam in the department of drawing and painting. As sculptor he was autodidact.

Since the 1950s Jacob worked as independent artist in Rotterdam. In 1957 Jacob and Ru van Rossem had a major exhibition of his work in the Lijnbaancentrum in Rotterdam. In the next decade he made sculptures for public places in Rotterdam, Spijkernisse and Tilburg.

In 1970 he designed the summer exhibition for the theater museum in Amsterdam. In 1971 he was exhibition architect of the Brussels Pavilion and Downhill Palace in the Park of Culture and Rest Julius Fucik in Prague. In Rotterdam in 1974 he made a sketch design for the district buildings in the boroughs Zuidwijk and IJsselmonde in Rotterdam.

Later in the 1970s, in cooperation with Dutch sculptor Kees Verschuren, he created a massive land art project at the first Maasvlakte, entitled Steen in water (Rock in Water). This industrial area in the Port of Rotterdam was built on the land, reclaiming from the North Sea in the 1960s. In 1974 an initial project team was installed with Jacob, Wout Maters, Leen Droppert and Geert Lebbing, who granted the project to Jacobs and Verschuren. In a period of over five years, adjacent to a power plant, the artists developed an area into the largest work of art in the Netherlands in those days. Other artists participated in the project, such as Marinus Boezem and Carel Visser.

In 1977 Jacob with Dries Wiecherink and Bouke Ylstra were appointed as visual artists at the national Government Buildings Agency under Wim Quist. In 1985 Jacob designed a triangular court with fountain, which was part of a new office building by Abe Bonnema in the center of Leeuwarden.

Over the year Jacob was also lecturer at the Willem de Kooning Academy. With Hans Abelman, Lucien den Arend and Lon Pennock he was an active member of the Bond voor Beeldende Kunst Arbeiders BBK A (Association for Visual Arts Workers). Together with Annet Chavannes he had been one of the driving forces of the trade journal for visual artists the BK-informatie.

== Work ==
In the 1950s Jacob had started as sculptor and came into prominence with an exhibition in the Lijnbaancentrum in 1957. In the next decade he created multiple sculptures in public places. In the 1970s he started working together with more applied work.

=== Gallery ===
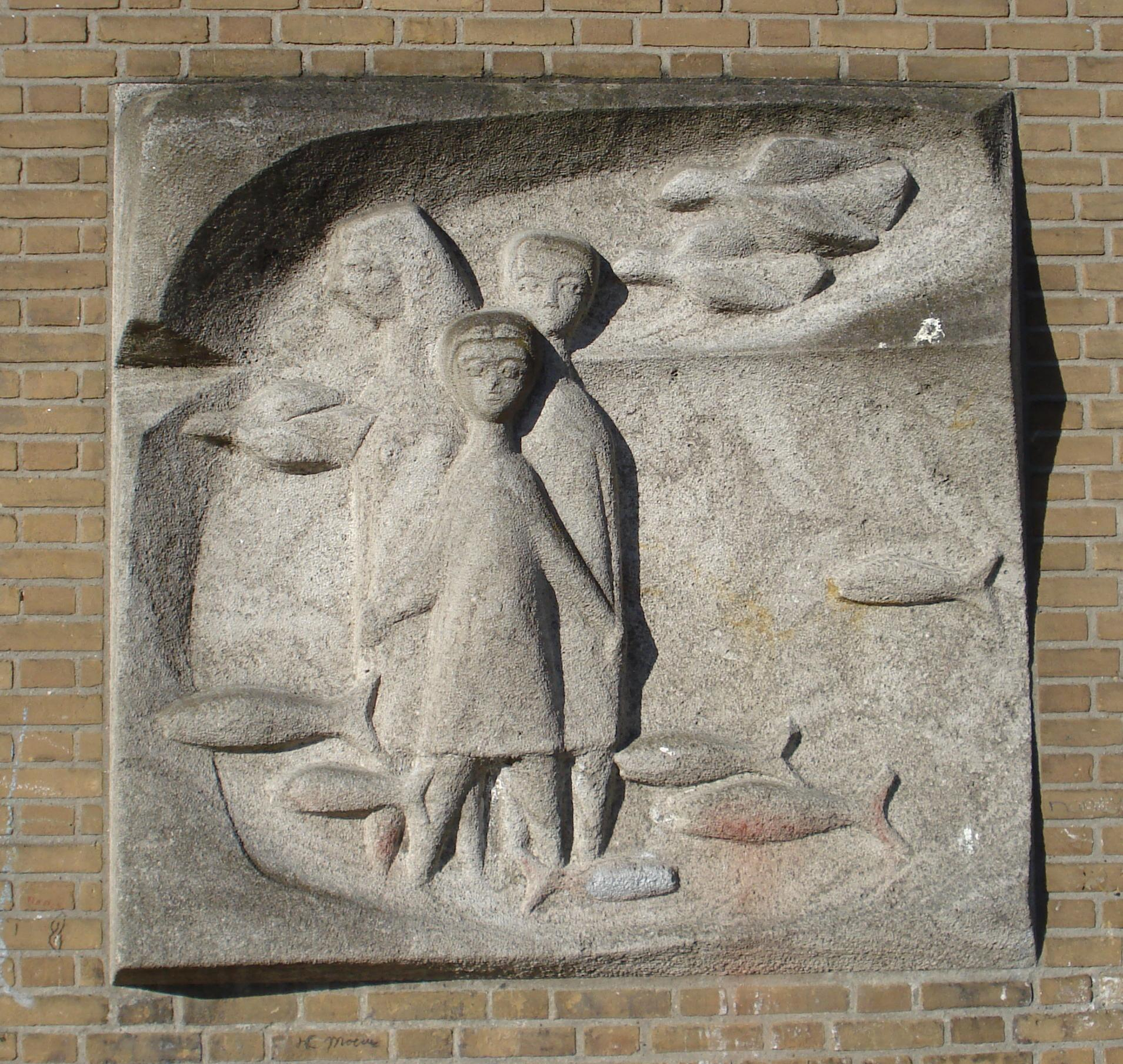
Relief children, Rotterdam 1960

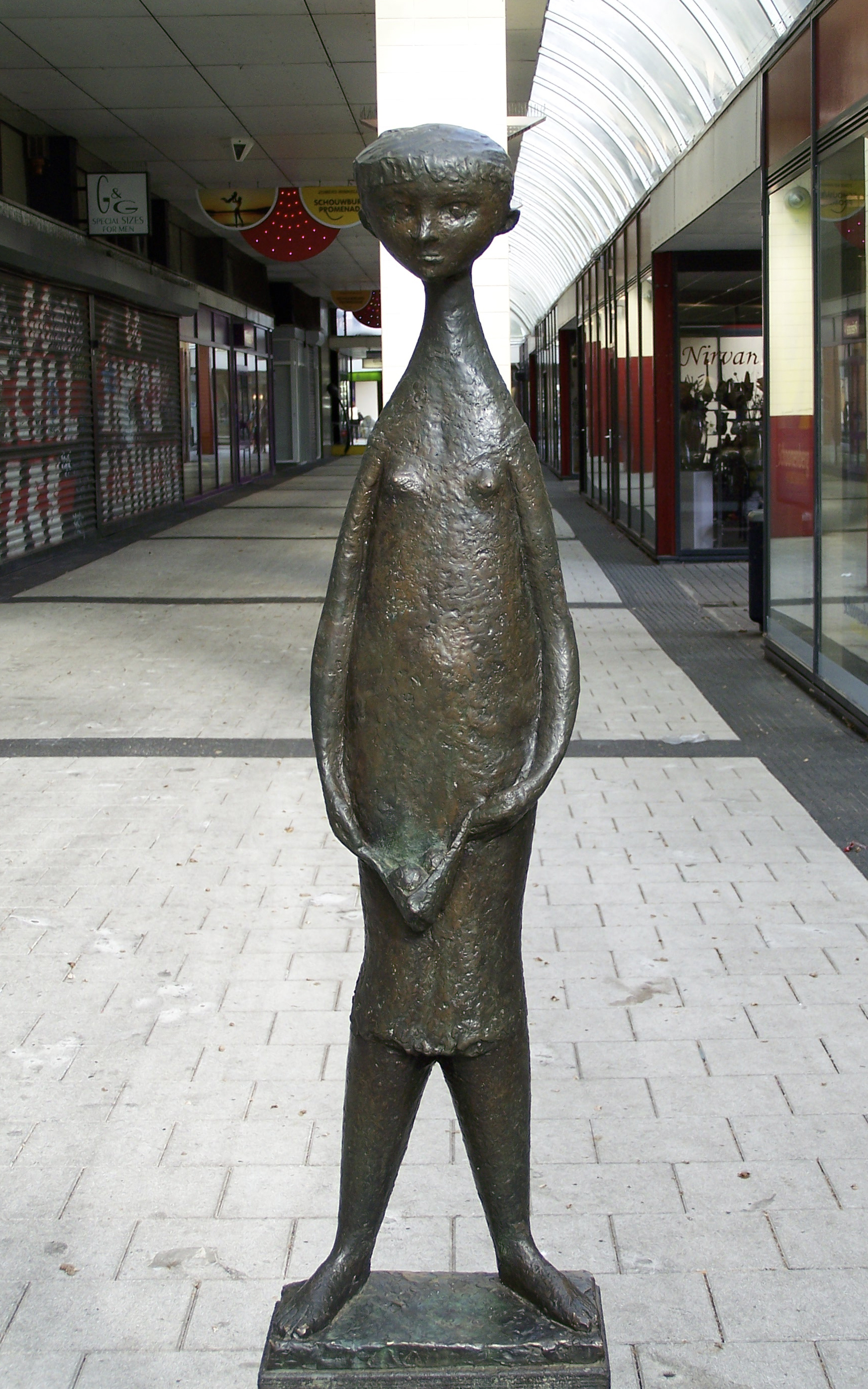
Twiggy, Tilburg 1967

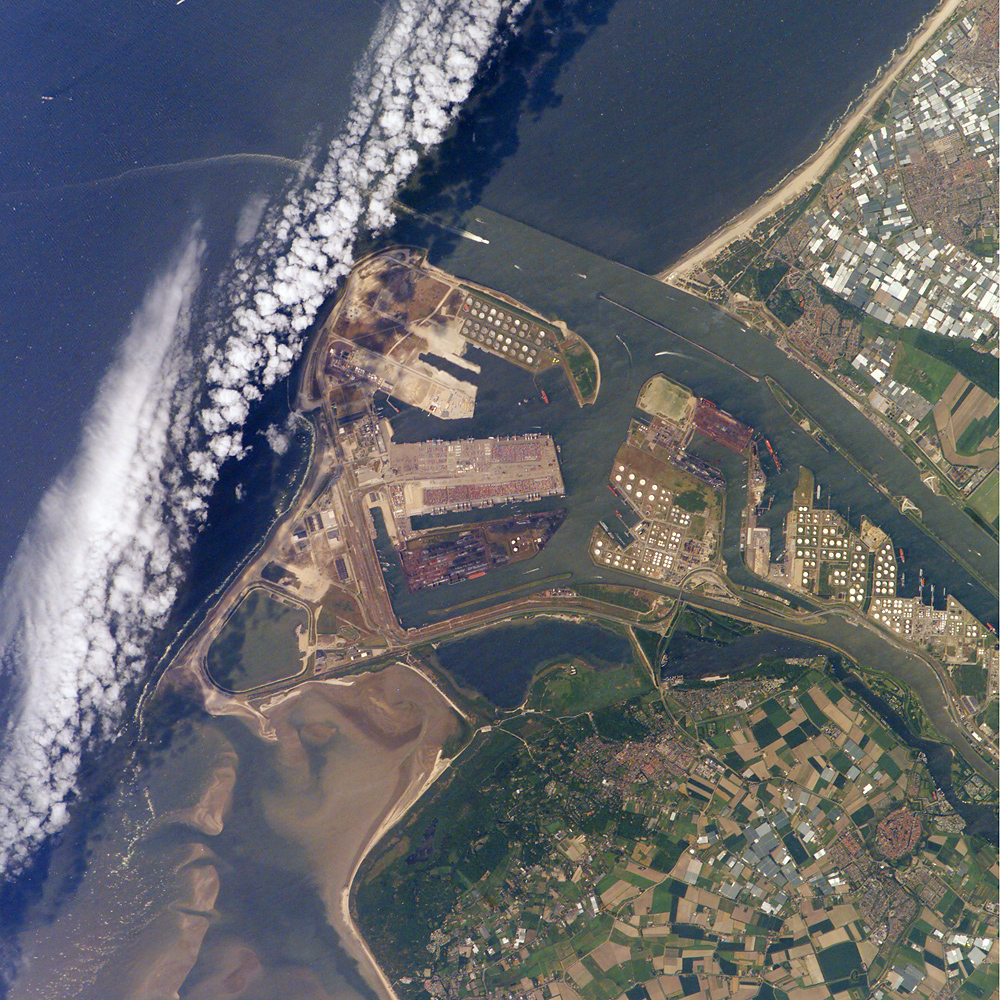
"Rock in Water," land art project on Maasvlakte in 1970s

=== Exhibitions a selection ===
- 1957. Sculptures and graphic work by Teun Jacob and Ru van Rossem. Lijnbaancentrum, Rotterdam.
- 1966. Group exhibition. De Doelen, Rotterdam. H.K. "Niet veel opzienbarends op tweede Doelen-expositie," Het vrĳe volk : democratisch-socialistisch dagblad, Rotterdam, 1966/07/05, p. 5.
- 2015. Steen in Water, TENT Rotterdam.

=== Publications ===
- Sandra Smets and Han Lörzing. Steen in Water – een onbekend aardwerk voor de 1e Maasvlakte. ISBN 978-90-819835-1-8
