= Kees Verschuren =

Dutch artist

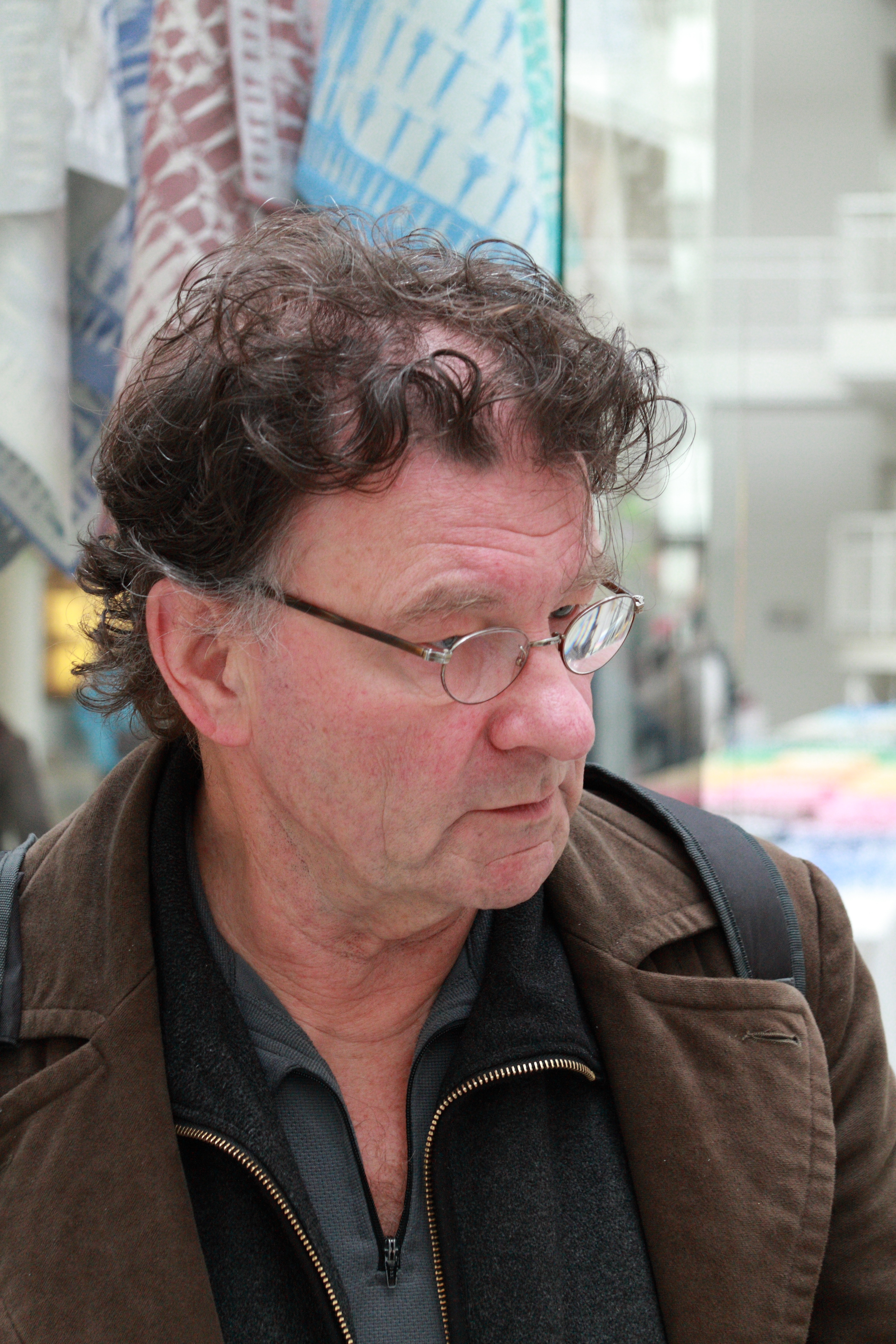
- Verschuren, city hall of The Hague, 2009
- Born: Henricus Petrus Cornelis Verschuren; 29 August 1941 (age 84); Breda, Netherlands
- Education: Royal Academy of Art, The Hague
- Known for: sculpture, painting

Henricus Petrus Cornelis (Kees) Verschuren (born Breda, 29 August 1941) is a Dutch sculptor, painter and former lecturer at the Willem de Kooning Academie in Rotterdam, known for his monumentalist sculptures in public places in the Netherlands.

== Biography ==
Born in Princenhage, a neighbourhood in the southwest of the city Breda, Verschuren graduated from the Royal Academy of Art, The Hague in 1965–66. He and portrait painter Dick Stapel were the only two students, that finished the full-time program in Visual Arts that year. He started as independent artist in The Hague, and came into prominence in the early 1970s as part of new generation of promising artists from The Hague.

After graduation Verschuren also started his career as art teacher at the Municipal Lyceum in Dordrecht. In 1973 Verschuren was appointed lecturer at the Willem de Kooning Academie in Rotterdam in the department of autonomous art, where he taught in concept development. He was also visiting lecturer at the Delft University of Technology and several other art academies in the Netherlands until 2003. Since 1975 he has also worked as art consultant for the municipal of Delft and Rotterdam, for the province Overijssel and several individuals.

As artist Verschuren had started as painter in The Hague, realized several landscape/land art projects in the 1970s and 1980s, realized the monumental Artwork "Sjatoodoo" in Rotterdam in 1989, and had a major solo exhibition in the city hall of Delft in 2001. He is member of the Arti et Amicitiae art society in Amsterdam, and has received scholarships from the Dutch Ministry of Health, Welfare and Sport in 1974, and from the Mondriaan Fonds in 2003.

=== Family ===
Verschuren has four sons. One of them, Kamiel Verschuren, has followed into his father's footsteps and works as conceptual interdisciplinary artist since 1995. Another, Oof Verschuren, works as professional advertising and fashion photographer. And a third son, Zeeger Verschuren, settled as independent filmmaker.

== Work ==
Verschuren is especially known for his monumentalist sculptures in public places in the Netherlands. In the 1960s he had started as painter and participated in the New Hague School. After this figurative movement broke up, he quit painting and started focussing on site-specific art.

=== Dordrecht, 1969 ===
In the late 1960s Verschuren had started as independent artist in The Hague. He also worked as art teacher at the Municipal Lyceum in Dordrecht. In January 1969, with the other two art teachers Lode Pemmelaar and Bep van de Akker, he was fired for holding a survey among their students about their sexual experiences. The intention of that anonymous survey had been to show the whole school community the usefulness of appointing a sexologist.

The teachers had been popular among their pupils for taking the classes to exhibitions of Robert Rauschenberg, Picasso and Hieronymus Bosch. Late 1968 they had asked the school director permission to visit the movie Barbarella (film) for their art class. After initial vague answers, they received an official resignation letter. This situation was one of the many similar educational incidents in the Netherland in year 1969.

=== Rock in Water, 1970s ===
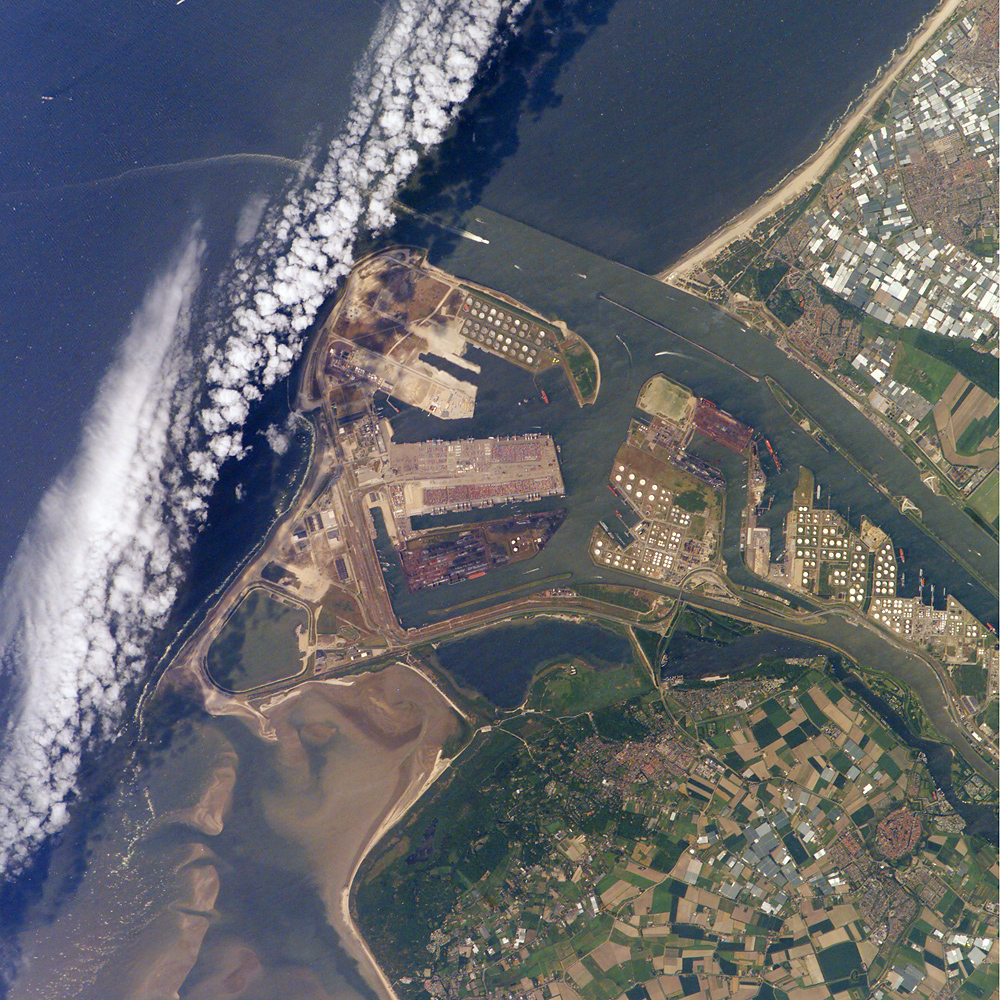
"First" Maasvlakte in 2005, before the construction of the Maasvlakte 2 in 2008.

In the 1970s, in cooperation with Dutch sculptor Teun Jacob (1927–2009), Verschuren created a massive land art project at the first Maasvlakte, entitled Steen in water (Rock in Water). This industrial area in the Port of Rotterdam was built on land reclaimed from the North Sea in the 1960s. In a period of over five years, adjacent to a power plant, the artists developed an area into the largest work of art in the Netherlands in those days. The beeldenmagazine.nl (2015) summarized:

Verschuren and Jacob discovered their own form of Land Art. They combined ideas of earthwork in nature with the environmental art of the Arnhem school. Besides planting, they processed many industrial materials such as asphalt and concrete in their design. It took no less than five years before the project was completed. This had to do with the size but also with the prevailing participation culture, typical of the seventies. For Jacob and Verschuren it was hard working; on meetings and exhibitions, there was little interest while afterwards they received all kinds of criticism. The land art of Jacob and Verschuren is slowly disappearing with the advent of new plants and the operation of nature.

The environmental artwork was commissioned by the Government of Rotterdam and the local electric power company, who operated the power plant. In the course of the land art project the land was held in a constant flux of construction, combining "industrial materials with a vegetation structure which had to withstand the North Sea storms." Among other artists, that participated in the project, were Marinus Boezem and Carel Visser.

=== Cooperation with Lon Pennock ===
Later in the 1970s and in the 1980s Verschuren cooperated with the sculptor and environmental artist Lon Pennock in several projects. In 1975 Pennock and Verschuren were commissioned to create an artwork for the new tax office in the city of Helmond. The Regional Historical Center Eindhoven (2015) recalled about this project:

The percentage scheme for art in government buildings was applicable here. A certain percentage of the construction costs were allocated to the purchase of art. Lon Pennock and Kees Verschuren were commissioned to create an artwork. That resulted in four items, two in front, one inside and one behind the building; imaginative rolling pennies made of Weathering steel. The brown rust color is one of the characteristics of this metal alloy. Perhaps that was the reason that the new owner of the artwork in 1996 carried it away as scrap...

Furthermore, in 1977 in cooperation with the architect and painter Hubert de Boer (born 1937) and sculptor and architect Coen Wilderom (born 1944), Pennock and Verschuren developed an urban sketch design for the Bezuidenhout, a part of the Haagse Hout district in The Hague. In this district Pennock, Verschuren and light designer Crista van Santen produced a sculpture made of painted steel and neon, which was realised in 1982s.

In 1983-84 together with Lon Pennock he was recruited to develop a structure plan for art in a recreation area developed in the town of Spaarnwoude, which was implemented. In 1985 with Lon Pennock he made another sketch design for the interior space for the Maasboulevard in Maastricht, which was not implemented.

Late 1980s Verschuren also developed a concept for the public space for the municipality of The Hague; a redesign of the balloon loop area at the end of the tram line 11 in Scheveningen. The car parking possibilities in the area of the Scheveningen beach were rather chaotic, and Verschuren proposed the idea the construct parking lots in the form of impellers.

=== Dobbe eiland, 1986 ===
In 1986 Verschuren made a design for "Dobbe eiland" in Zoetermeer which was implemented. A "dobbe" is a pond dug near a town for drinking or fire water. The Dobbe eiland or Grote Dobbe in Zoetermeer had a long history. With the urban expansion of the city a new city center was built on Grote Dobbe, while the old city was on the other side of the pond. The dobbe isle was created to connect the old and new city center. A 2011 review on Verschuren's sculpture on the Dobbe eiland described :

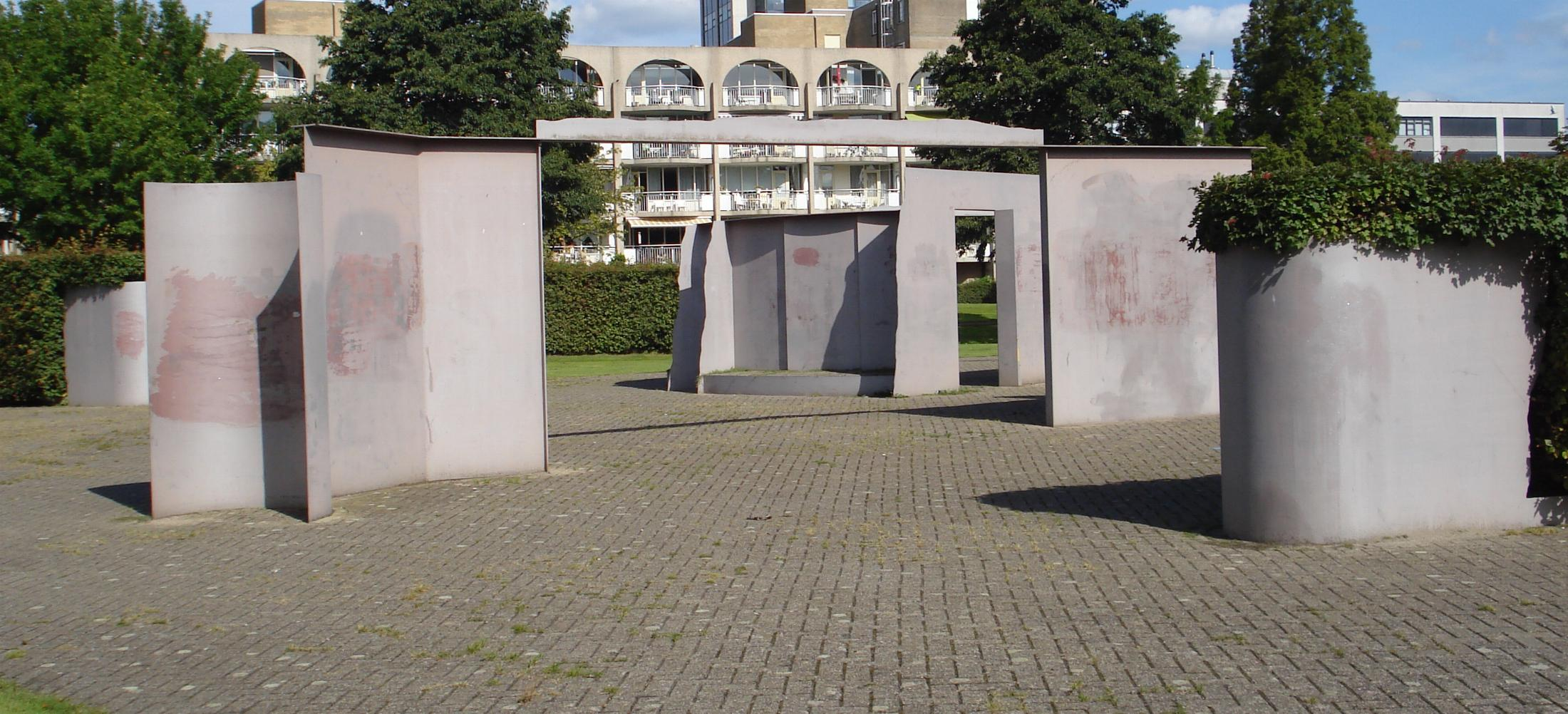
Art work "Dobbe eiland" in city center of Zoetermeer, 1986–2015.

An island as art, is a suitable characterization of the work of Kees Verschuren (1941), entitled 'Shifted'. The circular island, that lies in the Grote Dobbe lake in Zoetermeer, is decorated with iron objects and hedges which are shaped fragments of circles. When you get through one of the access bridges to the island, it provides a fascinating form game of lines, surfaces and vistas... Typical of Verschuren's sculpture is that his iron objects, mostly of steel, simply seems to have cut out, bent and folded to the inside or to the outside.

In the spring of 2015 the sculpture has been removed to make way for a new city plan to connect the old and new city center.

=== Sjatoodoo, 1989 ===
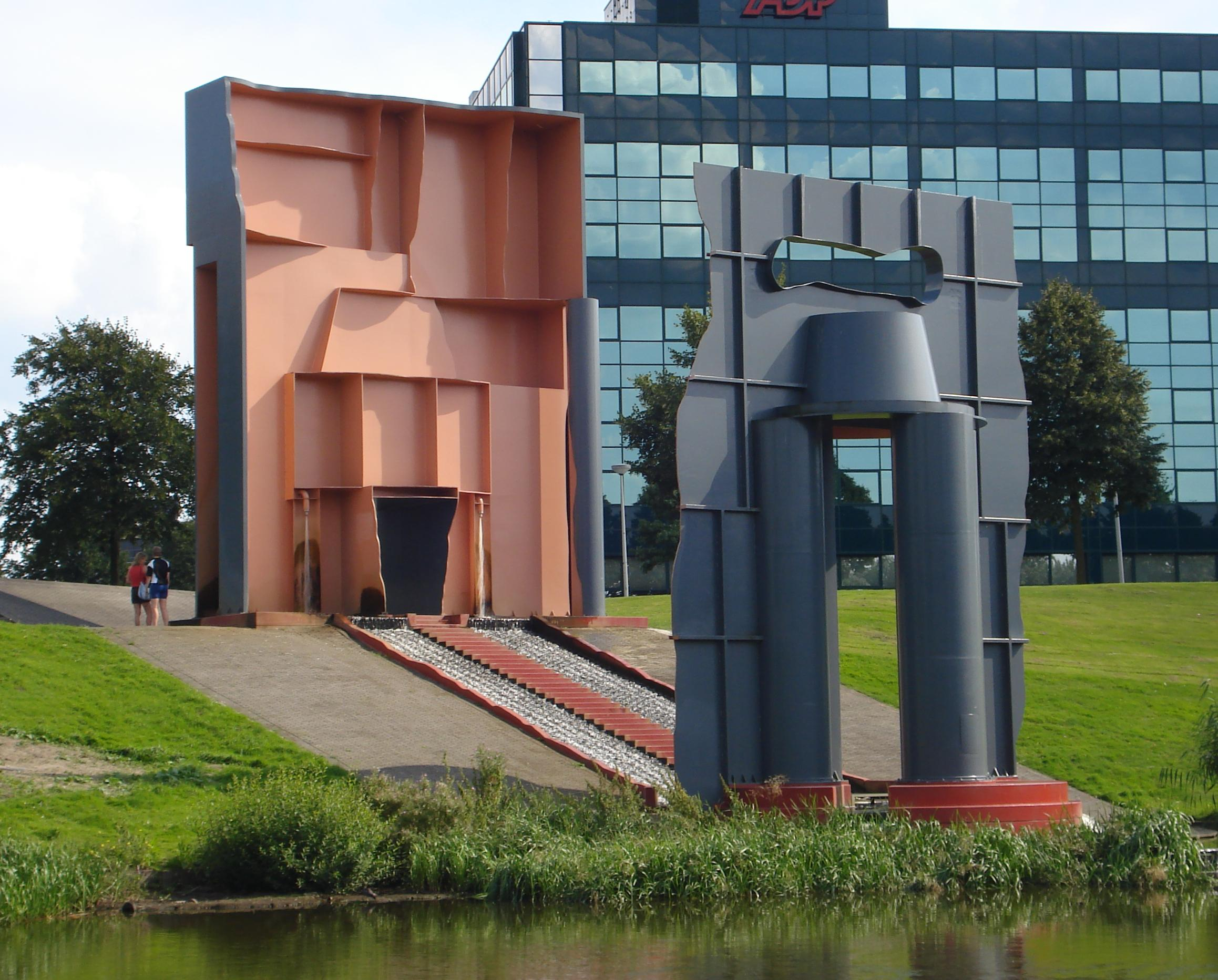
Artwork "Sjatoodoo," Rotterdam.

In 1989 in Rotterdam Verschuren realized the monumental sculpture "Sjatoodoo," Dutch pronunciation of the French Chateau d Eau. The sculpture (see image on top) visualises the reconstruction of the city of Rotterdam. The Magazine art-public (2015) described the concept of the sculpture as follows.:

... the theme [of the sculpture is] House of the Water/ House of the Bird - referring to Phoenix rising out of its ashes near the river Maas. Complexity was sought after: the work combines the arts of painting - sculpture - architecture as a visually rich cultural statement within a megalomaniac technological environment - from some distance it shows as a strong construction like so many objects in the world's largest harbour. Close by and inside the sculpture different qualities of inner-space are revealed, where the sound of 6 vertical water beams resonates within the peach-coloured steel constructions, and 20 stairs take you down - amidst rushing waters - to the lake where come to a rest and history seems to stabilize on the surface.

The sculpture is located in Rotterdam Kralingen in the Business park Brainpark near the Erasmus University Rotterdam and the Kralingse Zoom subway station.

=== Dialogue with Erasmus, 1995 ===
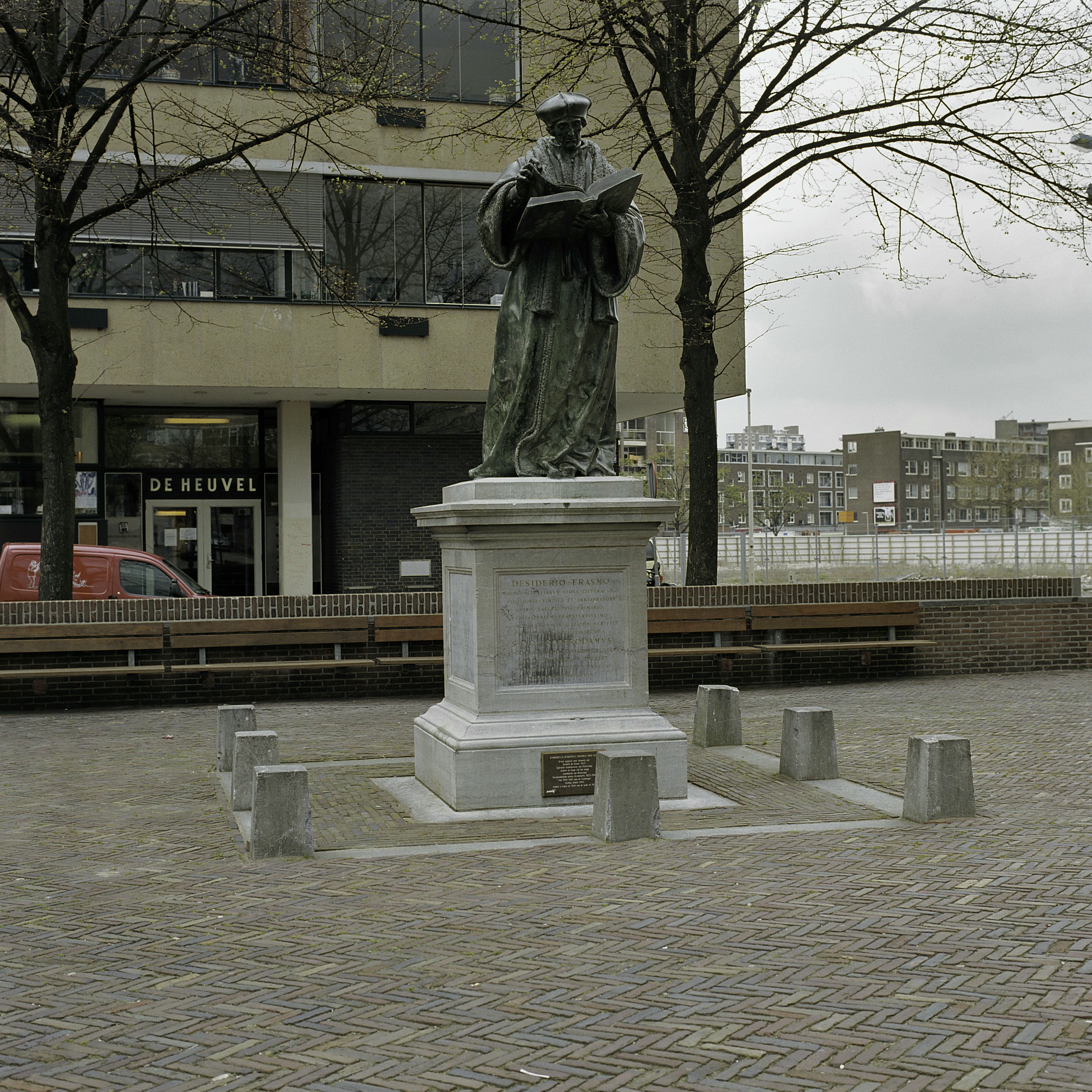
Erasmus statue in Rotterdam (without the stage).

For a 1995 sculpture route exhibition in Laurenskwartier district the city center of Rotterdam, Verschuren presented a conceptual sculpture, entitled "Dialoog met Erasmus" (Dialogue with Erasmus). He had built a stage beside the statue of Erasmus in front of the St. Lawrence Church. Als he turned around the statue itself. People could enter the stage to get into a conversation with Erasmus. Verschuren (2000) explained:

I created an intervention in the public space by turning around the image of Erasmus 90 degrees. I wanted him with his back to the Laurens church. By turning Erasmus around, I let him think out loud. I wanted to wake him, involve him in the Laurenskwartier, and not let him stare into the church all the time. It is a interaction with the history of the city, which is transformed into art. The statement is not so critical, but intended to activate. I hope.

After the exhibition the sculpture was turned back in its original position towards the church.

=== Later works ===
In the late 1990s and early in the new millennium Verschuren designed several more sculptures, such as:

- 1998, Concrete Image Group, Porporastraat, Zwolle.
- 2002, Concrete sculpture G/H/L, on roundabout in Sliedrecht.
- 2005, Sculpture entitled "De verwijzing" (2005) in the Saendelft district in Zaandijk.
- 2007, Column for human rights, Zuidpoldersingel, Spiegelmakerssingel Pijnacker.

In the atrium of the main hall of the city hall in The Hague in 2009 Verschuren presented the project "Human Rights in your kitchen too!." More recently he has turned back to painting, and the design of tapestries. In 2012 he had an exhibition of some of his monumental tapestries in the main hall of the Pulchri Studio in The Hague.

== Gallery ==
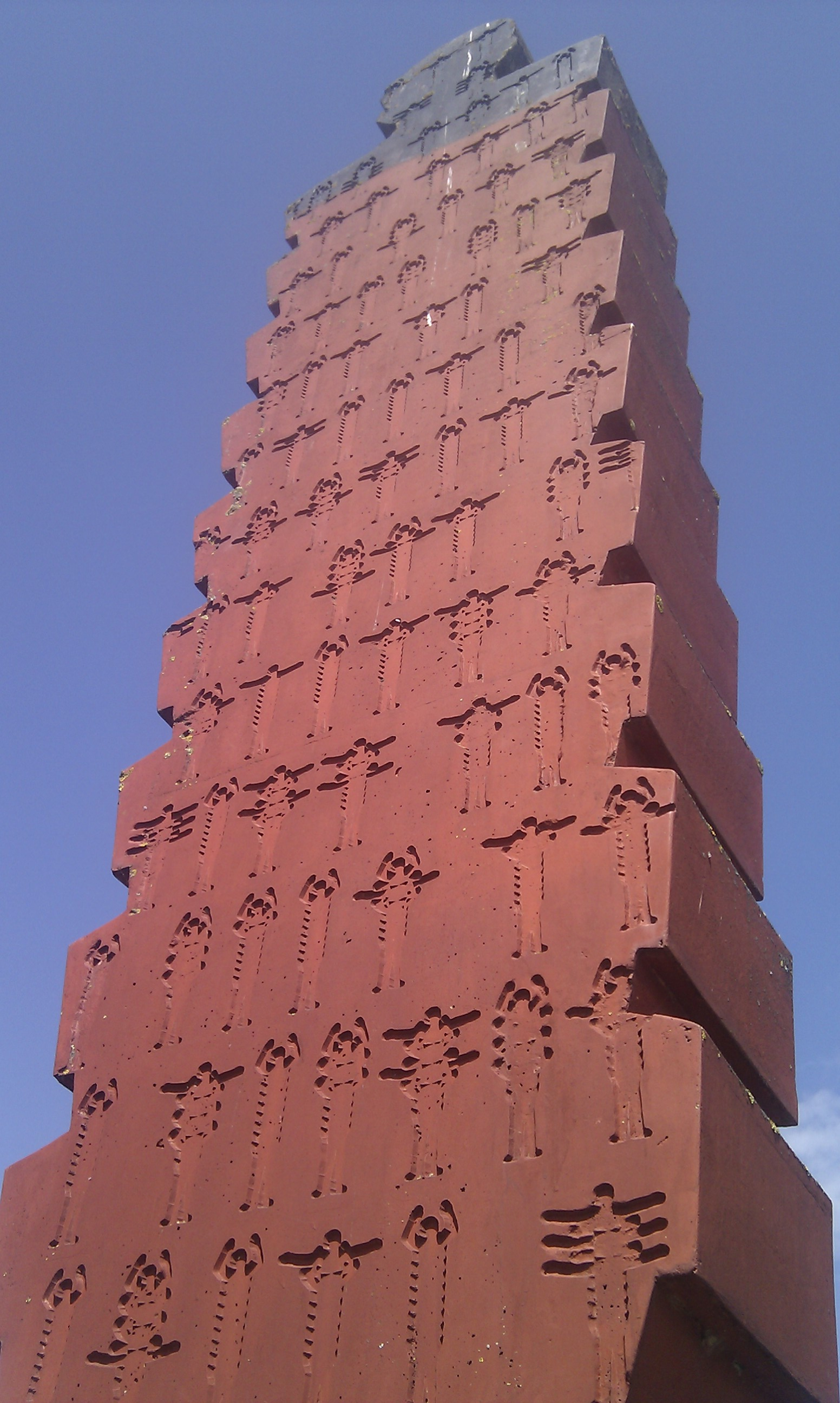
Porporastraat, Zwolle 1998

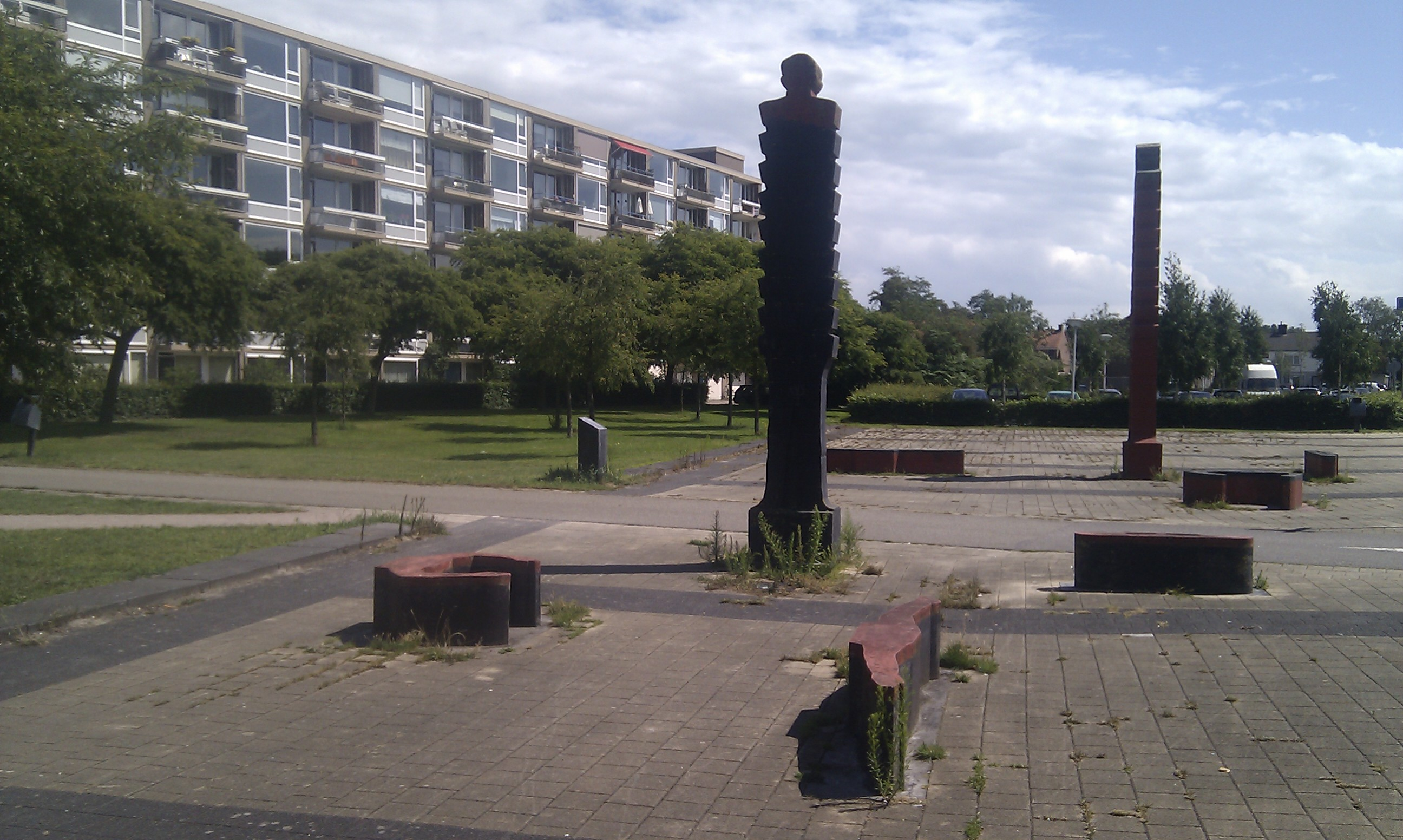
Porporastraat, Zwolle 1998

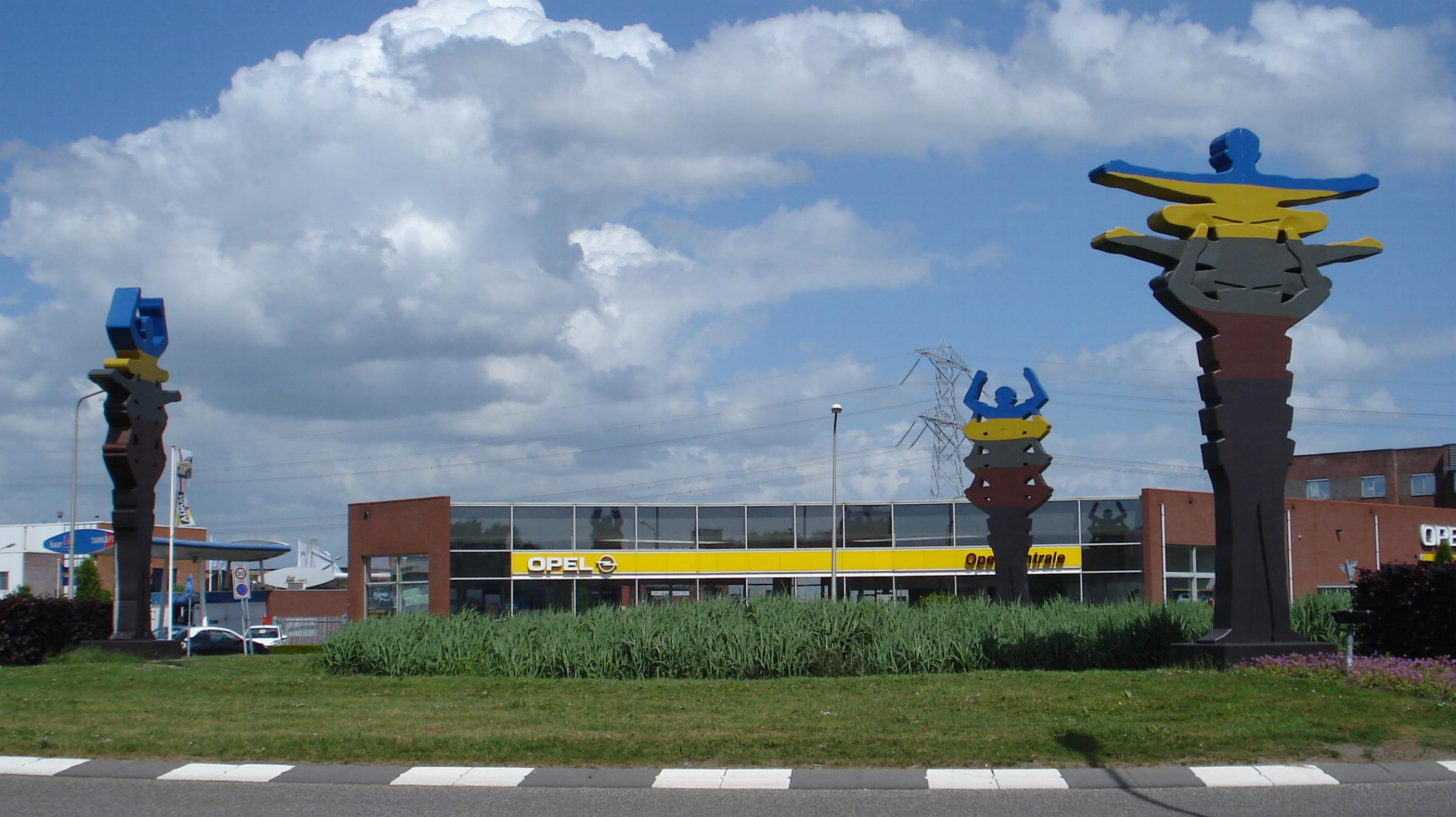
Sliedrecht, 2002

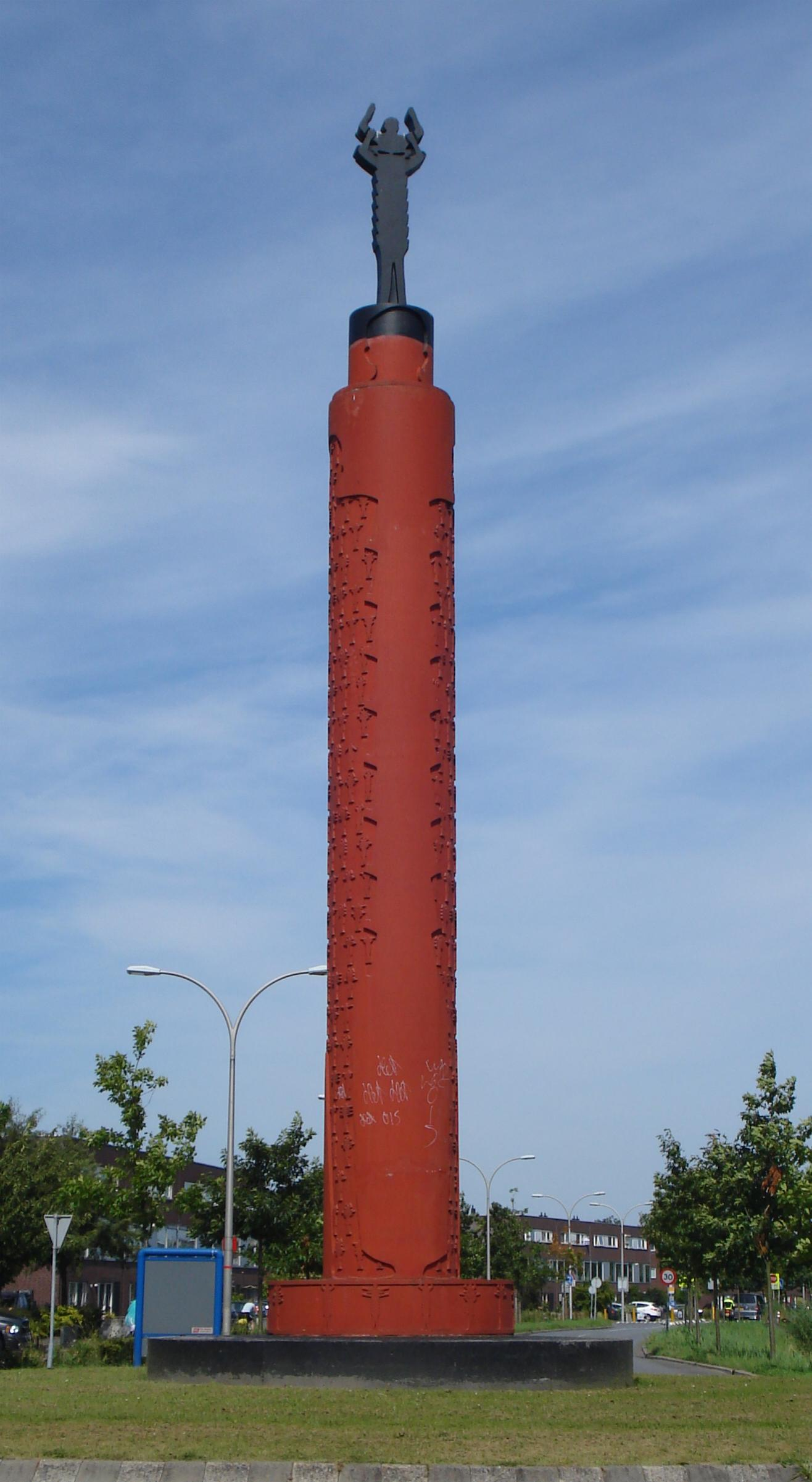
Pijnacker kunstwerk kolom van de mensenrechten, 2007

== Exhibitions, a selection ==
- 1972. Group expo with Cor van Gulik and others. Stadskantoor, Breda.
- 1972. The Hague realism with Pat Andrea, Galerie Petit, Amsterdam.
- 1973. Gallery of new realists, Dordts museum, Dordrecht.
- 1974. New Hague School with Pat Andrea, Hermanus Berserik, Peter Blokhuis, Jurjen de Haan, Cecile Hessels, Jan Kuiper, Bos Lens, Walter Nobbe, Hendri van der Putten, Lieske van der Seyp, Aat Verhoog and Kees Verschuren. Galerie De Beerenburght, Gelderland.
