= Dick Stapel =

Dutch portrait painter (born 1942)

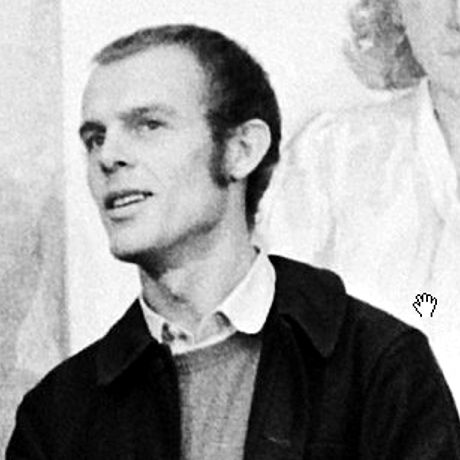
Dick Stapel, 1979

Dick Simon Stapel (born 10 August 1942) is a Dutch portrait painter known for his portraits mounted on large format, painted with a light touch.

== Life and work ==
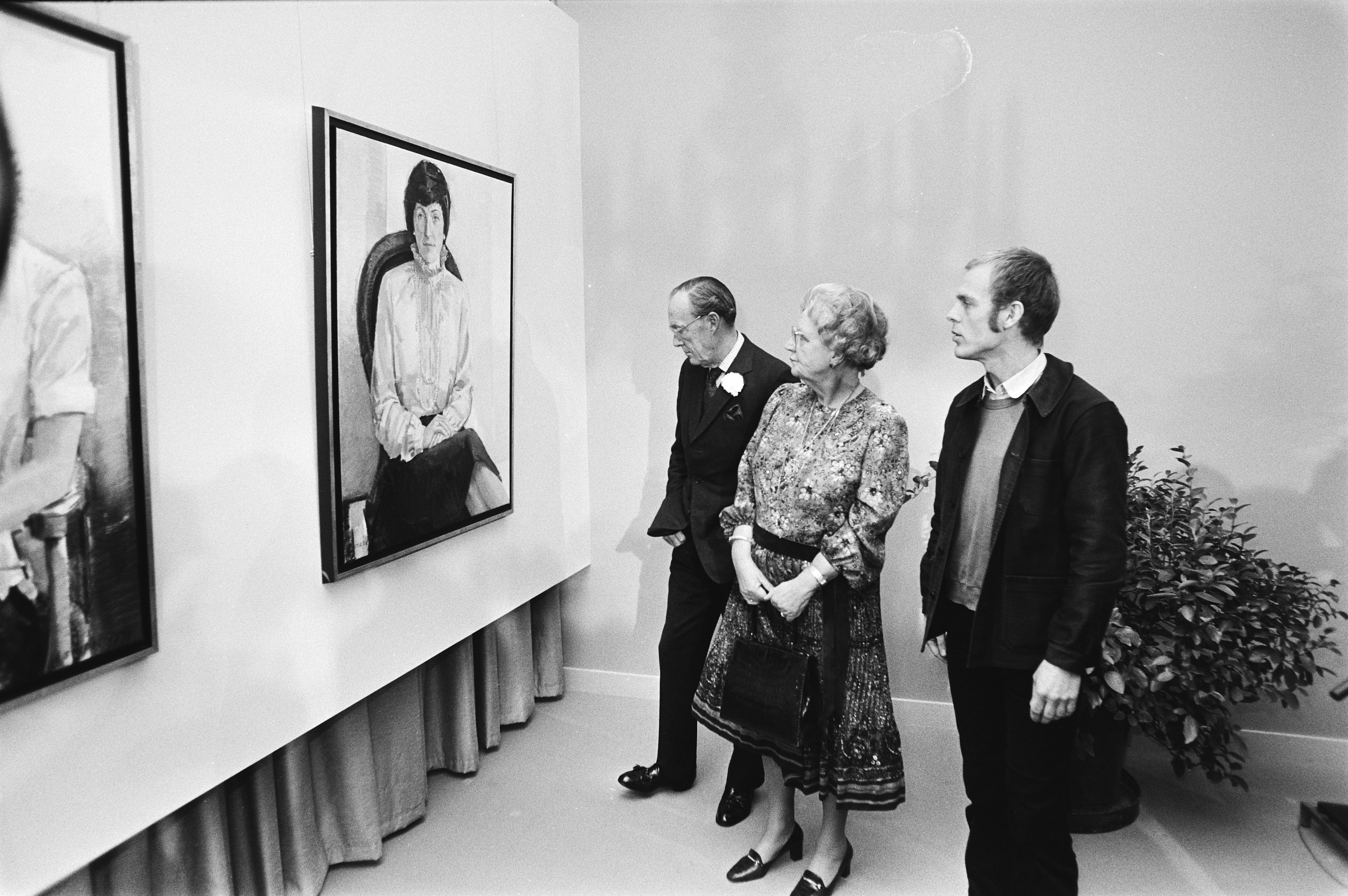
Dick Stapel & Dutch Queen Juliana look at Stapel's portrait of Princess Margriet (1979)

Dick Stapel was born in The Hague, where his father Frits Stapel (1910-1987) worked as sculptor. He graduated from the Royal Academy of Art, The Hague in 1965-66. In that year, he and Kees Verschuren were the only two students that finished the full-time program in Visual Arts.

After graduation, Stapel settled as an independent artist and became a member of the Haagse Kunstkring and of the Pulchri Studio in The Hague in 1968. In the 1970s, he became known as a portrait artist. At a 1980 exhibition at the Pulchri Studio, he surprised the audience by presenting a series of still lifes, which had actually been his first love.

In the late 1970s, he and Jan Goeting (1918-1984) were selected to create portraits of Princess Christina, Princess Beatrix, Princess Irene, and Princess Margriet. In the context of the National Gift, they were presented to Queen Juliana and Prince Bernhard in November 1979.

Over the years, among others, he portrayed: members of the royal family; business executives; politicians, ministers and mayors; and Queen's Commissioners. Also, many fellow artists were portrayed by him, as well as actors, directors and other artists from the world of performing arts. Stapel was awarded the Prix de Portrait Paul-Louis Weiller in Paris, and the Jacob Hartog Prijs in The Hague.
