= Lon Pennock =

Dutch sculptor (1945–2020)

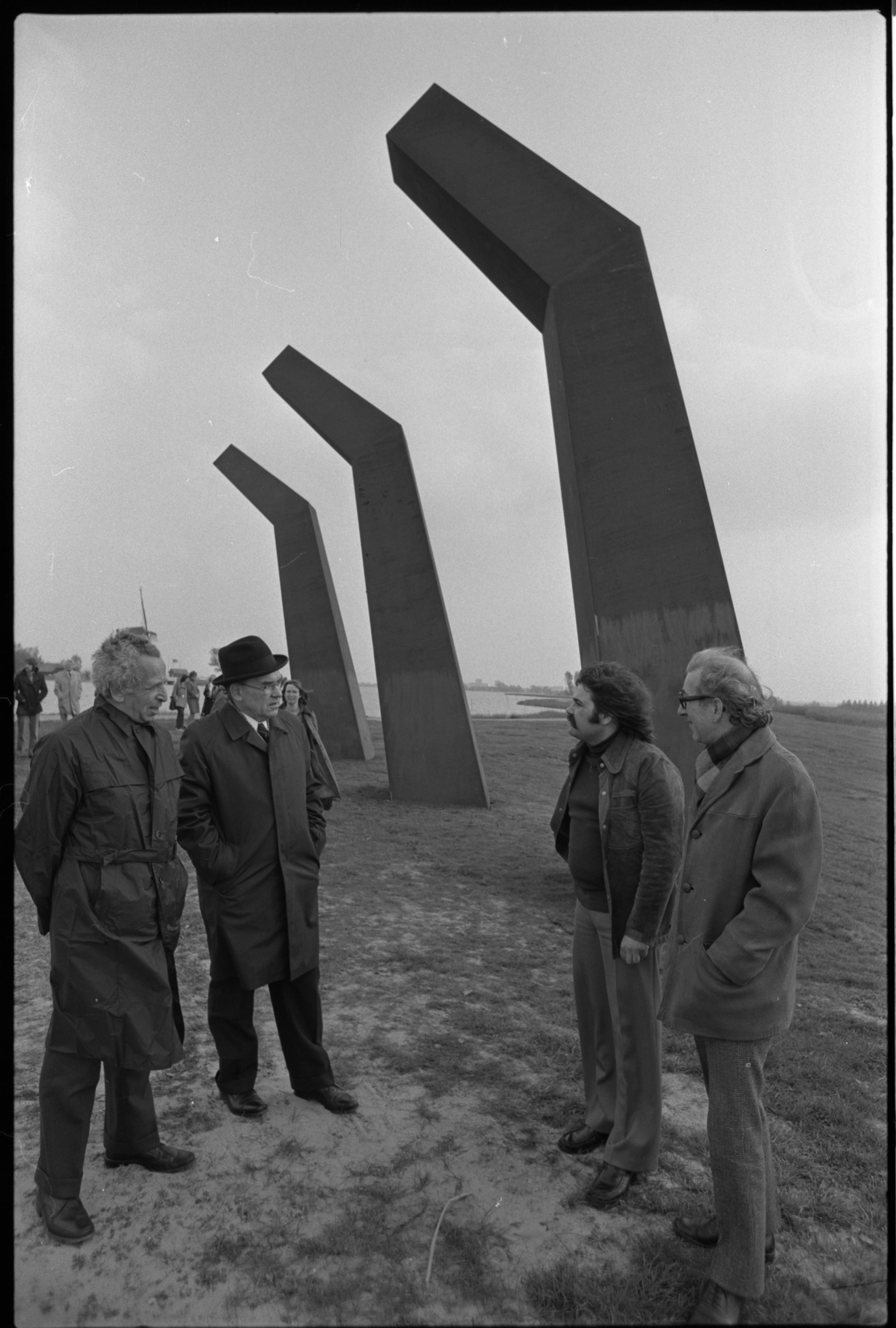
Sculpture 'Rhythm of three' revealed in 1974 with Lon Pennock, second from the right.

Leonardus Petrus Paulus "Lon" Pennock (22 May 1945, The Hague, – 9 March 2020, The Hague) was a Dutch sculptor, environmental artist, monumental artist and photographer.

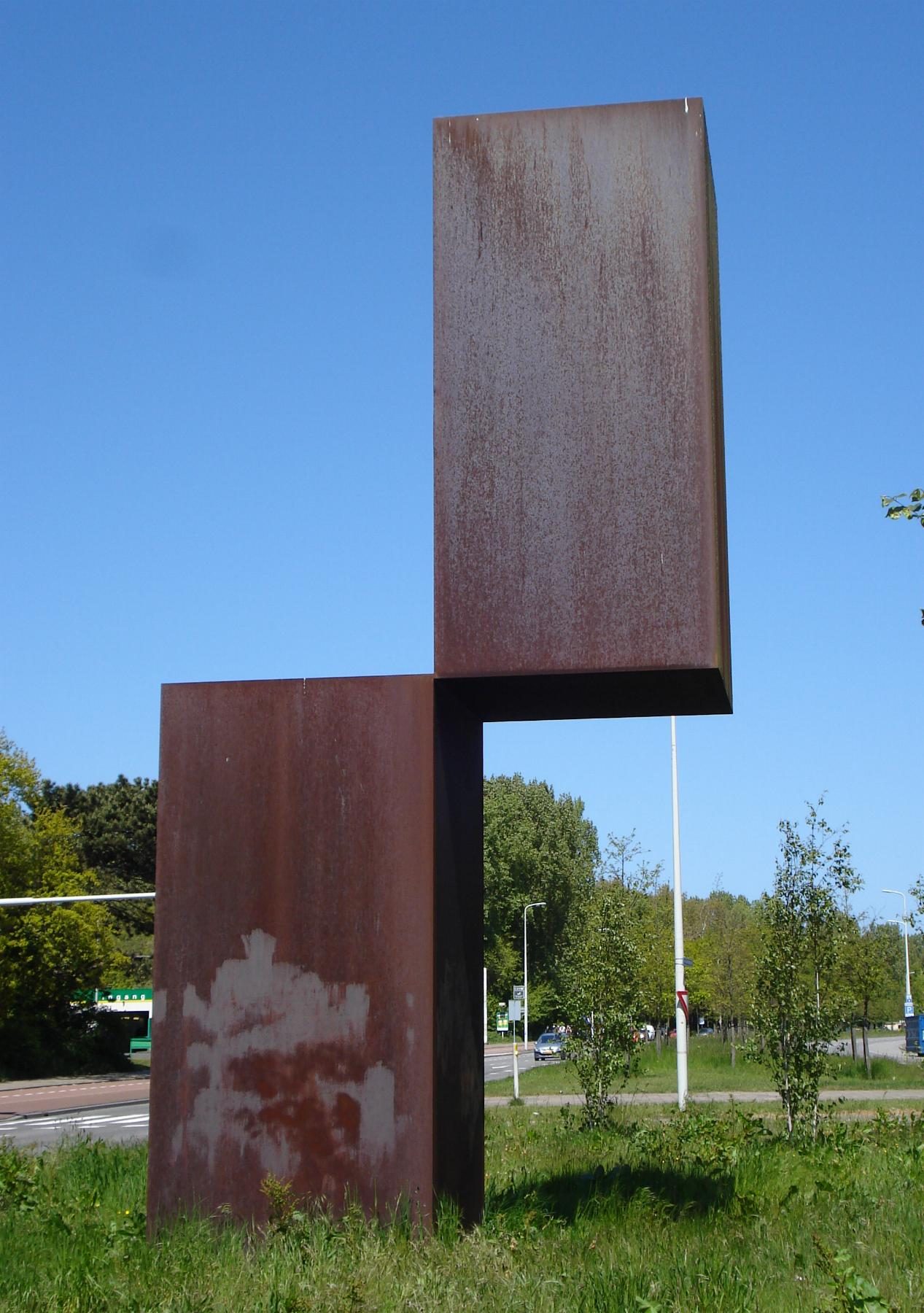
Intersection (1981), The Hague

== Life and work ==
Pennock studied sculpture at the Royal Academy of Art, The Hague from 1962 to 1967. He then continued his studies with a French scholarship to the École nationale supérieure des Beaux-Arts in Paris until 1968.

In 1969 he received both the Buys van Hulten price as the Jacob Maris incentive price. Twice he was awarded a scholarship by the Ministry of Culture, Recreation and Social Work in 1973 and in 1979. Pennock was trained as a traditional sculptor, but quickly turned into an abstract, even minimalist artist. Pennock lived and worked in The Hague, where he was born. In 1983-84 together with Kees Verschuren he developed a structure plan for art in a recreation area in the town of Spaarnwoude.

Pennock was director of the Willem de Kooning Academy in Rotterdam from 1979 to 1990. The 1984 sculpture in Rotterdam, working title The River (see image), was placed at the West Blaak not far from the front of the academy building.

== Works ==
- 1969 Fish in Zoetermeer
- 1970 Waves in Košice, Slovakia
- 1970 Untitled, Stormink Street in Deventer
- 1972 Property, Mors Avenue in The Hague
- 1973 L'homme in The Hague
- 1973 Tree, High Prins Willem in Den Haag
- 1974 Rhythm of three (Pilonen) in Bleiswijk
- 1975 Sluis in Amsterdam
- 1976 Wind Sound and surroundings, North Sea Canal at IJmuiden
- 1980 Balance of Sheets, Johan de Witt Laan / Stadhouderslaan in The Hague
- 1981 Landmark in Maarssen
- 1981 Intersection, Ockenburg in Den Haag
- 1984 untitled in Rotterdam
- 1984 untitled, hose tower fire department in Almere
- 1987 The Arch in Amsterdam
- 1987 Sheet with Frame, Sinjeur Semeynsweg in The Hague
- 1989 Untitled in Rotterdam
- 1993 Black Waves in Amsterdam
- 1996 Intersection in The Hague image route Picture Gallery P. Struycken
- 2000 Balance, Rathausvorplatz in Kaiserslautern
- 2007 Antipode, Plantation in Schiedam
- 2009 Agneta van Marken-Matthes [1], Agnetapark, Zocherweg, Delft

== Gallery ==
=== 1960-70s ===
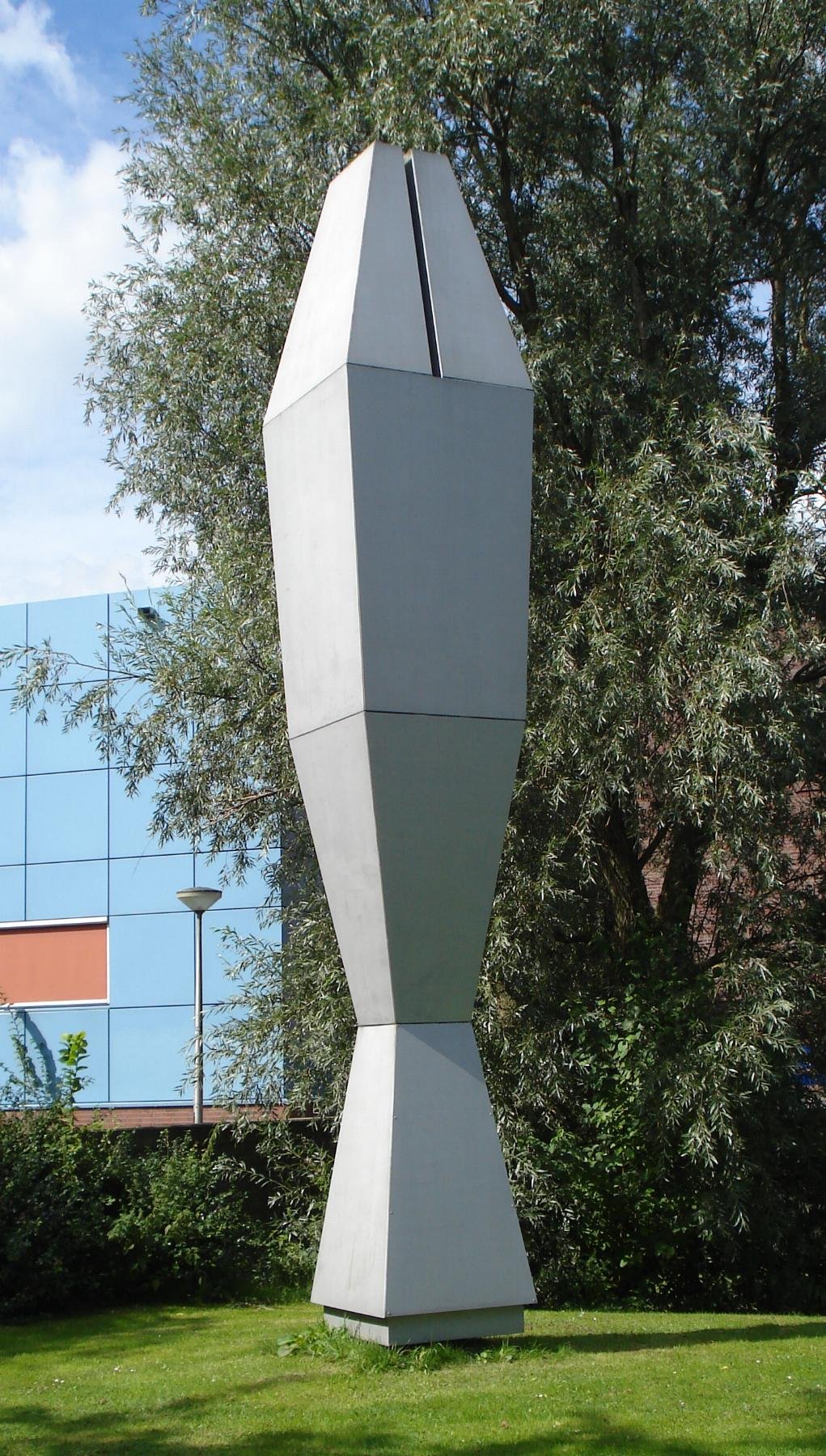
Fish (1969), Zoetermeer

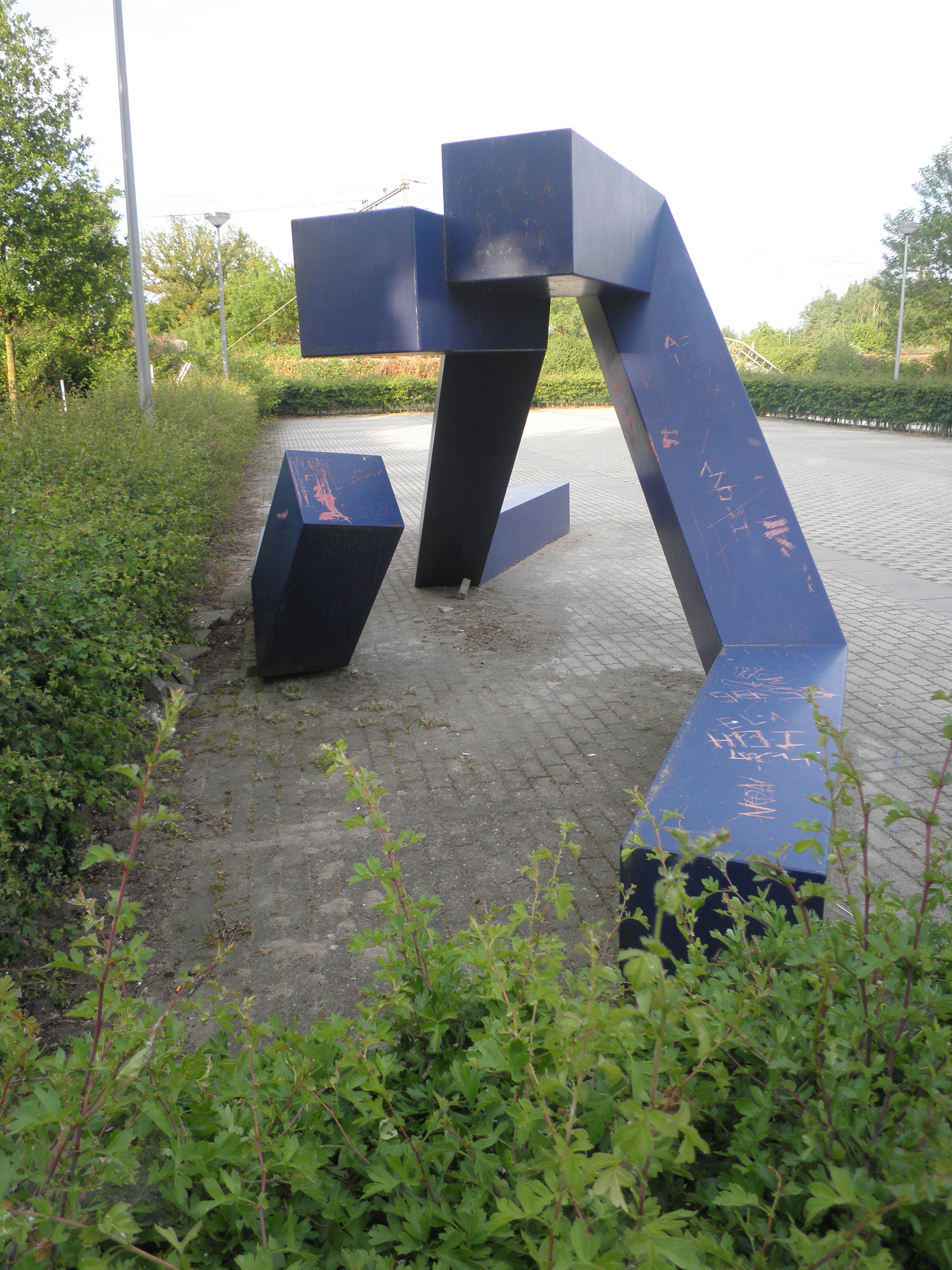
Zonder titel (1970), Deventer

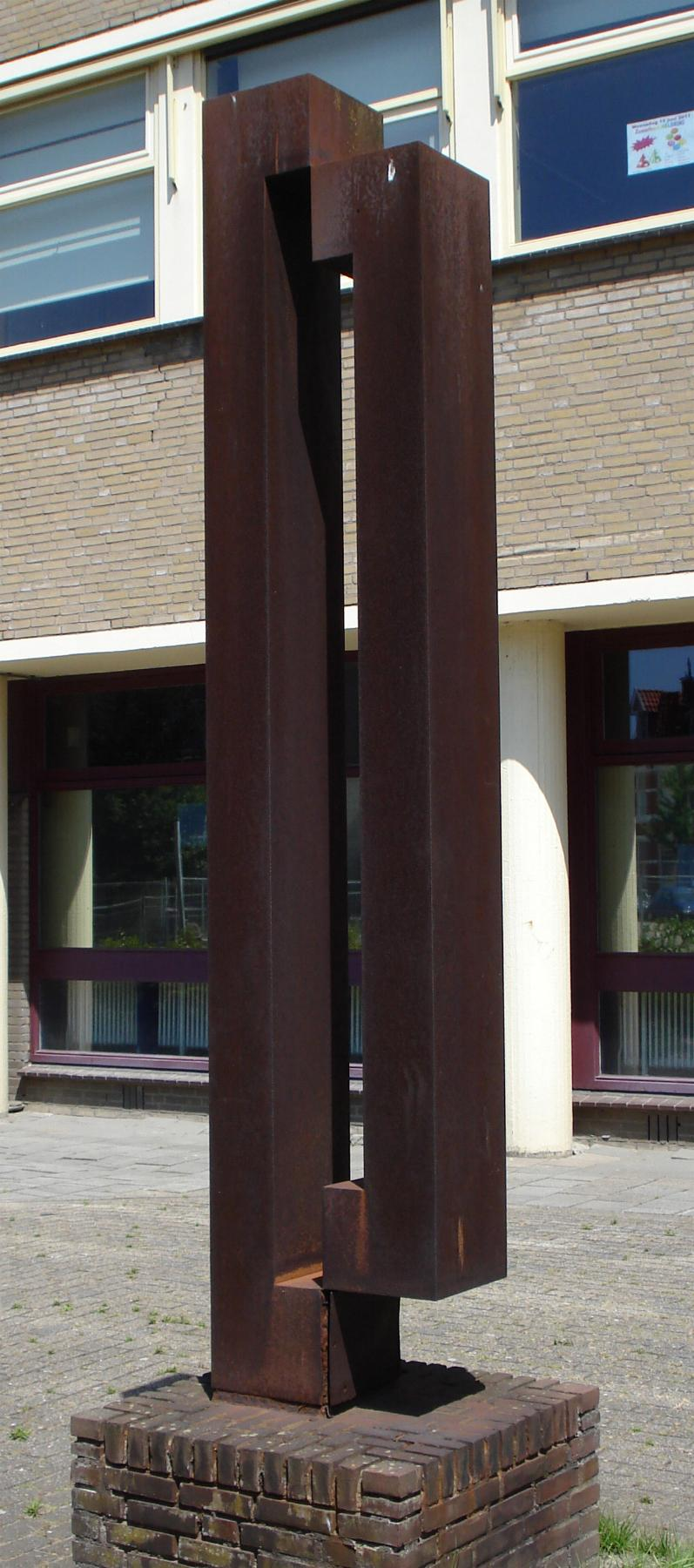
Object (1972), The Hague

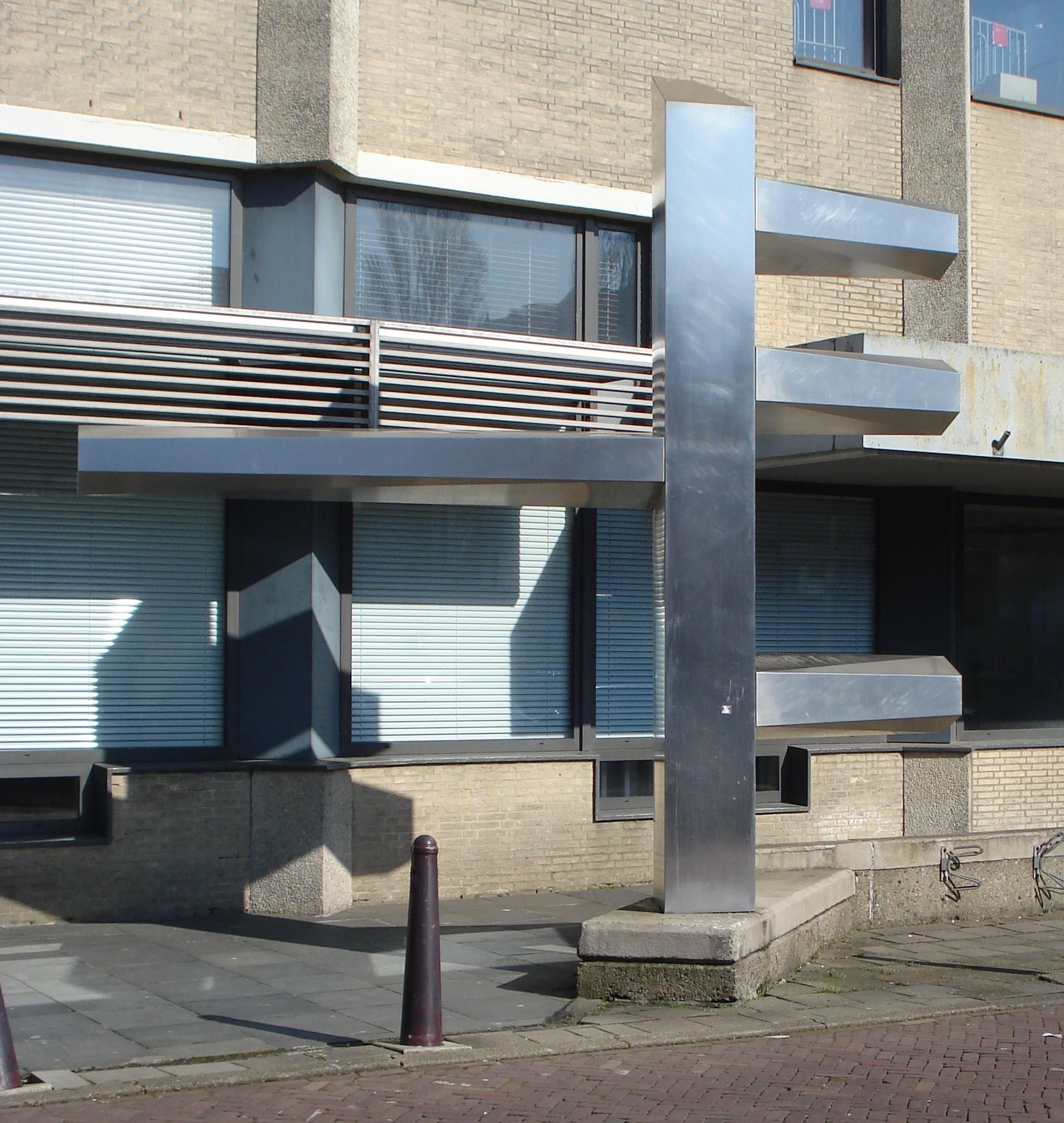
Boom (1973), The Hague

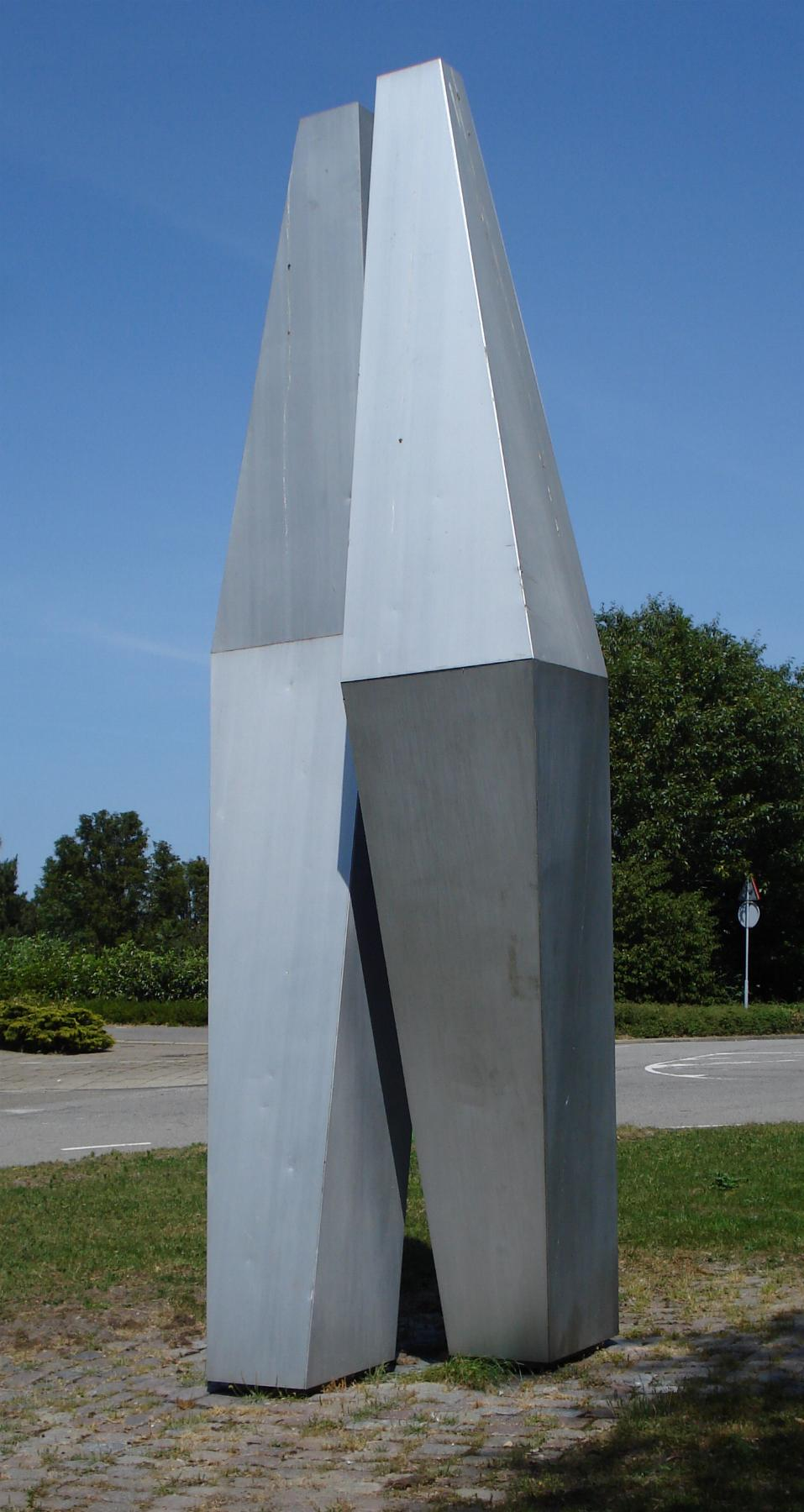
L'Homme (1973), The Hague

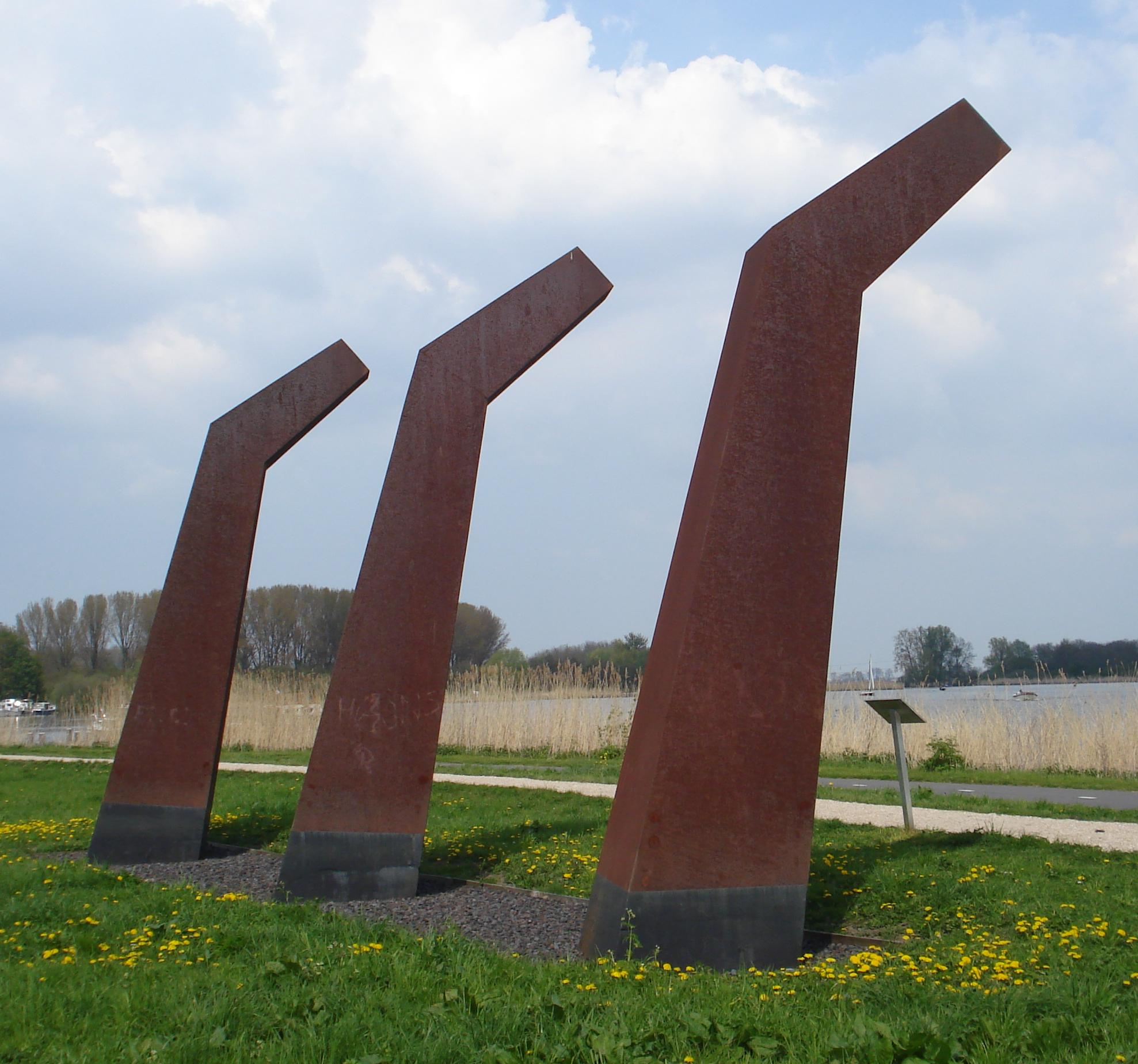
Pilonen (1974), Bleiswijk

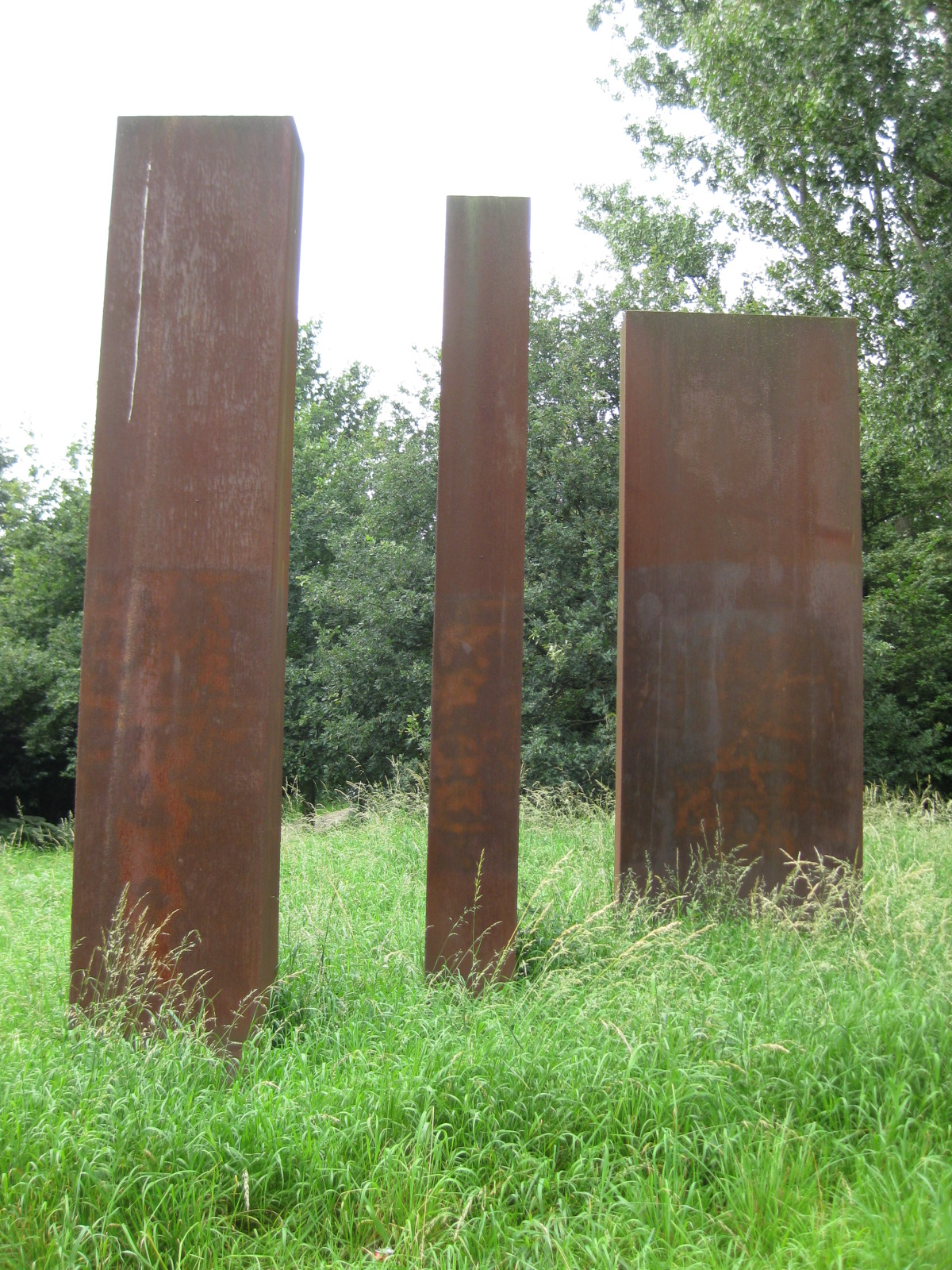
Sluis (1975), Amsterdam

=== 1980s ===
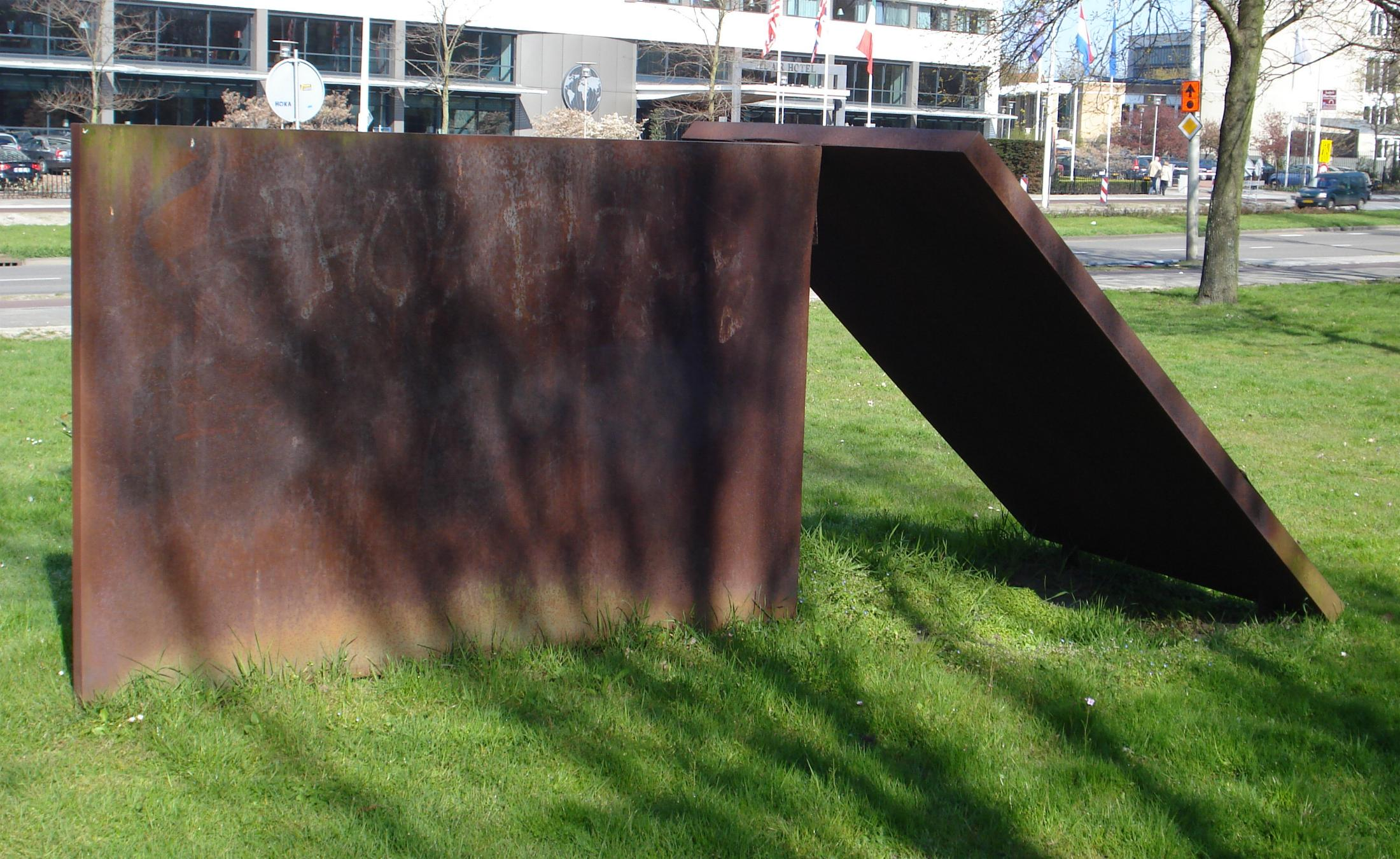
Balance of Sheets (1980), The Hague

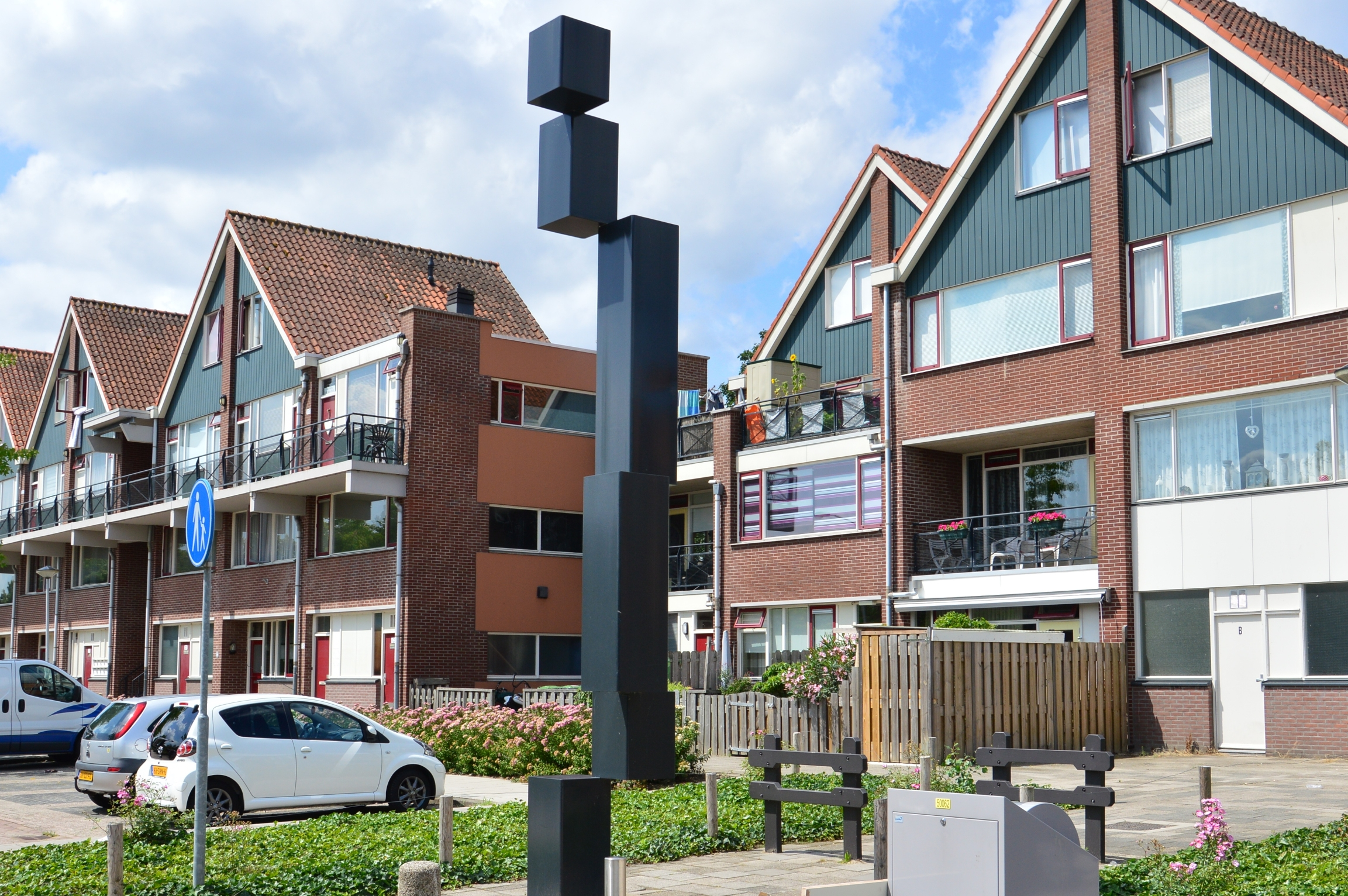
Wankel evenwicht (1970), Papendrecht

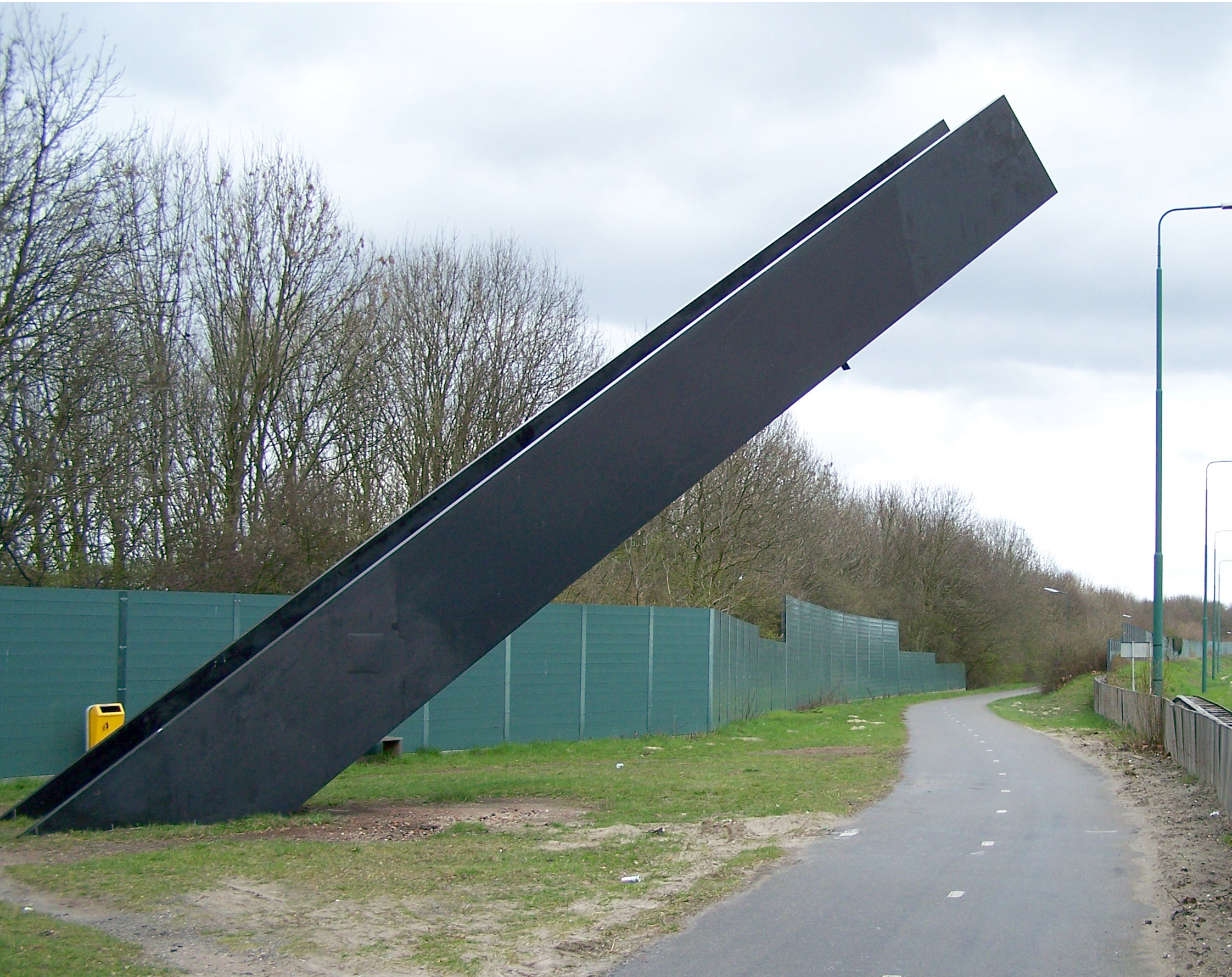
Landmark (1981), Maarssen

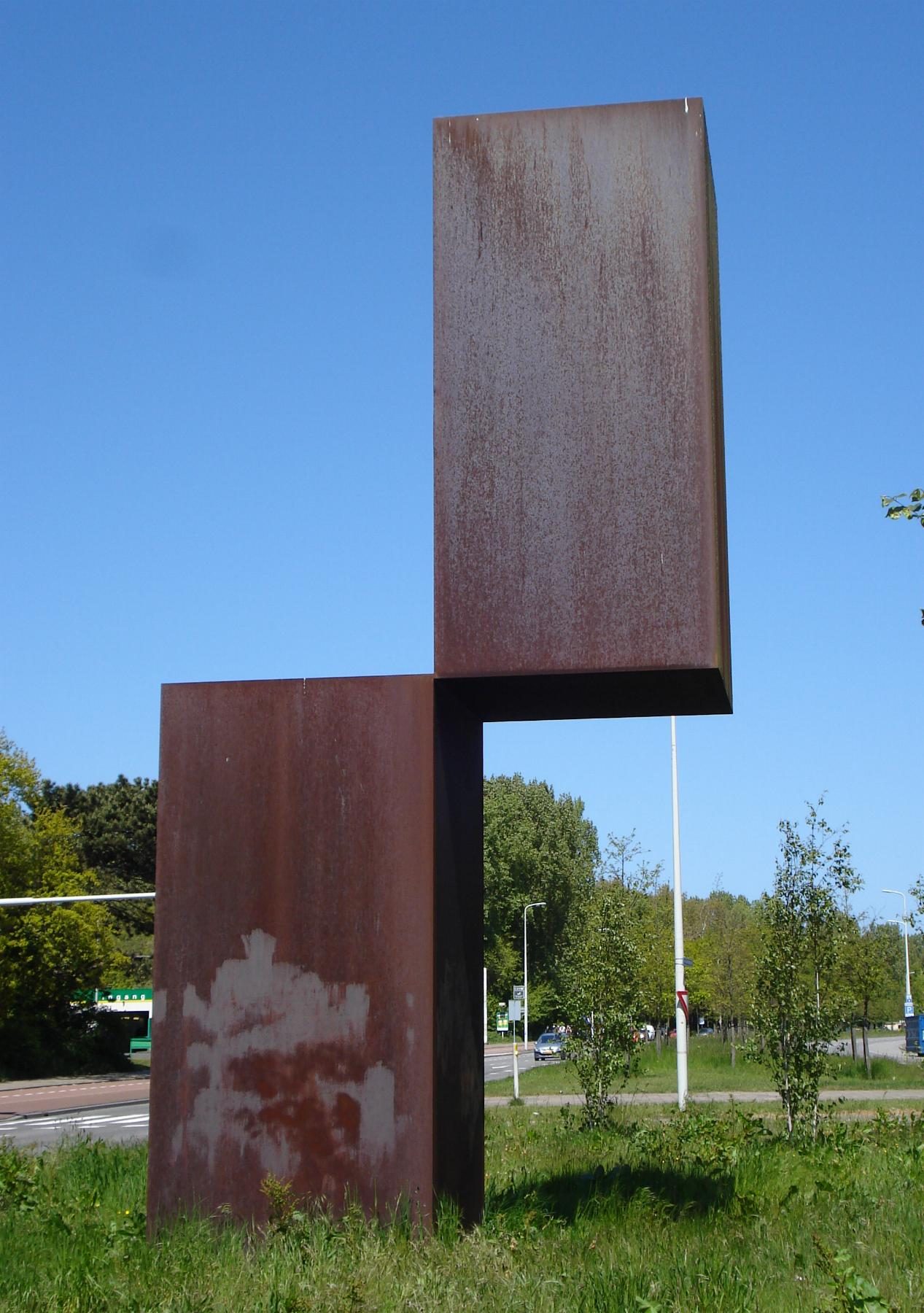
Intersection (1981), The Hague

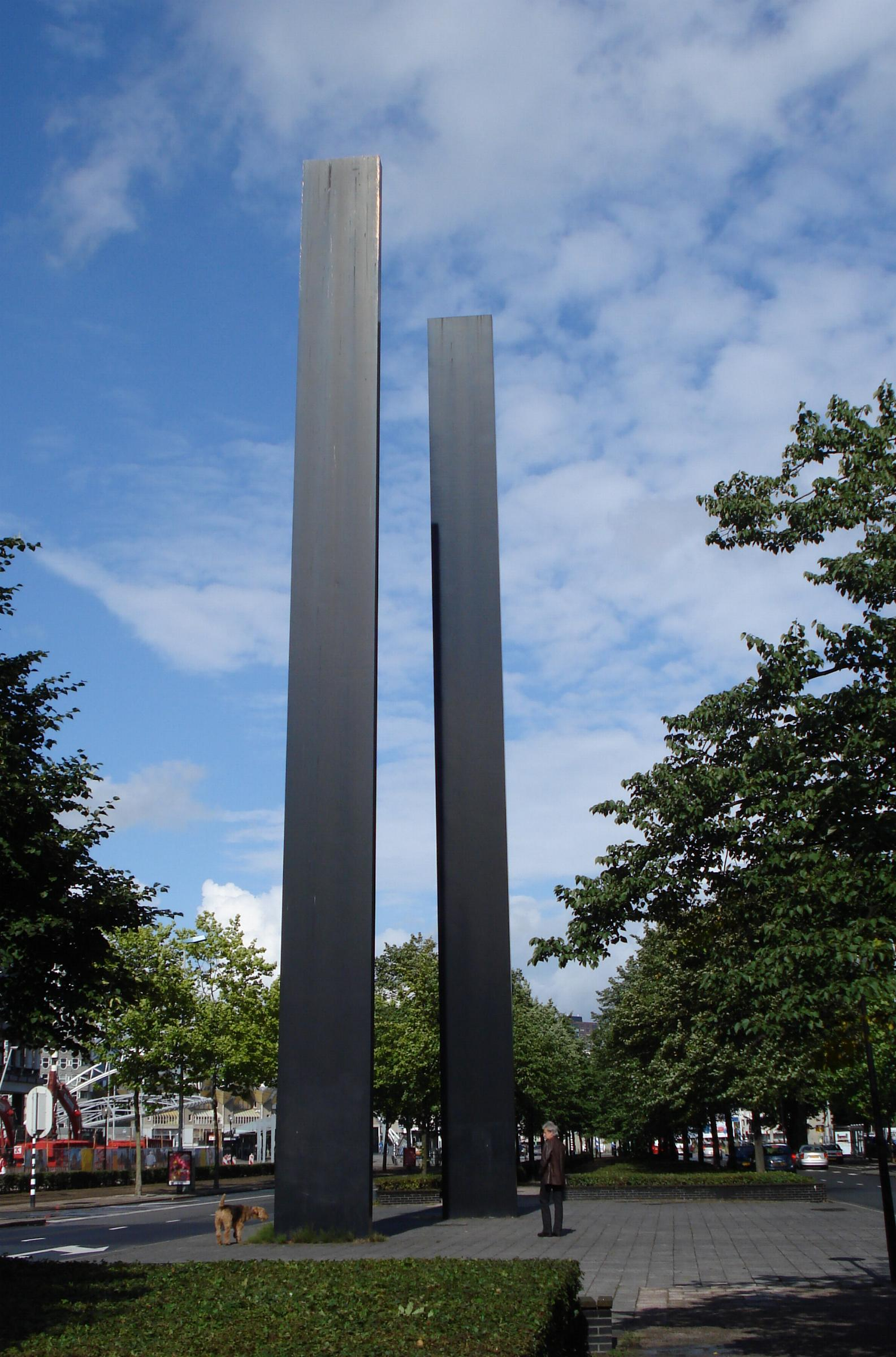
The River (1984), Rotterdam

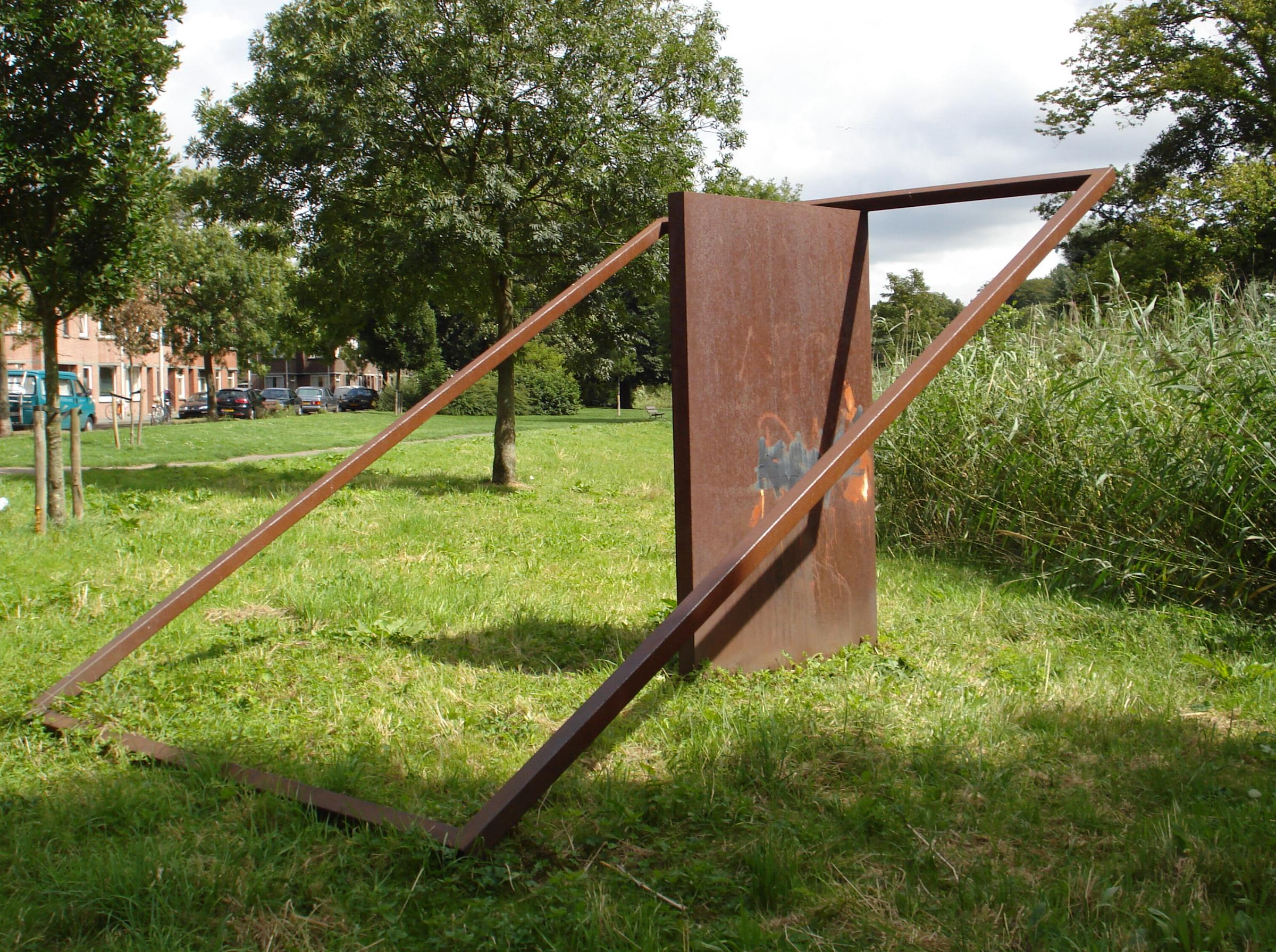
Sheet with frame, (1987), The Hague

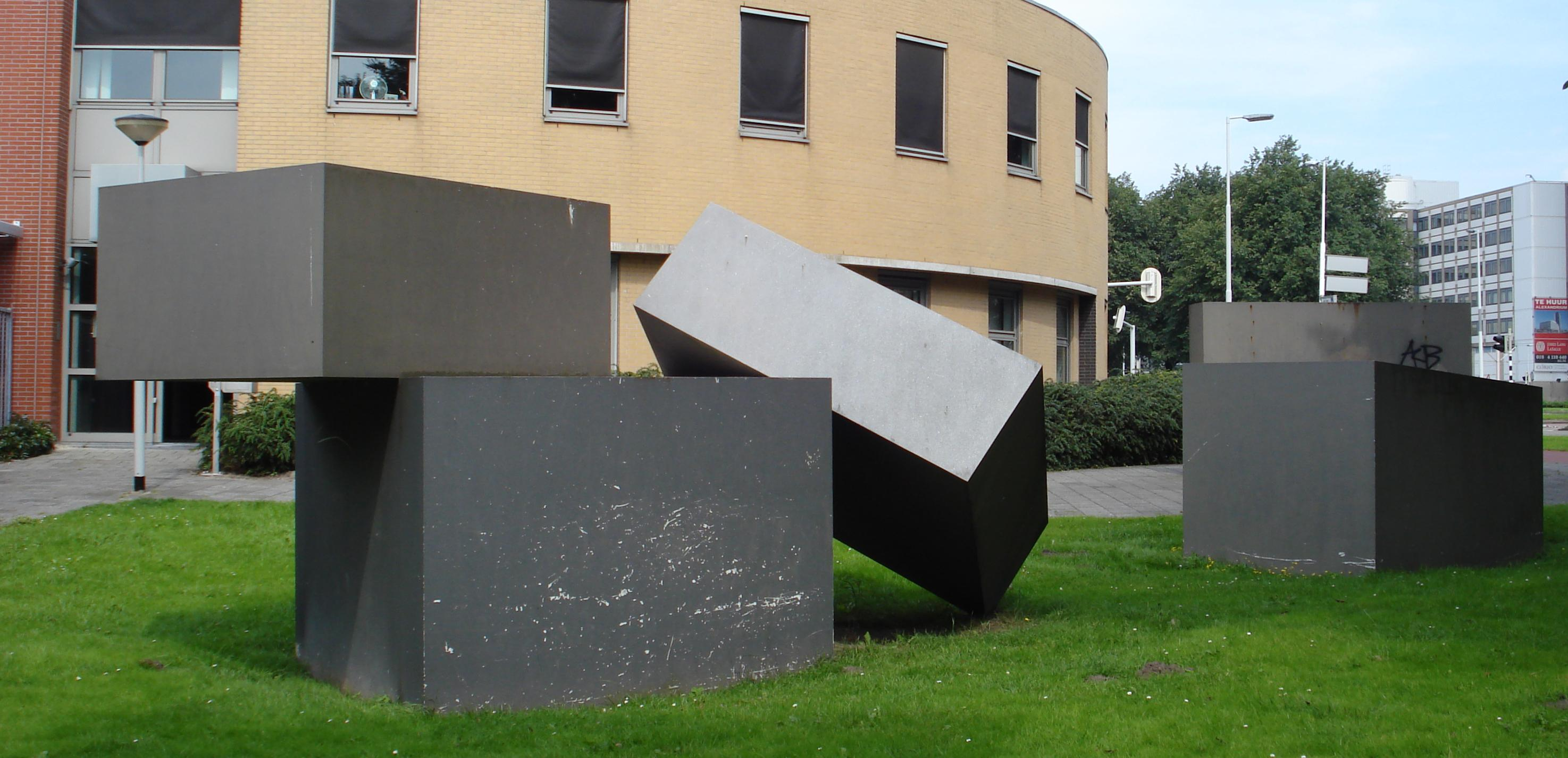
Untitled (1989), Rotterdam

=== 1990s and later on ===
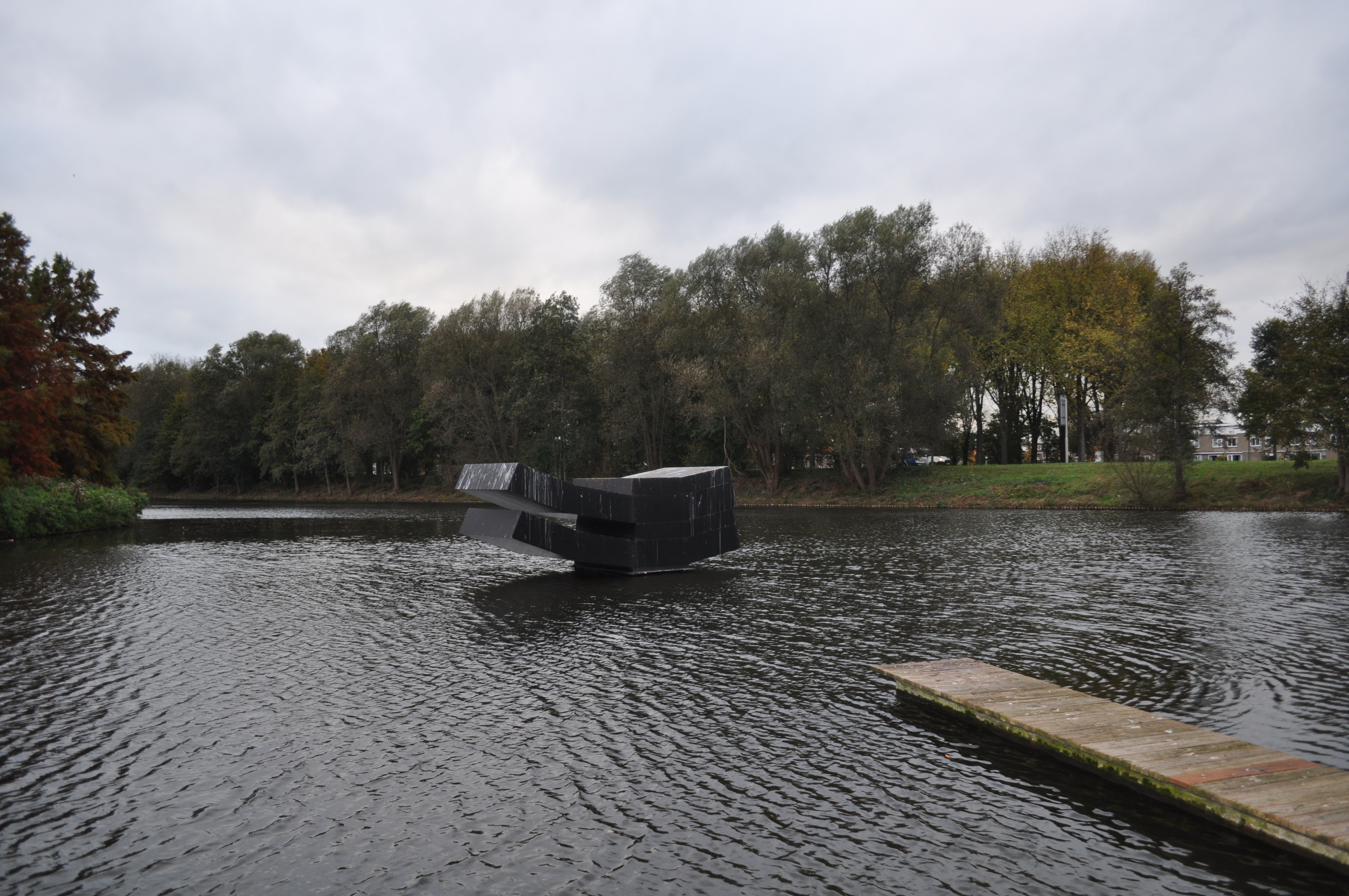
Black wave (1993/97), Amsterdam

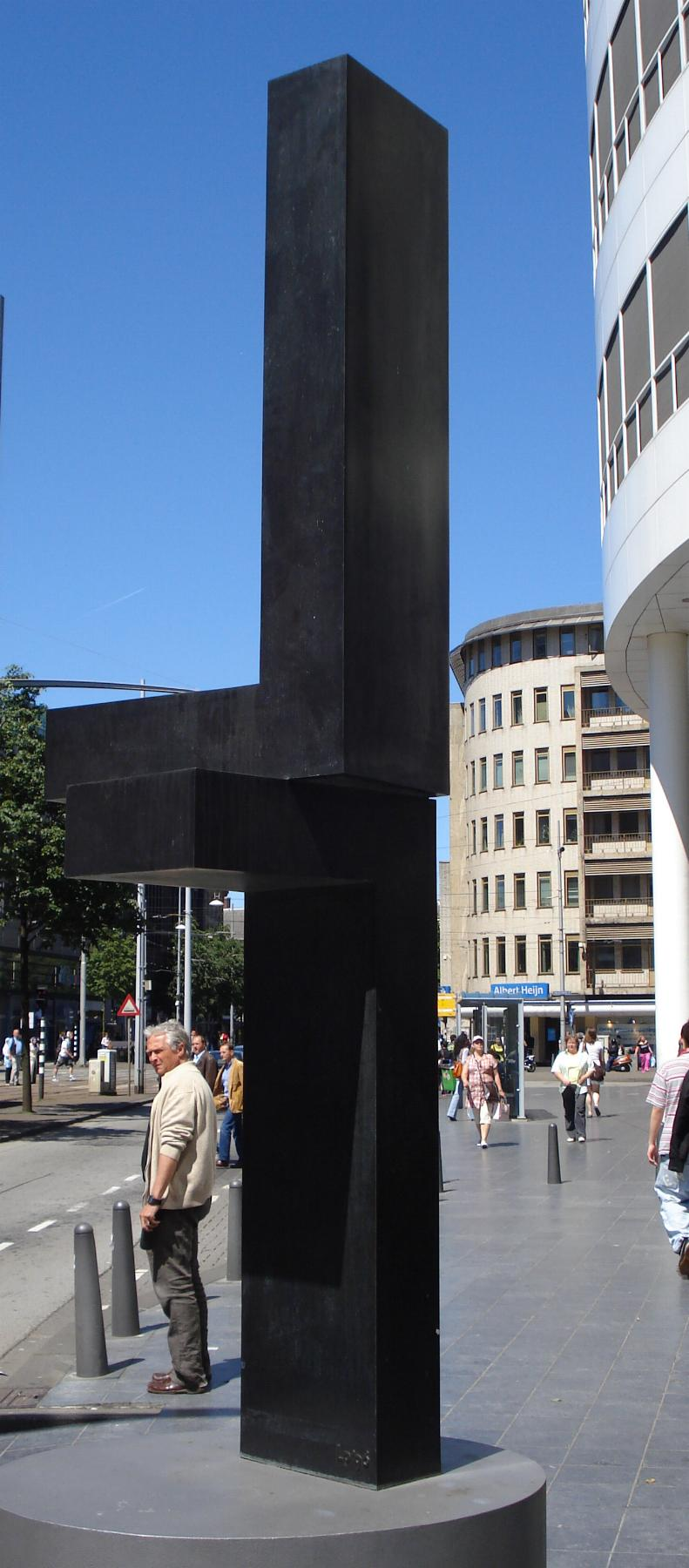
Intersection (1996), The Hague

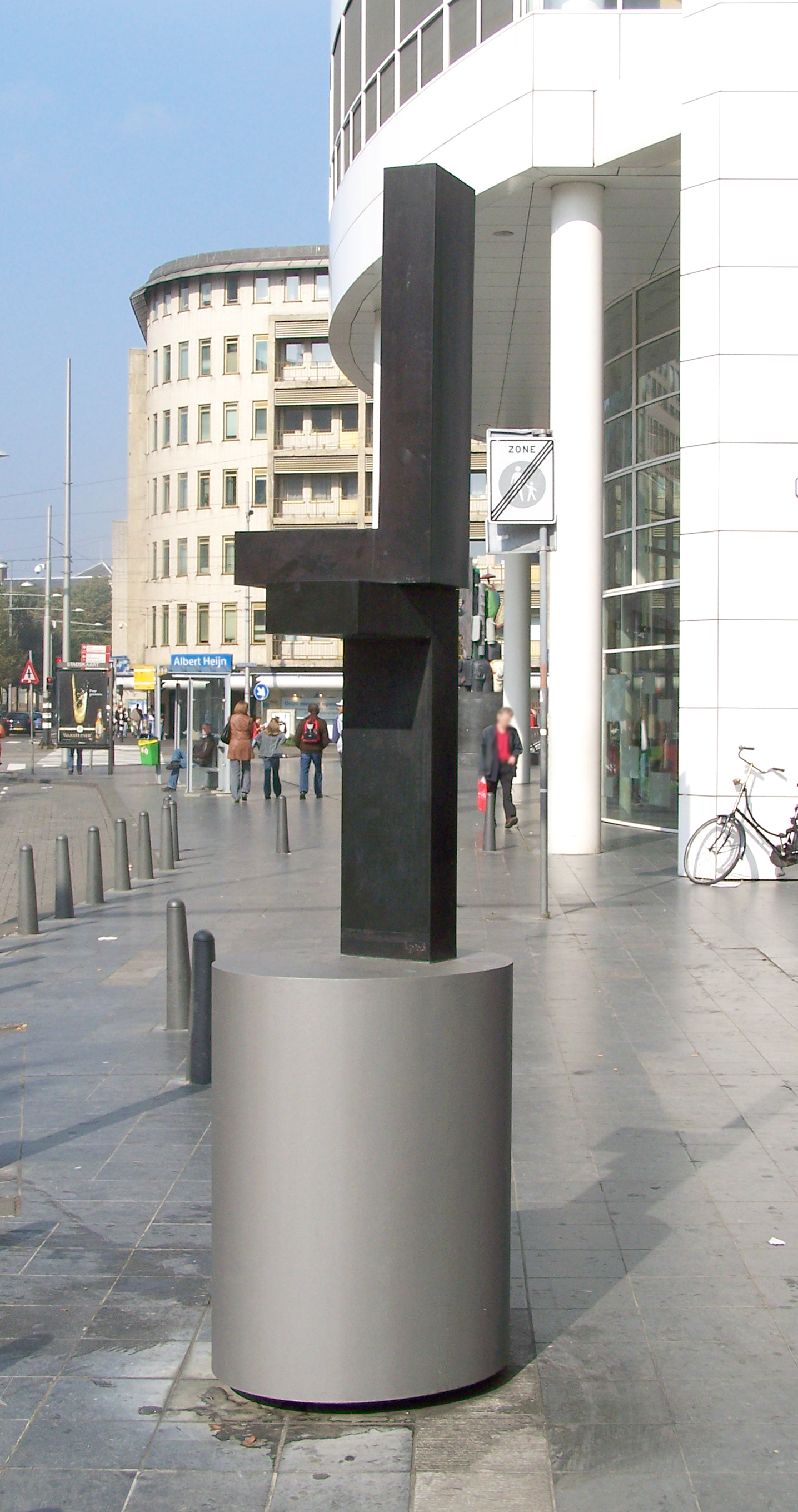
Intersection (1996), The Hague

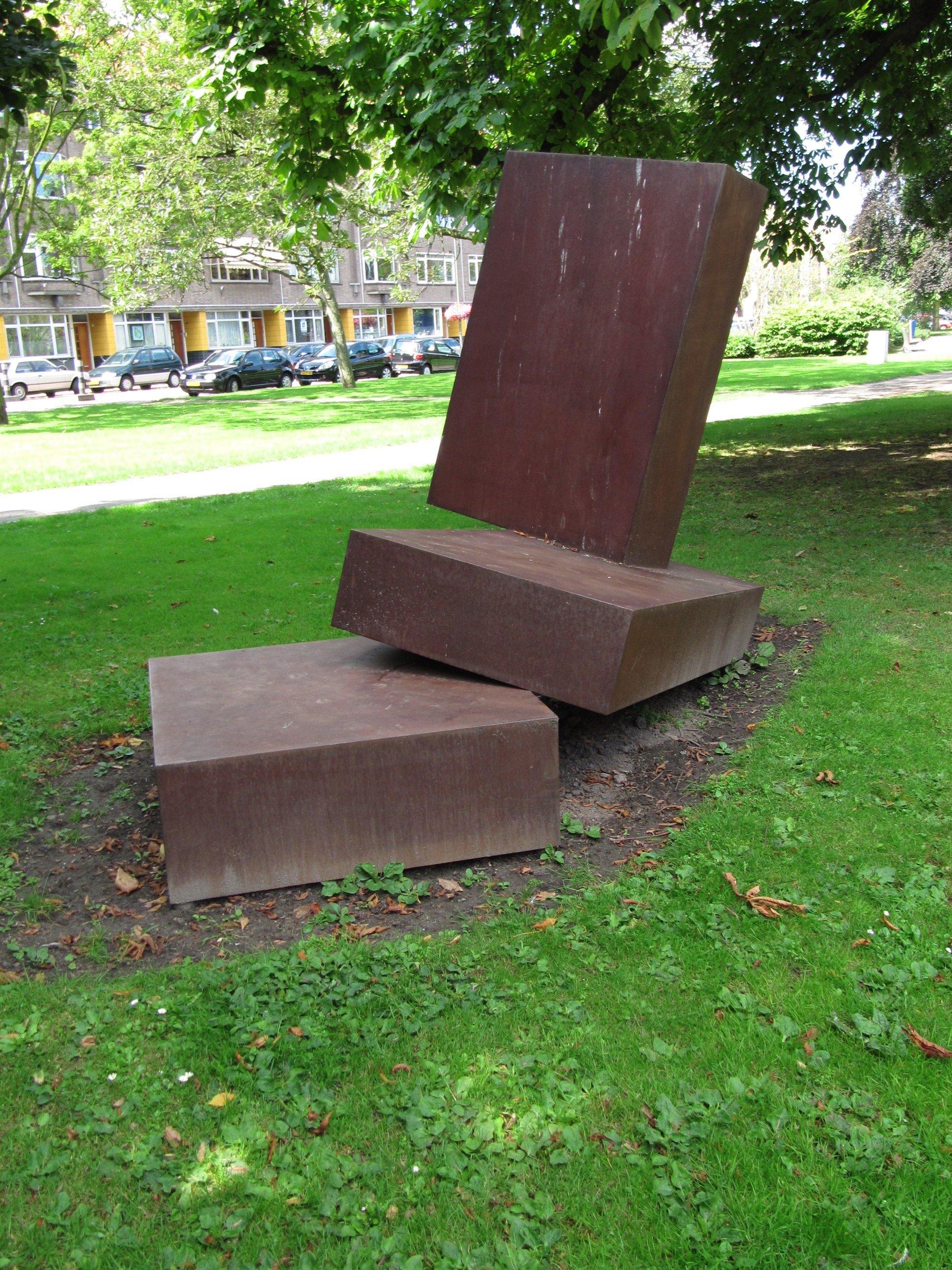
Antipode (2007), Schiedam

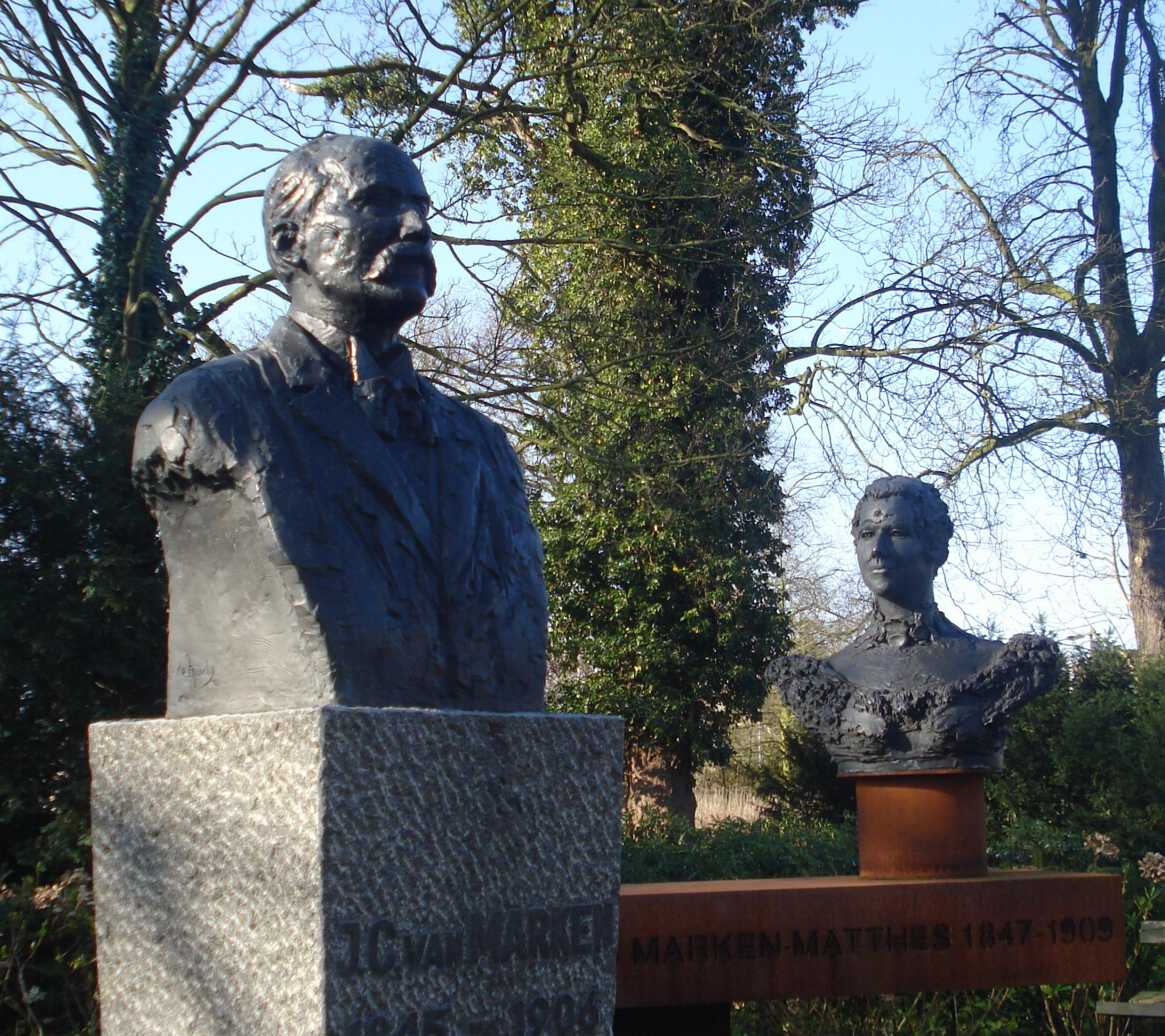
J.C. and Agneta van Marken (2009), Delft (with Pieter de Monchy)

== See also ==
- List of Dutch sculptors
