= Caland =

Caland may refer to:

== People ==
- Elisabeth Caland (born 1862), German pianist, piano pedagogue and theorist of keyboard technique
- Huguette Caland (born 1931), daughter of the first Lebanese president after independence
- Pierre Caland (born 1956), French freestyle swimmer
- Pieter Caland (1826–1902), Dutch civil engineer
- Willem Caland (1859–1952), Dutch Indologist

== Other uses ==
- Caland system, a set of rules in the reconstructed Proto-Indo-European language
- the East–West line of the Rotterdam Metro, formerly named Caland Line for Pieter Caland
- Caland Canal, Rotterdam, Netherlands - see Calandbrug, a road and former railroad bridge over the canal
- SBM Offshore, formerly IHC Caland, Dutch-based group of companies selling systems to the offshore oil and gas industry

== See also ==
- Calanda (disambiguation)
