= Schubring =

Schubring is a German surname. Notable people with the surname include:

- Harald Walter Bernhard Schubring (stage name Ted Herold, 1942–2021), German rock and roll singer
- Julius Schubring (1839–1914), German classical scholar
- Marc Schubring (born 1968), German composer
- Nicholas Saputra Schubring (born 1984), Indonesian actor and film producer
- Walther Schubring (1881–1969), German Indologist
