= F. B. J. Kuiper =

Dutch linguist (1907–2003)

- Born: Franciscus Bernardus Jacobus Kuiper; 7 July 1907; The Hague, Netherlands
- Died: 14 November 2003 (aged 96); Zeist, Netherlands
- Resting place: Rhijnhof cemetery (Leiden, Netherlands)
- Spouse(s): Eduarda Johanna de Jong (m. 1934) Hanna Nieboer (before 1982)
- Children: 5

Academic background
- Education: Leiden University
- Thesis: Die indogermanischen Nasalpräsentia: ein Versuch zu einer morphologischen Analyse (1934)
- Doctoral advisor: Frederik Muller Jzn

Academic work
- Discipline: Indo-European studies; Indology
- Institutions: Leiden University
- Doctoral students: Robert S. P. Beekes
- Notable students: J. W. de Jong
- Main interests: Sanskrit; laryngeal theory; historical Indian mythology; Munda languages
- Military career
- Allegiance: Netherlands
- Branch: Royal Netherlands Army
- Service years: c. 1928–1948
- Rank: First lieutenant
- Units: 2nd Unmounted Artillery Regiment; Motorized Artillery Regiment
- Conflicts: World War II; German invasion of the Netherlands

Franciscus Bernardus Jacobus "Frans" Kuiper (/ˈkaɪpər/ KY-pər; Dutch: [ˈkœypər]; 7 July 1907 – 14 November 2003) was a Dutch linguist and Indologist. Between 1939 and 1972, he was professor of Sanskrit at Leiden University. He served as chair of the Balto-Slavic languages, taking on the role in 1941. His research focused largely on Sanskrit, historical linguistics, and historical Indian mythology, though he contributed significantly to research of laryngeal theory and the Munda languages as well.

Kuiper's most notable contributions concerned reflexes of the nasal present in Sanskrit inherited from its Proto-Indo-European ancestor, the declension systems of Proto-Indo-European which validated an earlier theory proposed by Holger Pedersen, and the influence of Paleo-European substrates on the Indo-European languages. His analysis of vowel length in Sanskrit led to the discovery of a more widespread process now known as Kuiper's law.

Through his service in the Royal Netherlands Army's military reserve as an artillery officer, Kuiper was able to fund his graduate education. As a condition of his scholarship, he served a stint as a classics teacher at the lyceum in Batavia in the Dutch East Indies (modern-day Jakarta, Indonesia) until he was appointed to the professorship in Leiden. Kuiper served in the Netherlands' reserve component until 1948. In 1957, he co-founded the academic journal Indo-Iranian Journal with his former student J. W. de Jong and served as its editor-in-chief until 1979, though he remained a part of the editorial process until at least the 1990s. Along with Jan Gonda, Kuiper has been credited with helping improve the standing of Dutch Indology internationally. With his mentors Nicolaas van Wijk and C. C. Uhlenbeck, Kuiper has been credited with helping shape Leiden University as a premier institution for Indo-European linguistics.

== Early life ==
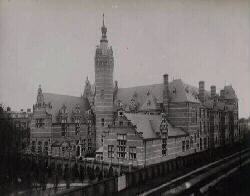
The Gymnasium Haganum in 1919, around the time Kuiper began study there

Franciscus Bernardus Jacobus Kuiper was born in The Hague on 7 July 1907, the son of Anna Maria (née van Dijck) and Franciscus Bernardus Jacobus Kuiper, a schoolteacher. During his youth, the younger Kuiper developed an interest in languages, sharing his interest with his father as early as ten years old and studying the Gothic language. Later, he attended gymnasium at the Gymnasium Haganum in his hometown, where he studied on the alpha track, a six-year program with an emphasis on languages.

After five years, he passed the alpha state examination (Dutch: staatsexamen alpha) in August 1924, beginning his studies in classical literature and Indo-European linguistics at Leiden University the same year. He further studied Sanskrit at the University of Utrecht under the tutelage of Willem Caland, taking private lessons with him at Caland's home, which covered classical Vedic works like the Brāhmaṇa and Sūtra texts.

Kuiper passed two kandidaats exams – one in classical literature in 1928 and one in Indology in 1929 – both cum laude. In the time between these exams, he joined the reserve officer corps of the Royal Netherlands Army. Kuiper served with the 2nd Unmounted Artillery Regiment, achieving the rank of vaandrig in 1931.

== Academic career ==
=== Graduate studies ===
Kuiper continued his studies in classical literature at Leiden. There, he studied under C. C. Uhlenbeck, but following Uhlenbeck's retirement, he began studying under Nicolaas van Wijk, a profound influence on Kuiper's work; following Kuiper's death, Henk Bodewitz described Van Wijk as Kuiper's "great inspirator". Kuiper studied the Balto-Slavic languages with Van Wijk, including Russian, Lithuanian, and Old Church Slavonic. In Van Wijk's posthumous Festschrift, Kuiper described the change from Uhlenbeck to Van Wijk thus:

The contrast between them could scarcely have been greater. [...] It was a big change, from the visionary romantic to the more sober, down-to-earth artisan but, particularly for a young student, it proved salutary. Van Wijk also had wide visions, as displayed in his remarkable inaugural address and his Sorbonne lectures, but they were based on patient and meticulous research.

In 1934, Kuiper completed his doctoraalexamen, which granted him the equivalent of a master's degree, in classical literature; just two weeks later, he successfully defended his dissertation, receiving his doctorate cum laude. The time between these two events was short. His doctoraal degree was funded by his military service on the condition that he teach classics at a lyceum in the Dutch colony of Batavia in the East Indies (modern-day Jakarta, Indonesia) immediately upon graduation. Kuiper consequently postponed his doctoraalexamen in order to get his doctorate before departing for the Dutch East Indies, thereby securing his thesis defense and earning both his doctoraal and his doctorate before he was forced to honor the conditions of his scholarship. He later published an expanded version of his thesis in 1937, which focused on the nasal presents – that is, the infixation of the nasal consonant *n to form some present tense verbs – in Sanskrit and other Indo-European languages.

=== Life abroad and return to Leiden ===
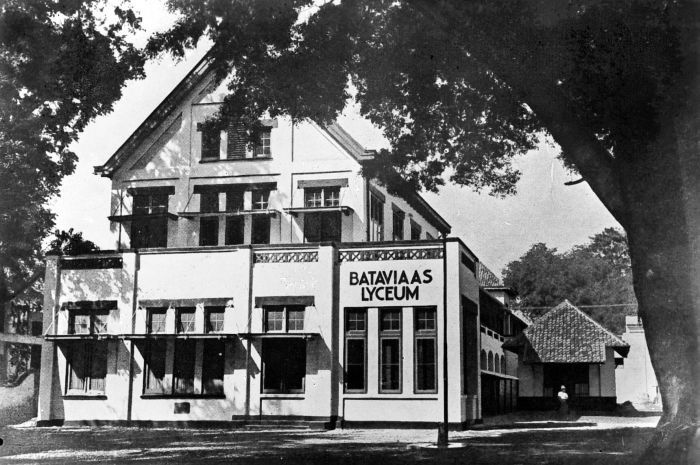
Kuiper taught at the lyceum in Batavia, Dutch East Indies, as a condition of his military scholarship.

Shortly before departing to Batavia, Kuiper married Eduarda Johanna "Warda" de Jong in 1934. Once there, he taught classics at the Carpentier Alting Foundation Lyceum (Dutch: Lyceum der Carpentier Alting–Stichting). During his time abroad, he continued his research and published several articles. He remained in military service as a reservist, being promoted to second lieutenant in February 1935 followed by a promotion to first lieutenant in December as a part of the Motorized Artillery Regiment. In 1937, he became a member of the Royal Netherlands Academy of Arts and Sciences. In April 1939, Kuiper resigned his membership. In the fall of the same year, Kuiper was appointed by Leiden University to take over the Sanskrit professorship after J. Ph. Vogel's departure, taking the official title of "Regular Professor of Sanskrit and Its Literature and Indian Archeology" (gewoon hoogleeraar in het Sanskriet en zijn letterkunde en de Indische Oudheidkunde). He gave an inaugural speech shortly after his arrival, entitled "De goddelijke moeder in de voor-indische religie" ('The Divine Mother in the Pre-Indian Religion'). In 1940, he was honorably discharged from military service as a first lieutenant.

Due to the threat of Nazi Germany at the time, Kuiper returned to military service and taught only once a week, but following the defeat of the Netherlands and its subsequent occupation, the university was shut down. Around this time, Van Wijk and he were close friends. When Van Wijk died unexpectedly in 1941, Kuiper was selected as one of the only two to speak at the packed funeral and had a significant role in handling his estate. Throughout his career, Kuiper kept a portrait of Van Wijk on his desk. Following Van Wijk's death, Kuiper was appointed to take over as chair of the Balto-Slavic languages. In 1942, Kuiper published one of his most influential pieces: "Notes on Vedic Noun-Inflexion". The piece argues for a system of two accent-based inflection systems in Proto-Indo-European, based on his previous publication La cinquième déclinaison latine ('The Latin Fifth Declension') and the earlier work of the Danish linguist Holger Pedersen. The article was well-received and was quickly accepted by fellow linguists.

=== Post-war career ===
Kuiper resumed teaching during the 1945–1946 academic year. During the occupation, he had spent most of his study on the Munda languages, culminating in an English-language book – Proto-Munda Words in Sanskrit – published in 1948 which he later described as "immature". The same year, he was again honorably discharged from military service and was re-inducted into the Royal Netherlands Academy of Arts and Sciences. During this period, Kuiper began teaching comparative Indo-European linguistics, as well as Old Iranian and Tamil, and took an academic interest in laryngeal theory. This theory – which proposed that the Proto-Indo-European language had three consonants of indeterminate guttural places of articulation which typically developed into vowels in all but one daughter language – was still not fully accepted by linguists, but Kuiper presented several innovative perspectives, particularly with respect to their reflexes in Vedic Sanskrit.

In 1955, Kuiper published an article for the Royal Netherlands Academy of Arts and Sciences entitled "Shortening of Final Vowels in the Rigveda". In it, he articulated that short vowels in the last syllable of a word followed by a historical laryngeal consonant – that is, one of the three consonant sounds of unknown articulation – led to a long vowel in Sanskrit if what followed the vowel was a consonant. However, when this vowel–laryngeal combination occurred at the end of a word or utterance, this short vowel remained unchanged. Kuiper attributed this alternation to the loss of the laryngeal in pausa, or immediately before a pause in speech. This process is now regarded as having occurred in Proto-Indo-European and has attracted study in other Indo-European languages since Kuiper's death; languages with attested evidence of this process include Tocharian, Latin, Old Norse, and Ancient Greek. Kuiper's association with this process has led to it being termed "Kuiper's law".

The following year, Kuiper began publishing increasingly about the possibilities of non-Indo-European substrate languages as etymological explanations of words in some Indo-European languages. Kuiper argued that the Greek word ἄνθρωπος (ánthrōpos, 'man'), for example, had a Pre-Greek origin rather than an Indo-European one. He abandoned the effort until much later based on what he felt was a field-wide reluctance to take non-Indo-European material seriously. In 1957, he began the Indo-Iranian Journal, an academic journal focusing on the cultures and languages of the Indo-Iranians and their descendants, with his colleague and former student J. W. de Jong.

Kuiper took on one last research assistant in 1969 before retiring in 1972 after his student E. J. Furnée achieved his doctorate in March. At only sixty-five years old, his retirement was considered early. Growing frustration with academic reforms, which were viewed as unproductive and frustrating, contributed to Kuiper's earlier-than-typical retirement.

=== Final years ===
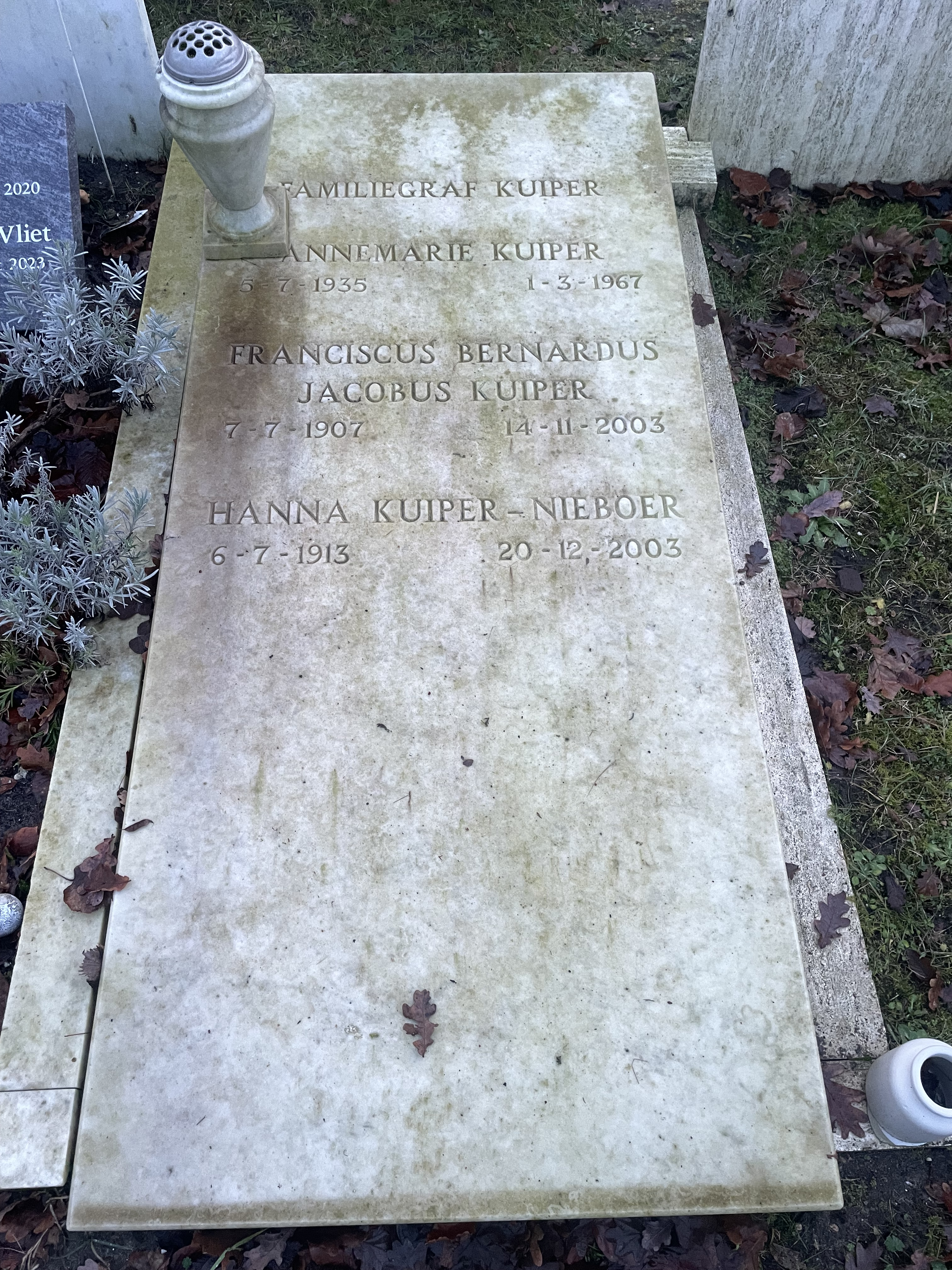
Kuiper family grave at Rhijnhof cemetery in Leiden

Later in his life, Kuiper married Hanna (née Nieboer), whom he was with for over thirty-five years at the time of his death. (Note: It is unclear when the couple married, though it was at some point before 15 February 1982.) As he began to age, Kuiper's eyesight deteriorated tremendously to the point where he could no longer drive. He was able to have it corrected through eye surgery and immediately bought a new BMW when he could drive again. Although he continued to write in his nineties, his eyesight began to fail again and he came to increasingly have to care for his wife. Despite this, he remained active in academia well into his final years; he described one paper as his "swan song", but ended up publishing three more thereafter and was at academic events until May 2002.

On the morning of 14 November 2003, Kuiper died in Zeist at the age of 96. His wife died less than six weeks later. Kuiper had five children, though one predeceased him. He is buried in Rhijnhof cemetery in Leiden.

== Recognition and legacy ==
In 1967, Kuiper was made a Knight in the Order of the Netherlands Lion, in recognition of his eminence as a professor of linguistics. Although he generally shied away from public praise, Kuiper was honored with his own Festschrift the following year, entitled Pratidānam, for his sixtieth birthday. His work on laryngeal theory laid the groundwork for his student Robert S. P. Beekes's 1969 doctoral dissertation, The Development of the Proto-Indo-European Laryngeals in Greek, and later influenced Beekes's own student, M. C. Monna. Kuiper himself only had four graduate students during his academic career. Kuiper continued to be the editor-in-chief for the Indo-Iranian Journal until 1979, though he remained involved in the editorial process well after that. Kuiper returned as editor-in-chief for one issue in 1990, with Henk Bodewitz taking over thereafter.

Kuiper had a strong presence in his field, including several memberships and honorary memberships in various societies and academies. In addition to his membership in the Royal Netherlands Academy of Arts and Sciences, he served as president of the International Association for Tamil Research, was a foreign member of the Royal Danish Academy of Sciences and Letters, was a corresponding member of the Austrian Academy of Sciences, and held honorary memberships in the Linguistic Society of America, the American Oriental Society, the Bhandarkar Oriental Research Institute. He was most proud of his American memberships in particular. Kuiper was also at one point the director of the Kern Institute, a society dedicated to the study of South Asia with a focus on India and Tibet.

Following his death, Michael Witzel described him as "my last Guru", writing that his work "represents some of the most innovative and lasting research done in [Indology] during the past century". Henk Bodewitz wrote that Jan Gonda and Kuiper helped elevate Dutch Indology and its related disciplines internationally. Tatyana Elizarenkova, a close colleague of Kuiper's, echoed this sentiment; she relates Kuiper to a strong tradition of Indology in the Netherlands that has been recognized worldwide and states that his works in particular "mark a new stage, a turning point" for the fields he was involved in. Along with those of Van Wijk and Uhlenbeck, the Russian-Dutch linguist Alexander Lubotsky described Kuiper's contributions to Leiden University as having created a tradition of intellectual rigor which helped elevate the institution in Indo-European linguistics.

== Selected works ==
- Die indogermanischen Nasalpräsentia: ein Versuch zu einer morphologischen Analyse (The Indo-European Nasal Present: An Attempt at Morphological Analysis, 1934), dissertation
- Die indogermanischen Nasalpräsentia (1937), trade edition
- Zur Herkunft von Lat. Iste ('On the Origin of Latin Iste', 1939)
- De goddelijke moeder in de Voor-Indische religie ('The Divine Mother in the Pre-Indian Religion', 1939)
- Notes on Vedic Noun-Inflexion (1942)
- Proto-Munda Words in Sanskrit (1948)
- An Austro-Asiatic Myth in the Rigveda (1950)
- Νωροπι χαλκῳ [Nōropi khalkōi]: On the Meaning of These Words in Homer's Poems (1951)
- Shortening of Final Vowels in the Rigveda (1955)
- Nahali: A Comparative Study (1962)
- On Zarathustra's Language (1978), ISBN 0-7204-8462-6
- Varuṇa and Vidūṣaka: On the Origin of the Sanskrit Drama (1979), ISBN 0-7204-8452-9
- Ancient Indian Cosmogony: Essays Selected and Introduced by John Irwin (1983), ISBN 0-7069-1370-1
- Gopālakelicandrikā: A Kṛṣṇa-Play by Rāmakṛṣṇa (Sanskrit Text with Notes) (1987), annotated by Kuiper; ISBN 0-444-85643-9
- Aryans in the Rigveda (1991), ISBN 90-5183-307-5
- Selected Writings on Indian Linguistics and Philology (1997), ISBN 90-420-0235-2
