= Tatyana Elizarenkova =

Russian linguist (1929–2007)

- Татьяна Елизаренкова
- Born: 17 September 1929; Leningrad, Soviet Union (modern-day Saint Petersburg, Russia)
- Died: 5 September 2007 (aged 77); Moscow, Russia
- Spouse: Vladimir Toporov (died 2005)

Academic work
- Main interests: Indology; semiotics

Tatyana Yakovlevna Elizarenkova (Russian: Татьяна Яковлевна Елизаренкова; 17 September 1929 – 5 September 2007) was a Russian Indologist and linguist, known for her study of the Vedas. She was described by Wendy Doniger as "the greatest living scholar of the RigVeda, and certainly, the greatest linguist of the RigVeda". In 1972, she published a translation of selected Rigvedic hymns into Russian, which eventually evolved into a complete translation of Rigveda in the following decades, published by Nauka between 1989 and 1999 in three volumes. Her complete Russian translation of Atharvaveda was published between 2005 and 2010, also in three volumes.

In 1976, together with her husband Vladimir Toporov, she published in English a linguistic analysis of Pali: The Pali Language. She was also an expert on Hindi, and published numerous works on its grammar.

Elizarenkova and Toporov were also the chief driving forces of Tartu–Moscow Semiotic School.

India had honored her with the Padma Shri in 2004 for her contributions in the study of Vedas.

== Publications ==
- Aorist v "Rigvede", 1950
- I︠A︡zyk pali, 1965
- Issledovanii︠a︡ po diakhronicheskoĭ fonologii indoariĭskikh i︠a︡zykov, 1974
- The Pāli language, 1976
- Grammatika vediĭskogo i︠a︡zyka, 1982
- Vediĭskiĭ i︠a︡zyk, 1987
- Language and style of the Vedic R̥ṣis, 1993
- Words and things in the R̥gveda, 1995

== See also ==
- Jan Gonda – Dutch Indologist (1905–1991)
- F. B. J. Kuiper – Dutch linguist (1907–2003)
