= Natalya Guseva (disambiguation) =

Natalya Guseva (born 1972) is a Russian actress.

Natalya Guseva may also refer to:

- Natalya Romanovna Guseva, Russian ethnographer and indologist
- Natalia Vladimirovna Guseva (born 1982), Russian biathlete
- Nataliya Guseva (born 2003), Russian golfer
