= J. W. de Jong =

Dutch Indologist (1921–2000)

- Born: 15 February 1921; Leiden, Netherlands
- Died: 22 January 2000 (aged 78); Canberra, Australia
- Spouse: Gisèle Bacquès (m. 1949)

Academic background
- Education: Leiden University
- Influences: Paul Demiéville

Academic work
- Discipline: Indology
- Sub-discipline: Buddhology
- Institutions: Leiden University

Jan Willem de Jong (15 February 1921 – 22 January 2000) was a Dutch 20th-century Indologist and Buddhologist.

== Birth and education ==
J. W. de Jong was born in Leiden. He attended primary school and the Stedelijk Gymnasium in Leiden, and went on to study at the University of Leiden from 1939 to 1945, where he began his lifelong study of the "canonical languages" of Buddhism; he took Chinese as his major, while minoring in Japanese and Sanskrit. With the closing of the university in 1940, following the German invasion of the Netherlands, De Jong was forced to continue his studies on his own. With the war's end in 1945, the university reopened and De Jong passed his candidaatsexamen. In 1946, he traveled to the United States as a visiting professor at Harvard University, where he continued his study of Sanskrit texts.

From 1947 to 1950, he lived in Paris studying at both the Sorbonne and the Collège de France, where he began studying Tibetan with Paul Demiéville. While still in Paris, he met his future wife Gisèle Bacquès, whom he married in 1949. That same year, he was awarded his PhD from the University of Leiden; his doctoral thesis was a critical translation of Candrakīrti's Prasannapadā. He also began studying Mongolian.

He returned to the Netherlands in 1950 to act as senior research assistant (1950–1954) and continuing academic employee (1954–1956) at the Leiden University, working at the university's Sinologisch Instituut ('Institute of Sinology'); in 1956, he became the first Chair of Tibetan and Buddhist Studies when the position was created at the Insituut Kern (the Indological institute at Leiden). In 1957, De Jong founded the Indo-Iranian Journal with Leiden University colleague F. B. J. Kuiper in 1957 in order to facilitate the publishing of scholarly articles in Indology. In 1965, he moved to Australia to become professor of Indology at the Australian National University in Canberra, a position he held until his retirement in 1986.

De Jong became a corresponding member of the Royal Netherlands Academy of Arts and Sciences in 1978.

== Scholarship ==
De Jong was well-known for his extensive linguistic ability having had a command of Dutch, French, English, German, Chinese, Japanese, Russian, Danish, Mongolian, Sanskrit, Pāli, and Tibetan, as well as for the rather acerbic quality of his reviews. His scholarly publications number more than 800; 700 of these are reviews. He made major contributions to the field of Tibetan studies, including a study of an account of the life of Milarepa by Tsangnyong Heruka Rüpägyäncän (Gtsang-smyon he-ru-ka rus-pa'i-rgyan-can) (1490), and the editing and translation of all Dunhuang fragments apropos of the Rāmāyaṇa story in Tibetan. Furthermore, his work on Madhyamaka philosophy in the 1940s is some of the earliest to treat that topic in detail.

== Death ==
De Jong died in Canberra. In April 2000, some 12,000 items from his personal library (which itself contained over 20,000 volumes) was purchased from his family in Canberra by the University of Canterbury in Christchurch, New Zealand.

== Selected works ==
- 1949. Cinq chapitres de la Prasannapadā
- 1959. Mi la ras pa'i rnam thar: texte tibétain de la vie de Milarépa. 'S-Gravenhage: Mouton
- 1968. Buddha's word in China (George Ernest Morrison lecture in ethnology)
- 1974. A brief history of Buddhist studies in Europe and America. Supplements published in 1981 and 1991
- 1987. Lamotte and the doctrine of non-self
- 1989. The story of Rāma in Tibet. Stuttgart: F. Steiner
- 1998. "Once more, ajyate." Journal of the American Oriental Society, Vol. 118, No. 1 (Jan. - Mar., 1998), pp. 69–70
