= Victor Henry =

Victor Henry may refer to:

- Victor Henry (philologist)
- Victor Henry (actor)
- Victor Henry (fighter)
- Victor Henry, fictional soldier in The Winds of War

== See also ==
- Victor Henri, French-Russian physical chemist and physiologist
