= Scylax of Caryanda =

Greek explorer and writer of the late 6th and early 5th centuries BCE

Scylax of Caryanda (Ancient Greek: Σκύλαξ ὁ Καρυανδεύς; fl. 510s BCE) was a Greek explorer and writer of the Achaemenid Empire during the late 6th and early 5th centuries BCE. His writings are lost, though occasionally they are cited or quoted by later Greek and Roman authors. The periplus sometimes referred to as the Periplus of Scylax is, in fact, not written by him. More accurately called the Periplus of Pseudo-Scylax, it was written in about the early 330s BCE by an unknown author working in the ambit of the post-Platonic Academy or the Aristotelian Peripatos (Lyceum) at Athens.

== Exploration ==
The world according to Herodotus. The ancient Greeks imagined that the Indus flowed southeast and India was its lower basin, i.e. modern day Sindh.

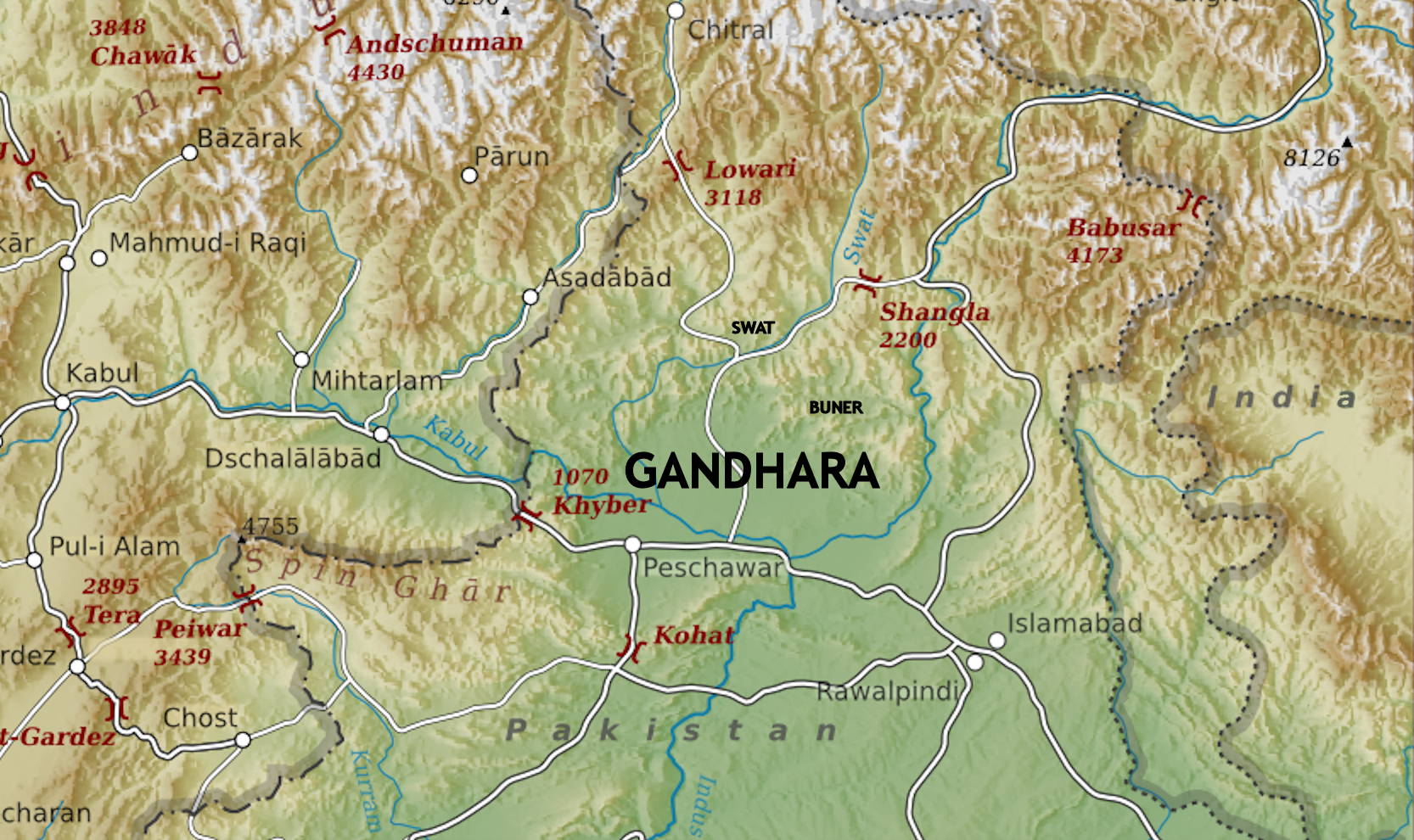
Gandhara and Peshawar on a modern Pakistan map

Scylax was from Caryanda, a small city on an island close to Iasos in Asia Minor. He was either a Greek or an ethnic Carian, who might have been familiar with Greek and used it for his writings. Not much is known about Scylax, except for the few fragments of information relayed by later Greek writers. Herodotus calls him a sea-captain from Ionia. He is said to have sailed down the Indus River at the behest of the Achaemenid emperor Darius I (522–486 BCE) and then around the Arabian peninsula to reach Suez. In the narrative of Herodotus:

Darius was the discoverer of the greater part of Asia. Wishing to know where the Indus (the only river with crocodiles, save one) ran into the sea, he sent a number of men, on whose trustworthiness he could rely, and among them Scylax of Caryanda, to sail down the river. They set out from the city of Caspatyrus, in the region called Pactyica, and sailed downstream in an easterly direction to the sea. Here they turned westward, and after a voyage of thirty months, reached the place from which the Egyptian king ... sent the Phoenicians to sail round Libya. Once the voyage was completed, Darius conquered the Indians, and made use of the sea in those parts. Thus all Asia, except the eastern section, has been found to exhibit the same features as Libya. (Herodotus, Histories 4.44)

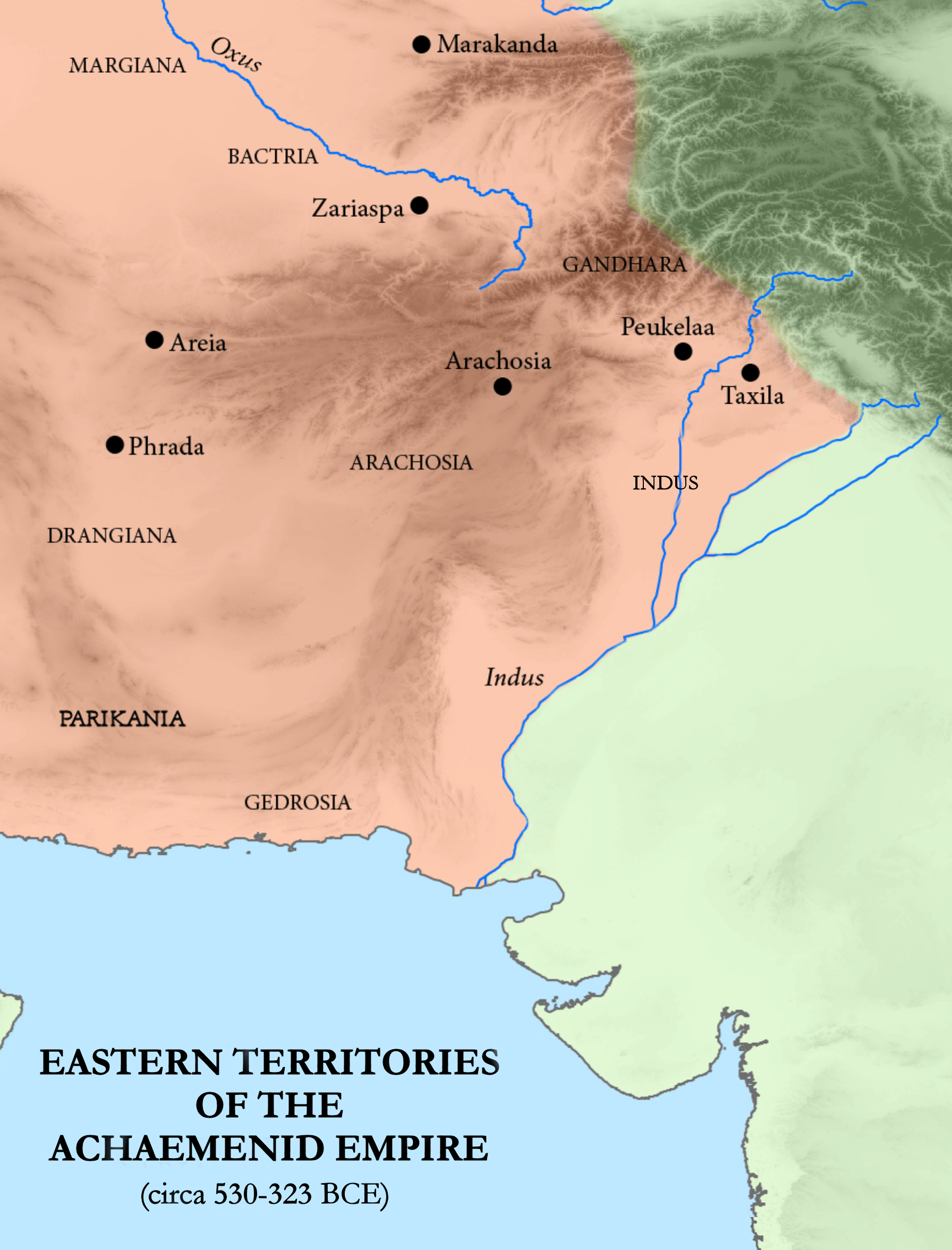
The greatest extent of the Achaemenid Empire in the east (Oxford Atlas of World History, 2002)

Several questions have been raised about this narrative. The city of Caspatyrus and the country of Pactyica have not been traced to any real locations. Assuming that it is somewhere in the vicinity of Gandhara, which was under the control of the Achaemenid emperor, it is unclear how Scylax was able to assemble a fleet of vessels in this land-locked country. More importantly, the Indus does not flow east, but rather in a south-westerly direction. Due to these reasons, some commentators doubted if Scylax's journey ever took place.

Scholars have constructed various explanations for these questions. David Bivar has noted that 'Caspatyrus' was written as 'Caspapyrus' by the later Greek writer Hekataios, and both the names seem to have been misspellings of 'Paskapyrus', a known Greek spelling of the name of Peshawar. Scylax is presumed to have started by sailing east along the Kabul River and turned south after its confluence with the Indus River near Attock. (Note: A fragment from Athanaeus cites Scylax describing the Indus passing between towering cliffs covered with wild forest and thorny plants, a description that fits the Attock gorge.) The idea that the Indus itself flowed east must have been a misunderstanding by Herodotus or his source.

Scholars state that Scylax's expedition was not merely for exploration, but rather for reconnaissance for future conquest by Darius. According to Matthew R. Christ and Grant Parker, "Herodotus presents geographical curiosity as a feature of foreign kings, particularly when they plan conquest". Olmstead characterised it as a "spying" expedition. It lasted thirty months. Soon afterwards, Darius seems to have added to his empire the lands explored by Scylax as a new province called Hinduš. It was referred to as "India" by the Greek writers. The extent of the province is not precisely known, though Herodotus's description of it as lying to the west of the desert (Thar Desert) limits it to essentially Sindh (middle and lower Indus basin).

Darius also commissioned the completion of the canal connecting the Nile with the Red Sea, stating in an inscription:

I commanded to dig this canal from the Nile...to the sea which goes from Persia; afterwards this canal [was dug] thus as I commanded, and [ships] passed from Egypt by this canal to Persia as was my [will].

Afterwards, oceanic communication between India and Persia as well as Egypt and Mediterranean were established and maintained for some time.

== Works ==
Scylax wrote an account of his travels, perhaps entitled Periplus (Circumnavigation) and said to have been dedicated to Darius. The work has disappeared except for seven quotations by later writers. The surviving quotations indicate it was not merely a logbook, but contained accounts of people, landscape, the natural conditions and perhaps also political affairs. Scholar Klaus Karttunen believes that it might have been written in Greek, in which case it would have been among the first works to be written in Greek prose. Hekataios was influenced by the work and Herodotus knew about it, though he may not have actually seen it himself.

The surviving quotations appear fabulous. One talks about Troglodytes (cave-dwellers), another about Monophthalmic (one-eyed people), yet another about Henotiktontes (people that produce only one offspring). According to Tzetzes, Scylax claimed that all these things were true and not made up. Scholar R. D. Milns states that Scylax would have reported the stories he heard from the natives, which he would have accepted in good faith.

Scylax's Periplus provided the West with its first account of the easterly people and served as a model for later Greek writers. More lastingly, it gave India its name. The people of the Indus region were referred to as Hiduš or Hi^{n}dush in Persian (due to sound change of *s > h from Proto-Iranian Sindhu). If Scylax wrote in the Ionic dialect of Greek, which did not pronounce initial h sounds, he would have transformed it to Indos (plural: Indoi). Their land was characterised as Indike (the adjectival form, meaning "Indian"). Herodotus uses these terms as equivalent to the Persian terms Hiduš and Hi^{n}dush, even though he also generalised them to all the people living east of Persia, leading to considerable ambiguities.

Scylax was famous in the ancient world. He is mentioned by Strabo as an "ancient writer." According to the Suda, he also wrote (perhaps "in the decades around 480 BC") a life of his contemporary, Heraclides of Mylasa (τὰ κατὰ Ἡρακλείδην τὸν Μυλασσῶν βασιλέα), who is mentioned in Herodotus 5.121.

== In popular culture ==
In the historical fiction novel Creation by Gore Vidal Scylax of Caryanda appears as a character who is on such familiar terms with King Darius I of Persia that they engage in humorous banter about extending Persian rule to India.

== See also ==
- List of explorers

== Sources ==
- Bivar, A. D. H. (1988), "The Indus Lands", in John Boardman; N. G. L. Hammond; D. M. Lewis; M. Ostwald (eds.), Cambridge Ancient History, Volume IV – Persia, Greece and the Western Mediterranean, c. 525 to 479 B.C. (Second ed.), Cambridge University Press, pp. 194–210, ISBN 978-0-521-22804-6
- Gray, G. B.; Cary, M. (1926), "The Reign of Darius", in J. B. Bury; S. A. Cook; F. E. Adcock (eds.), Cambridge Ancient History, Volume IV – The Persian Empire and the West, Cambridge University Press, pp. 173–228
- Karttunen, Klaus (1989), India in Early Greek Literature, Finnish Oriental Society, ISBN 978-951-9380-10-0
- Milns, R. D. (2008). "Greek Writers on India Before Alexander". Australian Journal of Politics & History. 35 (3): 353–363. doi:10.1111/j.1467-8497.1989.tb01296.x. ISSN 0004-9522.
- Mouton, Alice; Rutherford, Ian; Yakubovich, Ilya (2013), Luwian Identities: Culture, Language and Religion Between Anatolia and the Aegean, BRILL, ISBN 978-90-04-25341-4
- Olmstead, A. T. (1948), History of the Persian Empire, University of Chicago Press, ISBN 978-0-226-62777-9
- Parker, Grant (2008), The Making of Roman India, Cambridge University Press, ISBN 978-0-521-85834-2
- Vogelsang, W., "The Achaemenids and India, Two Worlds in Contact", in Heleen Sancisi-Weerdenburg; Amélie Kuhrt (eds.), Centre and Periphery: Proceedings of the Groningen 1986 Achaemenid History Workshop, pp. 93–

=== Ancient sources ===
- Herodotus, Histories, 4.44
- Aristotle, Politics, 7.13.2
- Suda, s.v. Σκύλαξ
