= Frank-Richard Hamm =

Frank-Richard Hamm (8 October 1920 — 11 November 1973) was a 20th-century Indologist and Tibetologist. He was a student of Walther Schubring.

Frank-Richard Hamm was born on 8 October 1920 in Königsberg. His family moved to Hamburg two years later where he graduated from the Kirchenpauer Gymnasium in 1939. From shortly after beginning university in 1940 until 1945 he served in the military. He completed his undergraduate studies in 1948. From 1948 to 1952 he was a tutor of Indology at Hamburg, and from 1952 to 1954 he was a member of the International Academy of Indian Culture in Nagpur, India. He worked as an academic in Hamburg, Berlin, and Bonn, where he remained as a professor from 1965 until his death.

His works were devoted to Jainism, the transmission of Sanskrit Buddhist texts in Tibetan, and the biography and poetry of the Tibetan saint Milaräpa. Hamm died on 11 November 1973.
