= Gymnasium Haganum =

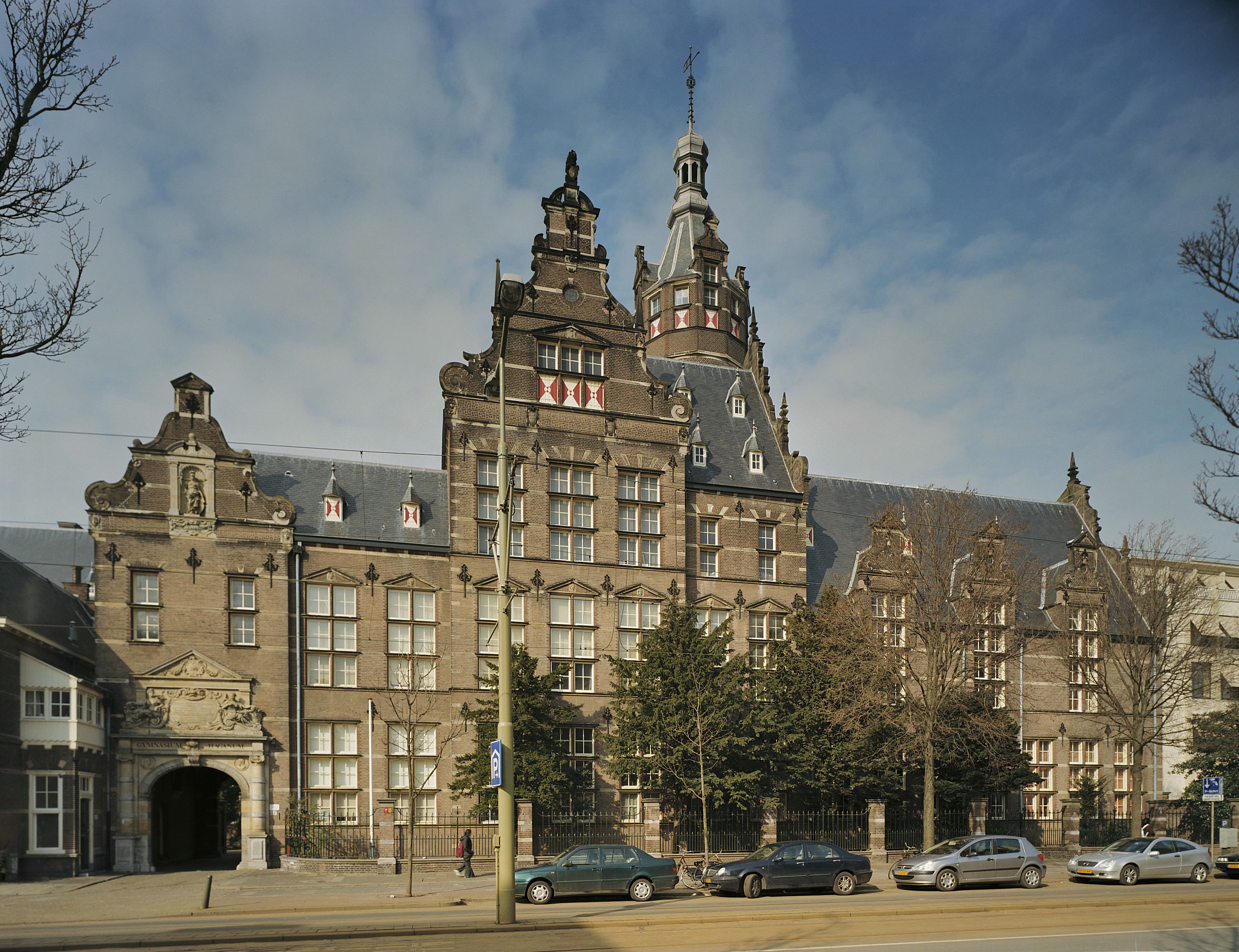
- The Gymnasium Haganum in 2004

Location
- Laan van Meerdervoort 57; The Hague, Netherlands

Information
- Type: Gymnasium
- Established: before 1327; 699 years ago
- Rector: Jan-Willem van Poortvliet
- Enrollment: 840 (2021)
- Website: www.haganum.nl

The Gymnasium Haganum is one of the oldest public schools in the Netherlands, located in the city of The Hague. First mentioned in 1327, the school is currently housed in a monumental Renaissance Revival architecture building, built in 1907. It has around 840 students, and is one of the top schools in the country, according to a yearly survey by the Dutch magazine Elsevier.

The name gymnasium refers to the type of school, the Dutch gymnasium. This type of secondary school is comparable to English grammar schools and U.S. college prep schools. In the Netherlands the gymnasium consists of six years in which pupils study the usual school subjects, with the addition of compulsory Ancient Greek and Latin, plus extra emphasis on academic and artistic skills.

== Notable alumni ==
Notable alumni include:

- Charles Ruijs de Beerenbrouck, Dutch Prime Minister
- Pieter Cort van der Linden, Dutch Prime Minister
- Annemarie, Duchess of Parma, journalist and consultant
- Frans Beelaerts van Blokland, Minister of Foreign Affairs
- Ferdinand Bordewijk, writer
- Jacobus Capitein, scholar
- Carel Gabriel Cobet, classical scholar
- Conrad Busken Huet, writer
- Willem Drees Jr., politician and economist
- Pieter Nicolaas van Eyck, poet and philosopher
- Dirk Fock, politician
- Paul Verhoeven, film director
- Herman Theodoor Colenbrander, historian
- Willem van Eysinga, diplomat and jurist
- Marcellus Emants, novelist
- Pieter Geyl, historian
- Andries Cornelis Dirk de Graeff, Minister of Foreign Affairs
- Guillaume Groen van Prinsterer, politician
- Bonifacius Cornelis de Jonge, politician
- Herman Adriaan van Karnebeek, Minister of Foreign Affairs
- Eelco van Kleffens, Minister of Foreign Affairs and diplomat
- H. G. van de Sande Bakhuyzen, astronomer
- Willem Caland, linguist
- F. B. J. Kuiper, linguist
- Bram van der Lek, politician

== See also ==
- List of the oldest schools in the world
