= Anncharlott Eschmann =

Anncharlott Eschmann (September 24, 1941, in Munich – April 6, 1977, in New Delhi) was a scholar of religion.

She was born in Munich, the first daughter of Professor Ernst Wilhelm Eschmann, a renowned Professor of Philosophy, and Mrs. Charlott Eschmann, a retired psychotherapist. She grew up in Roman Catholic Ticino (Switzerland), where her parents' house had become a constant meeting place of members of the Eranos Society. Eschmann studied Protestant theology, comparative religion and Indology in Marburg and Heidelberg. In 1969, she submitted her PhD thesis on the topic of "The idea of history in Aztec religion".

As a member of the Orissa Research Projekt, Eschmann went to India in autumn 1970. There, she encountered, for the first time, Vishwanath Baba in Joranda. Eschmann's academic research focussed on "sectarian" movements such as the Samaritans, the oppressed Jewish offspring, and Mahima dharma and the modern reform movement in Orissa. She explored the phenomenon which Srinivas labelled as Sanskritization, i.e. the continuing incorporation of "prehistoric" and popular beliefs into "high" traditions. Her work on Jagannath and Narasimha exemplified the relation of tribal deities and the Jagannath cult of Puri. From 1975, Eschmann was the head of the New Delhi branch of Heidelberg's South Asia Institute. Anncharlott Eschmann died on April 6, 1977, in New Delhi.

== Published works ==
- "Die Funktion der Geschichte im religiösen Weltbild Altmexikos". In Verhandlungen des 38. Internationalen Amerikanistenkongresses, 1968, Band II. Munich 1970: 353-359.
- "Typen der Erlösung - Bericht von der religionsgeschichtlichen Studienkonferenz in Jerusalem vom 14. bis 19. Juli 1968". In Kairos, Zeitschrift für Religionswissenschaft und Theologie, Heft 4, 1968: 286-288.
- "Die Samaritaner. 2700 Jahre Glaubensgeschichte zwischen Judentum, Christentum und Islam". In Gehört - Gelesen. Manuskriptauslese der interessantesten Sendungen des Bayrischen Rundfunks, Nr. 1, Januar 1970: 58-65.
- "Spread, Organisation and Cult of Mahima Dharma". In An Inter-Disciplinary Seminar on Mahima Dharma and Darshan, edited by D. Panda, Koraput 1972: 7-11.
- "Der Avataragedanke im Hinduismus des Neunzehnten und Zwanzigsten Jahrhunderts". In Numen: International Review for the History of Religions, vol. 19, 1972: 229-240.
- "The Role of Hindu Tradition in Contemporary India: An Interdisciplinary Study of the Temple City of Puri and the Jagannatha Cult". In Bulletin of the South Asia Institute of Heidelberg University, 1973: 92-99.
- "Religion, Reaction and Change: The Role of Sects in Hinduism". In Religion and Development in Asian Societies, Colombo 1974: 143-157.
- "Religion and Religions in Modern Hinduism". In South Asian Digest of Regional Writing, Heidelberg 1975: 2-20.
- "Spread, Organisation and Cult of Mahima Dharma". In Satya Mahima Dharma, edited by S.N. Senapati, Cuttack 1975: Dharma Grantha Store: 9-22.
- "Das religiöse Geschichtsbild der Azteken", Berlin 1976: Gebrüder Mann.
- "Hinduisation of Tribal Gods and Cults: The Shaiva and Shakta Typology". In The Cult of Jagannath and the Regional Tradition of Orissa, edited by A. Eschmann, H. Kulke and G.C. Tripathi, Delhi 1978: Manohar: 79-97.
- "Hinduisation of Tribal Gods and Cults: The Vaishnava Typlogy". In The Cult of Jagannath and the Regional Tradition of Orissa, edited by A. Eschmann, H. Kulke and G.C. Tripathi, Delhi 1978: Manohar.
- "Hinduisation of a Ritual: Prototypes of Jagannatha's Navakalevara Ceremony". In The Cult of Jagannath and the Regional Tradition of Orissa, edited by A. Eschmann, H. Kulke and G.C. Tripathi, Delhi 1978: Manohar
- "Mahima Dharma - an Autochthonous Hindu Reform Movement". In The Cult of Jagannath and the Regional Tradition of Orissa, edited by A. Eschmann, H. Kulke and G.C. Tripathi, Delhi 1978: Manohar.
- "Baum, Stein und Pfahl: Symbolik der Indischen Volksreligion". In Symbolon. Jahrbuch für Symbolforschung, Bd. 3, Köln, 1977.
