= Jan Gonda =

Dutch Indologist (1905–1991)

- A portrait of Gonda from his 1972 Festschrift
- Born: 17 April 1905; Gouda, South Holland, The Netherlands
- Died: 28 July 1991 (aged 86); Utrecht, The Netherlands

Academic background
- Education: Utrecht University
- Thesis: Δείκνῡμῐ (1929)
- Doctoral advisor: Carl Vollgraff

Academic work
- Discipline: Indo-European linguistics
- Sub-discipline: Indology

Jan Gonda (14 April 1905 – 28 July 1991) was a Dutch Indologist and the first Utrecht professor of Sanskrit. He was born in Gouda, in the Netherlands, and died in Utrecht. He studied with Willem Caland at Rijksuniversiteit, Utrecht (since 1990 Universiteit Utrecht) and from 1932 held positions at Utrecht and Leiden. He held the positions of Chair of Sanskrit succeeding Caland from 1929, as well as of Indology from 1932. He published scholarly articles on Indian Sanskrit and Indonesian Javanese texts for sixty years. In 1952, he published his monumental work on Sanskrit in Indonesia. His contributions to philology and Vedic literature has been oft-cited.

Gonda is recognized as one of the 20th century's leading scholars of Asian language, literature and religion, particularly on texts and topics related to Hinduism and Buddhism. He wrote with ease and elegance in Dutch, English and German, and had a breath-taking range of interests from the ancient literature of Indonesia and India to comparative religion and philology. Like many Orientalists of the 20th century, Gonda never visited Asia although some of his publications appeared under the auspices of the "Koninklijk Bataviaasch Genootschap van Kunsten en Wetenschappen", e.g. his comparative study on the Kavi-edition of the "Bhīşmaparwa", printed in Bandung (Java), 1937.

However, his lack of field experience was compensated for by his knowledge of Indic literature and his empathy for the religious culture of Asia. Among his many students was J. A. B. van Buitenen, who moved to the University of Chicago in 1961. Henk Bodewitz succeeded Gonda as the chair of Sanskrit at Utrecht in 1976.

Gonda left a bequest to Royal Netherlands Academy of Arts and Sciences, of which he was member since 1957, and in 1992 the Gonda Foundation was set up in his name. The foundation offers publication subsidies and grants to projects relating to Indology, the size of the grants and scope of activities being determined by the return on invested capital. The Gonda Lectures and Gonda Indological Series are also named in his honour.

Gonda died suddenly on 28 July 1991. Along with F. B. J. Kuiper, Gonda has been credited with helping elevate Dutch Indology and its related disciplines internationally.

== Publications ==
Gonda produced a substantial number of books and articles during his long career. The most useful starting point is Jan Gonda, Selected Studies, 6 vols. (Leiden: E. J. Brill, 1975–1991). These volumes contain most of his key articles.
