= Jacobus Capitein =

Dutch writer, clergyman and missionary (1717–1747)

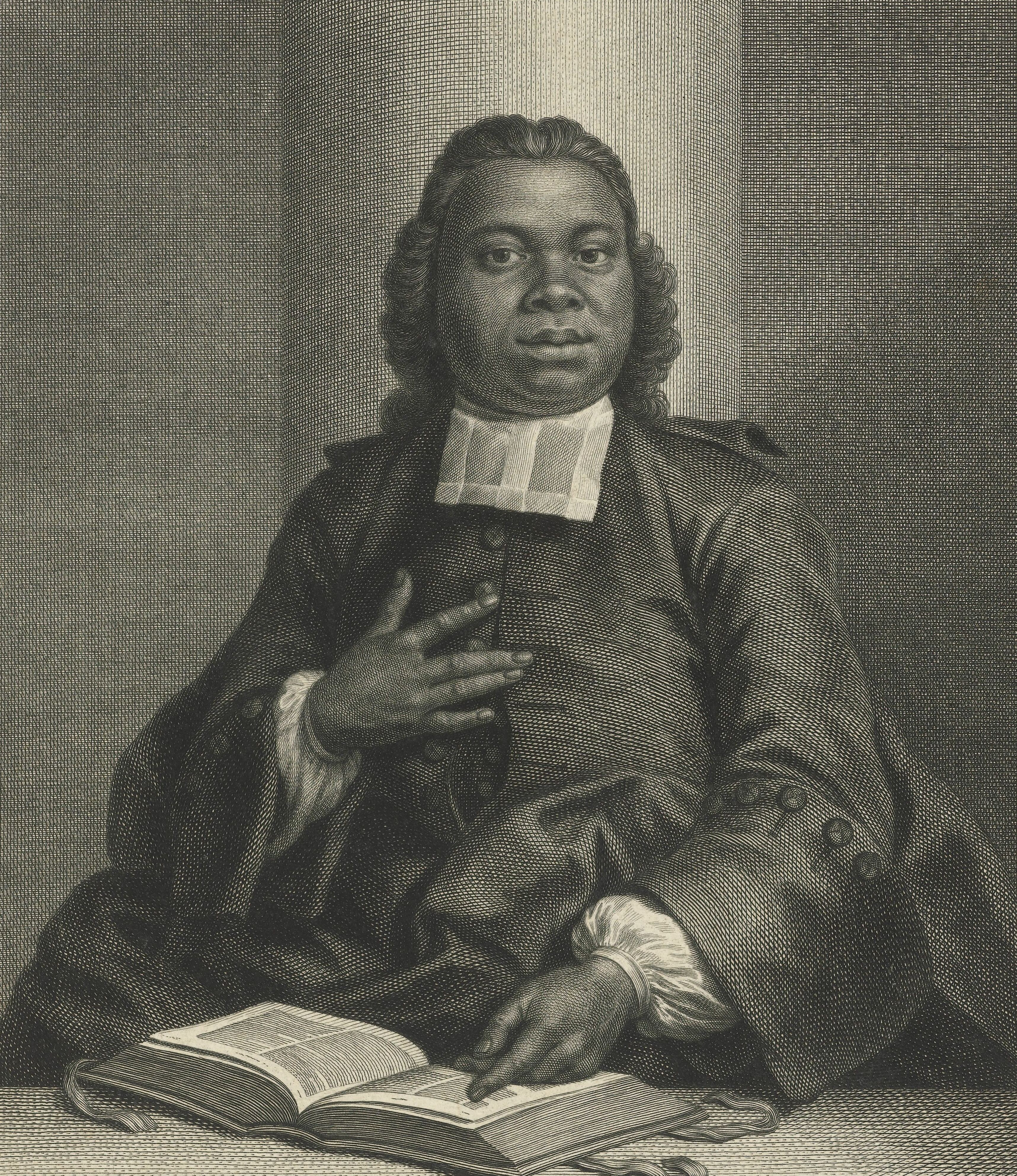
- Portrait by Pieter Tanjé, 1742
- Born: c. 1717; Elmina, West Africa
- Died: 1 February 1747 (aged 29–30); Elmina, West Africa
- Education: Leiden University
- Occupations: Writer, poet, minister and missionary
- Works: On the Calling of the Heathen (1737); Is Slavery Compatible with Christian Freedom or Not? (1742)
- Spouse: Antonia Ginderdros (m. 1746)

Jacobus Elisa Johannes Capitein (c. 1717 – 1 February 1747) was a Dutch writer, Calvinist clergyman and missionary best known for being the first individual of African descent to be ordained as a minister in an established Protestant church. Born in Western Africa, Capitein was taken to the Dutch Republic at a young age, where he studied theology and wrote on Christianity and slavery before returning to West Africa and eventually dying in debt.

Capitein was born c. 1717 in Elmina, West Africa. At the age of seven or eight, Capitein was sold into slavery and subsequently presented to a Dutch West India Company (WIC) employee named Jacobus van Goch, who took him to the Dutch Republic in 1728. Though he was technically freed by being on Dutch soil, Capitein remained with van Goch when he moved to The Hague, gradually learning to speak Dutch and being tutored in painting.

While living in The Hague, Capitein expressed an interest in studying theology, and with the support of van Goch started studying at the Gymnasium Haganum in 1731. In 1737, after his graduation, Capitein won a scholarship to study at Leiden University, joining the university's theology department. Capitein wrote a dissertation in 1742 which defended slavery on Christian grounds and received a positive reception after it was published in text form.

After he graduated from Leiden University in 1742, Capitein was ordained as a minister in the Dutch Reformed Church. He soon joined the WIC and was sent as a chaplain to Elmina Castle in Western Africa. However, his efforts to minister to WIC employees in Elmina were unsuccessful, as were Capitein's attempts to convert the local population to Christianity. After marrying an arranged wife in 1745, Capitein died two years later, deeply in debt.

== Early life ==
The man who would become known as Jacobus Capitein was born c. 1717 in Elmina, which was part of the Dutch Gold Coast. The identities of his parents are unknown, though he was "orphaned by war or some other cause". At the age of seven or eight he was captured and enslaved by slave traders who sold him to a Dutch sea captain and slave trader named Arnold Steenhart. Steenhart subsequently gifted him to a fellow slave trader, Jacobus van Goch, who was residing in Elmina. Capitein later wrote that he regarded his relationship with van Goch as that of a father and son.

In 1728, van Goch returned to the Dutch Republic after retiring from his service in the Dutch West India Company (WIC). Van Goch took the roughly 10-year-old Capitein with him, having already adopted the child into his family; Capitein later claimed that van Goch took him back to Europe because he believed that "after being duly instructed in Christianity, [Capitein] might practise some trade that was not demeaning and thereby earn a living." The merchant vessel transporting Capitein and his owner arrived in the major port city of Middelburg, Zeeland, on 14 April 1728.

Once Capitein had set foot on Dutch soil, due to there being no Dutch laws positively recognising the existence of chattel slavery he was "conferred freedom by default" (something which Capitein ignored in his later writings). However, Capitein continued to remain in van Goch's household, joining him when he moved to The Hague to settle down as a retiree. There, Capitein gradually learned how to speak the Dutch language and was tutored in the art of painting on van Goch's orders. He was also baptised into the Protestant faith by the Dutch Reformed Church in July 1735.

== Academic career ==
While living in The Hague, Capitein expressed an interest in pursuing an education in theology, which van Goch reluctantly acquiesced to. With the support of Dutch theologian and Protestant minister Henrik Velse, Capitein began studying at the Gymnasium Haganum, a public school, in 1731 "so that, God willing, I might afterwards show my people the way to a better religion, since they need to be diverted from their cult of idolatry." The tuition fees for Capitein's education at the gymnasium was paid for by several local burghers and the Leiden University administration.

At the Gymnasium Haganum, Capitein studied Hebrew, Latin, and Greek for six and a half years. In 1737, when Capitein was nearing graduation, he delivered a public lecture praising the role of Christian missions. Capitein subsequently published the lecture, titling the work as On the Calling of the Heathen (of which all copies have since been lost). After he graduated from the gymnasium, Capitein was granted a scholarship to study at Leiden University in 1739. He studied in the university's department of theology, "assuring him the best education the Netherlands could provide."

Capitein, who was most likely studying a master's degree at Leiden University, studied there for three years. While at the university, he wrote several poems and essays along with delivering sermons, many of which were subsequently published and received significant attention from the Dutch public, who "upheld [him] as an example of Christianity's universality." Two engraved portraits of Capitein were produced and sold, selling numerous copies. His final examination consisted of defending his dissertation in front of the university's professoriate "in a formal setting".

The dissertation, which was dedicated to Capitein's burgher patrons (and immediately published as a treatise after it was given under the title of Is Slavery Compatible with Christian Freedom or Not?) was a proslavery work which supported Dutch involvement in slavery by offering three key religious arguments in favour of it. According to historian Grant Parker, the fact that the dissertation was immediately published after Capitein defended it indicated "that [his work] had a wider audience beyond academe." The treatise was heavily praised by Dutch slave traders and planters.

After Capitein graduated from Leiden University in 1742, he was ordained as a minister in the Dutch Reformed Church on 6 April of that year. Capitein had written about his desire to pursue missionary work in his 1742 treatise, and entered into the employ of the WIC, which had a need for Christian chaplains in Elmina Castle. Capitein eventually decided to travel to Elmina, a decision which was supported by the Dutch Reformed Church, which had ordained him for that specific purpose. In July 1742, Capitein boarded the slave ship De Catharina Galey to travel to West Africa.

== Return to Africa and death ==
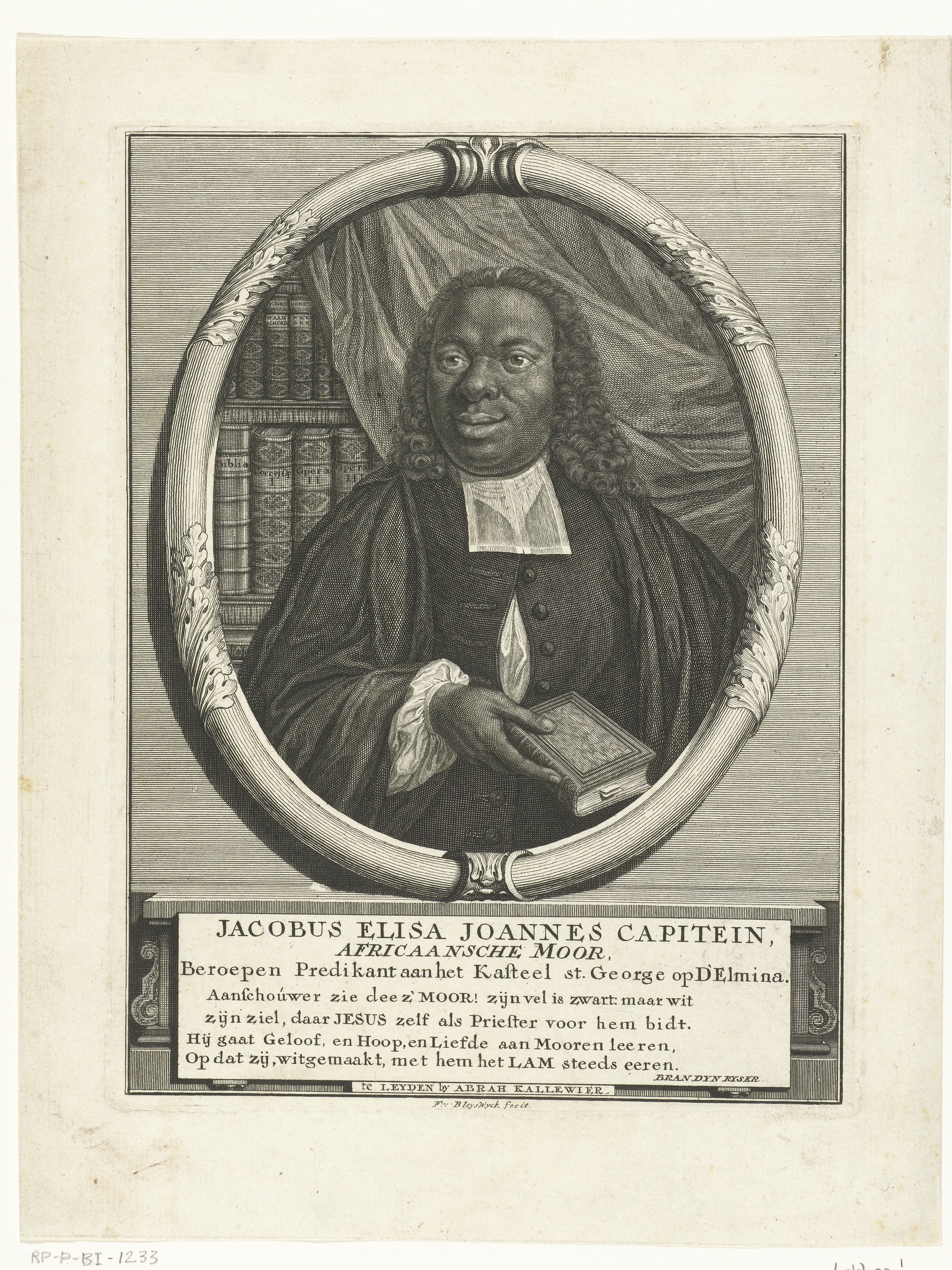
A 1742 Dutch engraving of Capitein

On 8 October, Capitein arrived in Elmina, which by this point had become a virtual colony of the WIC; most of the local population were African and resided in a village next to the castle. Capitein was charged by his superiors with ministering to the Dutch merchants, clerks and soldiers in the employ of the WIC who were stationed in Elmina Castle. However, in this role he was mostly unsuccessful, as few WIC employees in Elmina attended church on a regular basis.

Capitein also began efforts to minister to the local African population, using various methods that he had analysed and expounded in his previous writings. He established separate places of worship for African Christians, preached sermons using native languages, maintained daily contact with new converts, and trained local neophytes as missionaries. Ultimately, however, these efforts resulted in a low number of conversions to Christianity among the local population.

His ministering efforts among Elmina's African population eventually led Capitein to falling in love with a local woman in February 1743, who he soon became engaged to. Once WIC authorities in the Dutch Republic heard about the engagement, they sent Capitein orders expressly forbidding him from marrying the woman due to her not being Christian. The WIC sent a Dutch woman named Antonia Ginderdros to Elmina for him to marry; the pair married in May 1746.

While ministering in Elmina, Capitein was paid a meagre salary by the WIC, who expected him to supplement his income by engaging in private business ventures. Capitein engaged in numerous enterprises while in Elmina, though none were successful. Parker noted that as Elmina was a major hub of the Atlantic slave trade, it was a "distinct possibility" that Capitein was involved in slavery in some form, though no definite proof exists to tie him to the trade.

According to American historian Leyla J. Keough, "[gradually], Capitein declined physically, emotionally and financially." On 1 February 1747, Capitein died in Elmina of an unknown cause. He died in debt, owing large amounts of money to several local creditors (a situation which had strained the relationship between him and Ginderdros). After his death, a fellow WIC employee wrote a letter noting that in addition to his large debts, Capitein also suffered from alcoholism while residing in Elmina.

== Views on slavery and legacy ==
Capitein's modern-day reputation primarily rests on his 1742 treatise, which provided a theological defence of slavery. In the treatise, Capitein argued that slavery, instead of impeding efforts to convert Africans to Christianity, was actually beneficial to conversion efforts by bringing Christians and non-Christians closer together. Capitein rejected arguments which justified the enslavement of Africans due to their cultural and racial differences with Europeans, and insisted that Christian slaveholders give fair treatment to those they enslaved, including potentially manumitting them.

Historians have given several assessments on why Capitein chose to expound proslavery views. Historian Joseph K. Adjaye noted that Capitein had never travelled to any of the Dutch colonies in the Americas and as such had to rely on second-hand accounts as to the condition of plantation slavery there, while academic Tinyiko Makulele argues that since much of Capitein's time was spent in proximity to the WIC, he imbibed their proslavery views. In addition, Capitein spent most of his life residing in the Dutch Republic, which was a major participant in the Atlantic slave trade.

While in Elmina, Capitein translated the Bible (along with other Christian texts) from Dutch into the Fante dialect as part of his missionary efforts with the local population. Once word reached senior ministers of the Dutch Reformed Church of his efforts at translation, they "questioned aspects of Capitein's translations of Christian materials into Fanti". Similar to his frosty relationship with the WIC, Capitein frequently conflicted with the Dutch Reformed Church while in Elmina, a strong contrast with the warm relationships he enjoyed with them while in the Dutch Republic.

Among the Dutch public, views of Capitein after his death were mixed. Some who held racist views argued that his life was proof that Black people ought to be forbidden from being baptised into the Dutch Reformed Church, while others claimed that Capitein's writing skills and mastery of European languages demonstrated that Africans and Europeans were equals. In Elmina, Capitein established a children's school and orphanage for Gold Coast Euro-Africans; both the school and the orphanage continued to operate after his death, though they were eventually shut down.

== See also ==
- Anton Wilhelm Amo

== Bibliography ==
- Adjaye, Joseph K. (2018). Elmina, 'the Little Europe': European Impact and Cultural Resilience. Sub-Saharan Publishers. ISBN 978-9-9885-5096-7.
- Boaheng, Isaac (2022). A Handbook for African Mother-Tongue Bible Translators (PDF). Vernon Press. ISBN 978-1-6488-9329-2.
- Hondius, Dienke (2013). Bressey, Caroline; Adi, Hakim (eds.). Belonging in Europe: The African Diaspora and Work. Taylor & Francis. ISBN 978-1-3179-8976-9.
- Hubert, Susan J. (2006). Finkelman, Paul (ed.). Encyclopedia of African American History, 1619–1895: From the Colonial Period to the Age of Frederick Douglass. Vol. 1. Oxford University Press. ISBN 978-0-1951-6777-1.
- Keough, Leyla J. (2005). Appiah, Kwame Anthony; Gates Jr, Henry Louis (eds.). Africana: The Encyclopedia of the African and African American Experience. Oxford University Press. ISBN 978-0-1951-7055-9.
- Makulele, Tinyiko (2009). Küster, Volker (ed.). Reshaping Protestantism in a Global Context. LIT Verlag. ISBN 978-3-8258-0706-1.
- Okoledah, Norbert (2005). Problems and Prospects of the Search for a Catholic Spiritual Tradition in the Ghanaian Catholic Pastoral Ministry. LIT Verlag. ISBN 978-3-8258-8490-1.
- Otele, Olivette (2020). African Europeans. C. Hurst & Co. ISBN 978-1-7873-8191-9.
- Parker, Grant (2008). Akyeampong, Emmanuel K.; Gates Jr, Henry Louis (eds.). Dictionary of African Biography. Oxford University Press. ISBN 978-0-1953-8207-5.

=== Further reading ===
- Hondius, Dienke (Spring 2008). "Black Africans in Seventeenth-Century Amsterdam". Renaissance and Reformation / Renaissance et Réforme. 31 (2). Renaissance and Reformation: 87–150. doi:10.33137/rr.v31i2.9185. JSTOR 43445983.
- Levecq, Christine (Winter 2013). "Jacobus Capitein: Dutch Calvinist and Black Cosmopolitan". Research in African Literatures. 44 (4). Indiana University Press: 145–166. doi:10.2979/reseafrilite.44.4.145. JSTOR 10.2979.
