= Pieter Caland =

Dutch civil engineer (1826–1902)

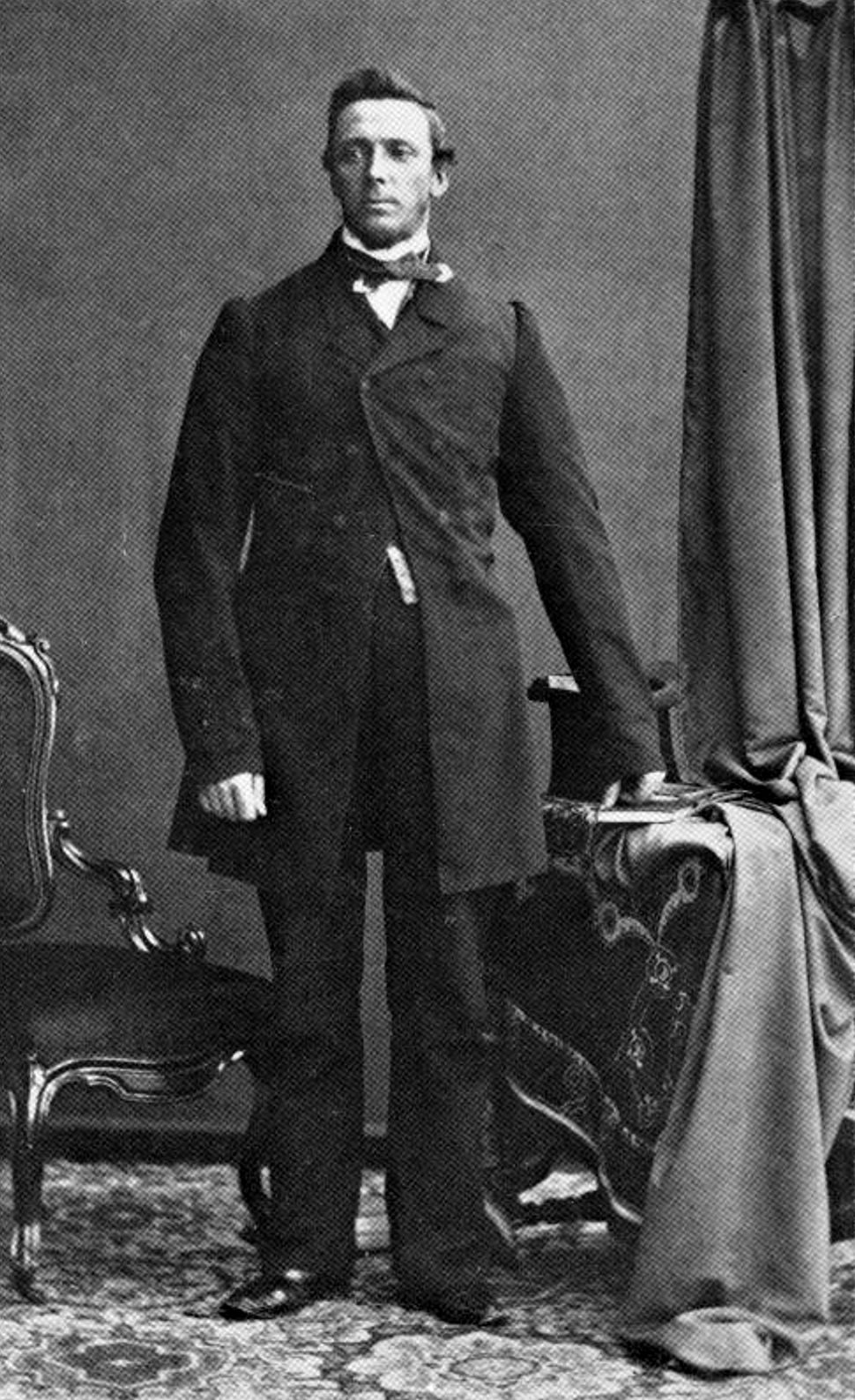
Pieter Caland

Pieter Caland (Zierikzee, 23 July 1826 – Wageningen, 12 July 1902) was a Dutch civil engineer in the service of the Rijkswaterstaat. He devised the plan for the Nieuwe Waterweg and implemented it from 1864 to 1872.

This visionary project was not without problems and setbacks. Part of the canal had to be dug through wide dunes and special provisions were made for the siting of the channel counter, leading it to run over-time and over-budget and causing Caland to be criticised. However, the new canal caused a boom in trade into Rotterdam and thus fully justified its costs.

Caland was married to Helena Carolina (née de Jong) with whom he had a son, Willem. Willem later became a linguist and Indologist, best known for the Caland system which describes the derivational morphology of some Proto-Indo-European words.

== Namesakes ==
- A canal and a bridge near Rozenburg in South Holland.
- In Rotterdam, near the Veerhaven, Calandstraat and the Calandmonument.
- In Zierikzee, the Calandweg and the Calandplein.
- In Amsterdam, the Calandlyceum in Osdorp and the Pieter Calandlaan in Osdorp.
- One of the metro lines in Rotterdam, the Caland Line, was named after him.
- In The Hague, the Calandkade, Calandstraat and the Calandplein.
- In Dordrecht, the Calandstraat and the industrial park Dordtse Kil II.
- In Breda, the De Calandstraat
- In Tilburg, the Calandhof.
- In Arnhem, the Pieter Calandweg and the industrial park De Kleefse Waard.
