= Henk Bodewitz =

Dutch Indologist (1939–2022)

- Born: 13 October 1939; Gramsbergen, Netherlands
- Died: 18 August 2022 (aged 82); Utrecht, Netherlands
- Spouse: Janneke (died 2022)
- Children: 2

Academic background
- Education: Utrecht University
- Thesis: Jaiminīya Brāhmaṇa I, 1-65: translation and commentary, with a study: Agnihotra and Prāṇāgnihotra (1973)
- Doctoral advisor: Jan Gonda

Academic work
- Discipline: Indology
- Sub-discipline: Sanskrit; Indo-European studies; historical Vedic religion
- Institutions: Utrecht University; Leiden University

Hendrik Wilhelm "Henk" Bodewitz (13 October 1939 – 18 August 2022) was a Dutch Indologist. He was a professor at the Universities of Utrecht and later Leiden between 1976 and 2002.

== Career ==
Between 1952 and 1958 he attended the gymnasium in Coevorden. He obtained a degree in classical languages at Utrecht University in 1963 and subsequently a further degree in Indo-Iranian studies in 1966.

Bodewitz started working at Utrecht University as an assistant professor of Sanskrit in 1966. He did so for two years and then became an associate professor at Leiden University, which he remained until 1976. In 1973 Bodewitz earned his PhD under Jan Gonda at Utrecht University. In 1976 he was appointed as full professor of Sanskrit and Indo-European linguistics and he succeeded Gonda in that position. In 1988 his teaching assignment was changed to Indian and Iranian languages and cultures, especially Sanskrit. In 1992 his chair was scrapped in a reorganization in which the departments of Sanskrit of Utrecht and Leiden merged. Bodewitz was able to assume the professorship of Sanskrit at Leiden University the same year.

He took up early emeritus status in 2002 due to the introduction of the Bachelor/Master system in the Netherlands. When he left he was the last full professor of Sanskrit in the Netherlands.

Bodewitz was elected a member of the Royal Netherlands Academy of Arts and Sciences in 1987. In 1988 he was a founding member of the Academia Europaea.

== Personal life and death ==
Bodewitz was born in Gramsbergen on 13 October 1939. He died in Utrecht on 18 August 2022. His wife, Janneke, died three weeks before him. They had two children.
