= Victor Henry (philologist) =

French philologist and indologist (1850–1907)

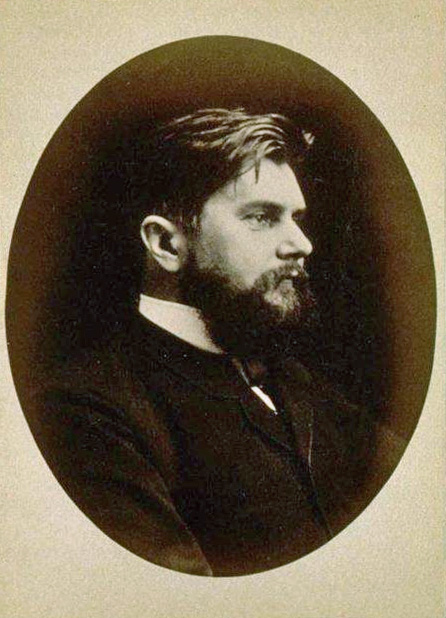
- Born: 17 August 1850; Colmar, France
- Died: 6 February 1907 (aged 56); Sceaux, France
- Occupations: philologist, Indologist

Victor Henry (French pronunciation: [viktɔʁ ɑ̃ʁi]; 17 August 1850 – 6 February 1907) was a French philologist, specializing in Indian languages.

== Biography ==
Having held appointments at the University of Douai and the University of Lille, Henry was appointed professor of Sanskrit and comparative grammar at the University of Paris. A prolific and versatile writer, he is probably best known by the English translations of his Précis de Grammaire comparée de l'anglais et de l'allemand ("Handbook of Comparative Grammar of English and German") and Précis de Grammaire comparée du Grec et du Latin ("Handbook of Comparative Grammar of Greek and Latin").

Important works by him on India and Indian languages are:

- Manuel pour étudier le Sanscrit védique ("Manual for the Study of Vedic Sanskrit", with Abel Bergaigne, 1890)
- Éléments de Sanscrit classique ("Elements of Classical Sanskrit", 1902)
- Précis de grammaire Pâlie ("Handbook of Pali Grammar", 1904)
- Les Littératures de l'Inde: sanscrit, Pâli, Prâcrit ("The Literature of India: Sanskrit, Pali, and Prakrit"; 1904)
- La Magie dans l'Inde antique ("Magic in Ancient India", 1904)
- Le Parsisme ("Parsism", 1905)
- L'Agniṣṭoma ("Angiṣṭoma: A Complete Description of the Normal Form of Soma Sacrifice in the Vedic Religion", with Willem Caland, 1906)

Native American languages (such as Siglit, Quechua, and Greenlandic), as well as the minority languages of France capture his attention, writing Lexique Étymologique du Breton moderne ("Etymological Vocabulary of Modern Breton") on Breton and Le Dialecte Alaman de Colmar ("The Alemannic Dialect of Colmar") on Alemannic German.

Le Langage martien ("The Martian Language") contains the discussion of some 40 phrases (amounting to about 500 words), which Hélène Smith (a well-known spiritualist medium of Geneva), while on a purported hypnotic visit to the planet Mars, learned, repeated, and even wrote down during her trance as specimens of a language spoken there, explained to her by a disembodied interpreter.
