= Walther Schubring =

Walter Schubring (10 December 1881 – 13 April 1969) was a German Indologist who studied Jain canons written in Prakrit and wrote several major translations. Earlier western works on Jainism had mostly examined later texts in Sanskrit.

Schubring was born in Lübeck where his father Julius was headmaster of the Katharineum. He matriculated from the Katharineum in 1900. He discovered a dictionary of Sanskrit in the library of his father which imbued an early interest in oriental languages. He then went to Munich and Strassburg Universities, receiving a doctorate in 1904 under the supervision of Ernst Leumann with a dissertation on the Kalpasutra (rules for Jain monks). He then worked as a librarian at Berlin and habilitated in 1918 with a monograph on the Mahānisīha-Sutta. In 1920 he succeed Sten Konow as professor at the University of Hamburg. He cataloged Jain texts in European libraries, studied Śvetāmbara Jainism and wrote another work on the teaching of the Jainas in 1935 which was translated into English in 1962. Frank-Richard Hamm was one of his students. During World War II, he taught Sanskrit to Louis Dumont who was then a prisoner of war in Hamburg. Schubring edited the Journal of the German Oriental Society from 1922 and visited India in 1927-28 along with Heinrich Lüders spending time in the Bhandarkar Oriental Research Institute, Poona. He retired in 1951 but continued research until his death from an accident at Hamburg.

In 1933 he was one of the signatories to the Vow of allegiance of the Professors of the German Universities and High-Schools to Adolf Hitler and the National Socialistic State.

== Writings ==
Schubring's works include:

- Mahaviras. Kritische Übersetzung aus dem Kanon der Jaina. Verlag Vandenhoeck & Rubrecht, Göttingen 1926.
- Die Jainas. Tübingen: J. C. B. Mohr 1927
- Die Lehre der Jainas: Nach den alten Quellen. Berlin, Leipzig: de Gruyter 1935
- The Doctrine of the Jainas: Described After the Old Sources. Translated from the revised German edition by Wolfgang Beurlen. Reprint. First published in 1962. Delhi: Motilal Banarsidass 1995. ISBN 81-208-0933-5.
- Die Jaina-Handschriften der Preussischen Staatsbibliothek: Neuerwerbungen seit 1891. Leipzig: Harrassowitz 1944
- Der Jainismus. Stuttgart: Kohlhammer 1964
- The Religion of the Jainas. Transl. from the German by Amulyachandra Sen; T. C. Burke. Calcutta: Sanskrit College 1966
