= Mikhail Kudryavtsev =

Russian ethnographer (1911–1992)

Mikhail Konstantinovich Kudryavtsev
- Михаил Константинович Кудрявцев
- Born: January 12, 1911; Orenburg, Russian Empire
- Died: March 4, 1992 (aged 81)
- Citizenship: Russian Empire; Soviet Union; Russia
- Occupations: Ethnographer; Ethnologist; Indologist
- Known for: Ethnography of India
- Awards: Order of the Red Star

Academic background
- Education: Doktor Nauk in Historical Sciences
- Alma mater: Leningrad State University (Graduation); Academy of Sciences of the Soviet Union (Post–graduation and Doctor Nauk)
- Thesis: Происхождение Мусульманского Населения Северной Индии (1952)
- Academic advisor: Dmitry Alexeyevich Ol'derogge (Post–graduate studies)

Academic work
- Discipline: Ethnography; Ethnology; Indology
- Institutions: Former "Senior Scientific Worker", Institute of Ethnography of Academy of Sciences of the Soviet Union

Mikhail Konstantinovich Kudryavtsev (Russian: Михаил Константинович Кудрявцев, romanized: Mikhail Konstantinovich Kudryavtsev; January 12, 1911 – March 4, 1992) was a Soviet ethnographer and Indologist.

He began his studies in the topography stream, but later focused on the fields of history and ethnography. After graduating from the Leningrad State University in history, he studied at the Academy of Sciences of the USSR till the completion of his Doktor Nauk in historical sciences. However, there was a break of several years in his post–graduate studies because of his commission in the Soviet military's technical forces during the second world war. From July 1941 to September 1945, he served at various ranks on several fronts. He had also been the head of the topographic command of the USSR's military. He recommenced his studies in 1946.

Later, he worked as a senior researcher at the academy and also lead its Indological studies. He conducted ethnographical research on several ethnic groups of India, and also studied India's social structure in the ancient and medieval times. He died at the age of 81 years and was buried at Saint Petersburg's Shuvalov Cemetery.

== Education ==
From 1929 to 1932, Kudryavtsev studied at the Leningrad Topographical Technical School, and worked as a topographer in Yakutia after the completion of the academic program.

In June 1939, he completed his graduation in history at the Leningrad State University, with a recommendation for post–graduation at the Institute of Ethnography of the Academy of Sciences of the USSR. He started his studies at the institute, but later in 1941, his studies were halted because of his dis-enrollment from the institute due to his appointment in the Soviet Military. However, in 1946, he was re–enrolled for the postgraduate studies at the institute with a specialty in the ethnography of India after an order from the presidium of the academy. He completed the Doktor Nauk in Historical Sciences at the academy in 1952, with the thesis titled "Происхождение Мусульманского Населения Северной Индии" (The Origin of the Muslim Population of Northern India).

He had also studied the English, French, Hindi, Marathi, and Urdu languages.

== World War II ==
During the second world war, Kudryavtsev served in the Soviet Military. From 1 July 1941, he worked as a topographer, and from February 1942, as a senior topographer on the Leningrad Front. From February to December 1942, he served as the platoon commander and deputy battery commander in the Red Army. He also headed the divisions of the Red Army at the Volkhov Front. After December 1942, he resumed his services as a topographer. Between December 1942 and September 1945, he was the head of the topographic services, first on the Volkhov front, and later on the second and the first Ukrainian fronts. From September to December 1945, he taught topography to the infantry officers in Lviv (Ukraine). The Soviet military units benefited in some of their onerous combat tasks from his knowledge as a topographer. He also was the chief of the "military topographic administration" and served as a Lieutenant–general in the "technical forces" of the USSR.

He was awarded the Order of the Red Star "for the defense of Leningrad". He also received the Medal "For the Victory over Germany in the Great Patriotic War 1941–1945". During his service years in the Soviet Military, he visited Romania, Poland, Germany, and Czechoslovakia.

== Academic career and research ==
Kudryavtsev was a "senior scientific worker" at the Institute of Ethnography of the Academy of Sciences of the Soviet Union. He headed the Indological research at the institute, and contributed in the development of monographic ethnic research in Russia. He had also worked as a researcher at the Peter the Great Museum of Anthropology and Ethnography. His main area of study was India's ethnography and northern India's ethnology. The Saint Petersburg State University views him as one of the "fathers of Indian Ethnography in Russia".

He visited India five times between 1957 and 1974. In 1966, the Anthropological Survey of India had invited him and Nikolai Cheboxarov in India for a study on the anthropological data gathered in 1964 on Asurs, Korkus, Gondas, Pradhans, Khasis and the Hindustanis of the Lucknow region. They studied these people with the assistance of P. Gupta. Earlier, he did an ethnographic study on the Jats of India.

He also studied the social history of India, including the structure of society in ancient and medieval India. He concurred with M. N. Srinivas's categorization of relationships in the Indian society in two categories — vertical (inter-caste) and horizontal (intra-caste). He was of the view that the seeds of the caste system were sown nearly two millenniums ago in India. According to Kudryavtsev, "the core of the caste system, in the form of the varnas, took shape over 2,000 years ago — almost in the Vedic period. The caste system became increasingly sophisticated with the development of technology, the growing division of labor, and the emergence of new occupations. It thus survived through the colonial period, the expansion of capitalism, and the establishment of the Republic". He also inquired into the jajmani system as a mechanism of interaction between the communities and castes in India.

== Death ==
Kudryavtsev died at the age of 81 years on 4 March 1992. He was buried at the Shuvalov cemetery in Saint Petersburg.

== Works ==
=== Books ===
- Kudryavtsev, M. K. (1992). Кастовая система в Индии [The Caste System in India] (in Russian). Moscow, Russia: Nauka. ISBN 978-5020171961.
- Kudryavtsev, M. K. (1971). Община и каста в Хиндустане [Community and Caste in Hindustan] (in Russian). Moscow, USSR: Nauka.

=== Selected papers ===
- The Indian Caste Community as a Social System
- Ethnos and Caste in the Indian Society
- The Language Problem for the Adivasis of India
- The Main Characteristics of the Village Communities of Northern India
- On the Languages as the Media of Education in the Schools for the Scheduled Tribes in India
- The Buddhist University in Nalanda
- On the Role of Jats in Northern India's Ethnic History (1964)

== See also ==
- Natalya Romanovna Guseva
- Sergei Tokarev
- Yuri Kobishchanov
