= Willem Caland =

Dutch Indologist (1859–1932)

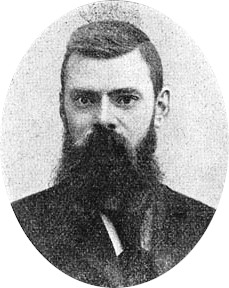
- Caland, c. 1906
- Born: August 27, 1859; Brielle, Netherlands
- Died: March 23, 1932 (aged 72); Utrecht, Netherlands
- Education: University of Leiden
- Known for: Caland system
- Spouse: Jennij Elisabeth van Hettinga Tromp (m. 1883)
- Children: 1
- Scientific career
- Fields: Indology, philology, translation, Indo-European linguistics
- Institutions: University of Utrecht
- Thesis: De nummis M. Antonii IIIviri vitam et res gestas illustrantibus commentatio
- Doctoral advisor: Carel Gabriel Cobet

Willem Caland (August 27, 1859 – March 23, 1932) was a Dutch Indologist, philologist, numismatist, and translator. He studied in Leiden and graduated in 1882. In Indo-European studies, the Caland system is named after him.

== Biography ==
Willem Caland was born on August 27, 1859 to Pieter Caland, a hydraulic engineer who became well known for working on the Nieuwe Waterweg, and Helena Carolina (née de Jong). From a young age, he struggled with a heart condition after an attack of "synovial rheumatism" that kept him from any strenuous exertion. Interested in literature from an early age, he attended the Gymnasium Haganum and later successfully completed his entrance exams to university, registering as a student at the University of Leiden in 1877. There, he attended lectures on classical languages, most notably H. Kern's lectures on Sanskrit and Avestan. After completing his doctoral examination in 1882, he was appointed to teach classical languages in Maastricht. He obtained his doctorate from the University of Leiden within a year with his thesis focusing on Roman numismatics, nominally under the advisor Carel Gabriel Cobet, but he primarily sought help from Jan Jacob Cornelissen. The same year, he married Jennij Elisabeth van Hettinga Tromp, with whom he had one daughter. In 1887, he moved to Breda, where he became conrector at the local gymnasium. In 1897, he became member of the Royal Netherlands Academy of Arts and Sciences.

His heart condition was severe enough that it kept him from traveling to India for his studies. With the support of Kern, he initially focused on ancient Indian ancestor worship and related topics. His understanding of the historical Vedic religion earned him significant prominence, particularly his studies of the brahmanas and translations and commentaries on the sutras. He began teaching Sanskrit at the University of Utrecht in 1902. In February 1903, he was appointed as a lecturer of Indology, which he converted into a comparative linguistics professorship for comparisons between Indo-Aryan and Germanic languages in June 1906. He turned down an appointment to the University of Leiden in 1913. In May 1917, his position was converted to an ordinariate, which added Old Persian and Avestan to his professorship. He also served as a part of the management for the Provincial Utrecht Society of Arts and Sciences.

On March 23, 1932, Caland died in Utrecht as a result of his heart condition.

== Selected works ==
- Altindischer Ahnencult (German: Ancient Indian Ancestor Worship, 1893)
- Die altindischen Todten- und Bestattungsgebräuche (German: The Ancient Death and Funeral Customs, 1896)
- Altindisches Zaubermaterial (German: Ancient Indian Witchcraft Material, 1900)
- L'agniṣṭoma. Description complète de la forme normale du Sacrifice de Soma dans le culte védique (French: Angiṣṭoma: A Complete Description of the Normal Form of Soma Sacrifice in the Vedic Religion, 1906-7; written with Victor Henry)
- Altindisch Zauberei. Darstellung der altindischen "Wundschopfer" (German: Ancient Indian Witchcraft: A Description of the Ancient Indian "Wish Sacrifices", 1908)
