= Indo-Iranian Journal =

- Discipline: Indo-Iranian studies
- Language: English
- Edited by: Peter Bisschop and Jonathan Silk

Publication details
- History: 1957-present
- Publisher: Brill Publishers
- Frequency: Biannually

Standard abbreviations
- ISO 4: Indo-Iran. J.

Indexing
- ISSN: 0019-7246 (print); 1572-8536 (web)
- LCCN: 90657465
- OCLC no.: 41568651

Links
- Journal homepage

Indo-Iranian Journal is a peer-reviewed academic journal focusing on aspects of Indo-Iranian cultures. The journal was started by J. W. de Jong and F. B. J. Kuiper in 1957 with Ludwig Alsdorf, Harold Walter Bailey, Louis Renou, Sumitra Mangesh Katre and Daniel H. H. Ingalls on its editorial board. Currently its editors-in-chief are Peter Bisschop (Leiden University) and Jonathan Silk (Leiden University).
