= Carel Gabriel Cobet =

Dutch classical scholar (1813–1889)

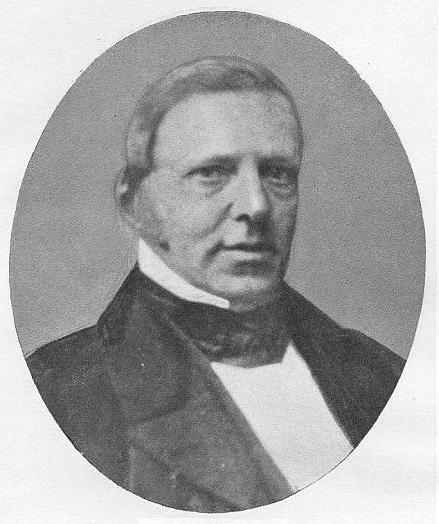
Carel Gabriel Cobet

Carel Gabriel Cobet (28 November 1813 – 26 October 1889) was a Dutch classical scholar.

== Biography ==
He was born in Paris, but educated in the Netherlands, at the Gymnasium Haganum and the University of Leiden. The university conferred on him an honorary degree, and recommended him to the government for a travelling pension. The ostensible purpose of his journey was to collate the texts of Simplicius of Cilicia, which, however, engaged but little of his time. He contrived to study almost every Greek manuscript in the Italian libraries, and returned after five years with an intimate knowledge of palaeography.

In 1846 Cobet was married, and in the same year was appointed to an extraordinary professorship at Leiden. He spent the rest of his life there. An appreciative obituary notice by WG Rutherford appeared in the Classical Review of December 1889.

== Works ==
In 1836 Cobet won a gold medal for an essay entitled Prosopographia Xenophontea, a description of the characters in the Memorabilia, Symposium and Oeconomicus of Xenophon. His Observationes criticae in Platonis comici reliquias (1840) revealed his critical faculty.

Cobet's 1846 inaugural address, De Arte interpretandi Grammatices et Critices Fundamentis innixa, has been called the most perfect piece of Latin prose written in the 19th century. In 1850 Cobet published a major critical edition of the Lives of Eminent Philosophers (Diogenis Laertii De Clarorum philosophorum vitis, dogmatibus et apophthegmatibus libri decem, Pariisis, Didot).

In 1856 he became joint editor of Mnemosyne, a philological review, which he soon raised to a leading position among classical journals. He contributed to it many critical notes and emendations, which were afterwards collected in book form under the titles Novae Lectiones, Variae Lectiones and Miscellanea Critica. In 1875, he took a prominent part in the Leiden Tercentenary, and impressed all his hearers by his facility in Latin improvisation. In 1884, when his health was failing, he retired as emeritus professor.

Cobet's special weapon as a critic was his consummate knowledge of palaeography, but he also had a rare acumen and wide knowledge of classical literature. He may have been over-enthusiastic in his emendation of difficult passages, ignoring the comments of other scholars. He had little sympathy for the German critics, and maintained that the best combination was English good sense with French taste. He always expressed his obligation to the English, saying that his masters were three Richards: Richard Bentley, Richard Porson and Richard Dawes.
