= Grant Parker =

South African classics scholar (born 1967)

Grant Parker (born 16 March 1967) is a South African-born associate professor of classics at Stanford University in the United States. Parker's principal research interests are Imperial Latin Literature, the portrayal of Egypt and India in the Roman Empire and Classical Reception in South Africa.

== Life ==
Grant Parker was born in South Africa and studied at Cape Town (BA in English and Latin in 1988 and MA in Latin, 1991) and Princeton (PhD, Classical Philology, 1999). After graduating from Princeton, he was a postdoctoral fellow and assistant professor at the University of Michigan (1999–2001) before being appointed assistant professor of Latin in the Department of Classical Studies at Duke University in 2001. He was named an emerging scholar by Black Issues in Higher Education in 2003. In 2006 he moved to Stanford University and was appointed associate professor of classics in 2009. He also maintains an affiliation as an extraordinary professor at Stellenbosch University in South Africa.

Parker has written two academic monographs, co-edited two volumes, produced over twenty articles in academic journals and encyclopedias and is a contributor to the Thesaurus Linguae Latinae. His first book, The Agony of Asar was a translation, introduction and commentary on an eighteenth-century defence of slavery written by a former slave, Jacobus Capitein. His second, The Making of Roman India, examined attitudes towards India in the Roman Empire and was published in 2006. He is also the co-editor of a further volume on Rome and India, Ancient India in its Wider World, and Mediterranean Passages: readings from Dido to Derrida, a reader of selected passages from antiquity to the modern world which concern the Mediterranean's role as a meeting point between culture.

== Works ==
- The Agony of Asar: a thesis on slavery by the former slave, Jacobus Eliza Johannes Capitein, 1717-1747. Translated with introduction and commentary. Princeton: Markus Wiener Publishers, 2001 ISBN 9781558761261
- The Making of Roman India. Cambridge: Cambridge University Press, 2008 ISBN 978-0521858342
- Ancient India in its Wider World. Ann Arbor: Center for South and South East Asian Studies, University of Michigan, 2008 (co-editor with Carla Sinopoli) ISBN 978-0-89148-092-1
- Mediterranean Passages: readings from Dido to Derrida. Chapel Hill: University of North Carolina Press, 2008 (co-editor with Miriam Cooke and Erdağ Göknar) ISBN 978-0807858714
- South Africa, Greece, Rome: Classical Confrontations. Cambridge University Press, 2017 (editor)
