= Julius Schubring =

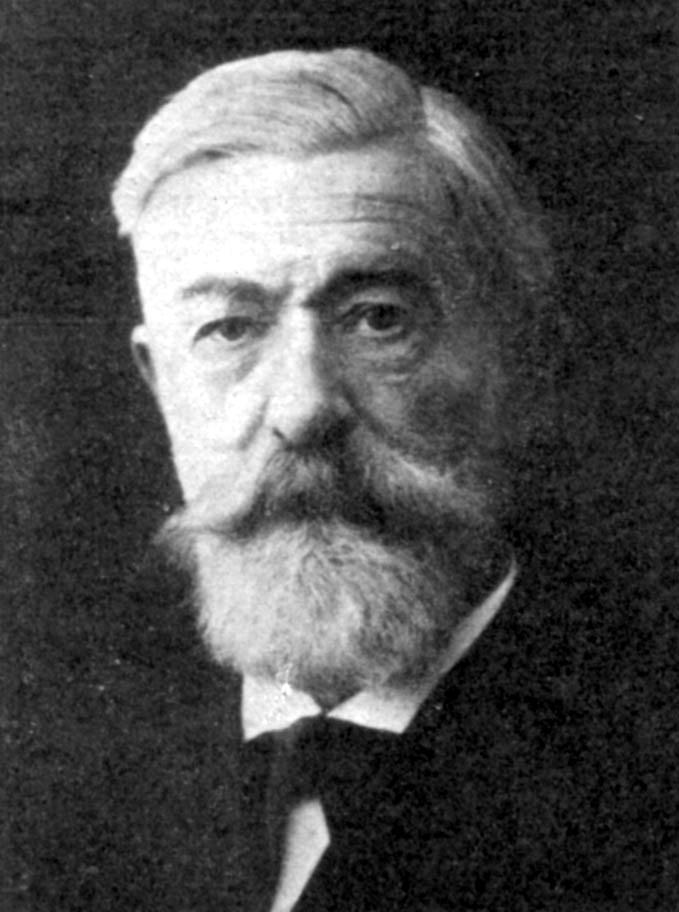
Julius Schubring (1839–1914)

Johannes Julius Schubring (28 March 1839, Dessau – 5 June 1914) was a German classical scholar, known for his studies on the archaeological topography of Sicily. He was the son of the clergyman Julius Schubring (1806–1889), friend of Felix Mendelssohn, for whom he wrote the librettos of the oratorios St. Paul and Elijah.

From 1857 to 1862 he obtained his education at the universities of Erlangen, Bonn and Göttingen, and afterwards spent several years working as a tutor in Sicily. In 1868 he was appointed head teacher at the Katharineum in Lübeck, where in 1880 he succeeded Johann Friedrich Breier (1813–1880) as director.

Thomas Mann portrayed Julius Schubring in his first novel, Buddenbrooks as the head teacher, Prof. Wulicke. Schubring's youngest son Walther Schubring became an Indologist.

== Selected works ==
- Achradina. Ein Beitrag zur Stadtgeschichte von Syrakus, 1865 – Achradina: a contribution to the local history of Syracuse.
- Sicilische Studien. - Kamikos - Trickala - Caltabellotta, 1866 – Sicilian studies. Kamikos; Trickala; Caltabellotta.
- Akrä-Palazzolo. Eine topographisch-archäologische Skizze, 1867 – Akrai-Palazzolo: a topographical and archaeological sketch.
- Historische Topographie von Akragas in Sicilien während der klassischen Zeit, 1870 – Historical topography of Akragas in Sicily during the Classical period.
- Historische Topographie von Panormus, 1870 – Historical topography of Panormus.
- Kamarina, 1873 – Kamarina.
