= Calanda =

Calanda may refer to:

- Calanda, Spain, a town in Aragon, Spain
- Calanda (mountain) in the canton of Grisons, Switzerland
- Calanda Bräu, a brewery in Chur, Switzerland, now owned by Heineken International
- Calanda (plant), a genus of the family Rubiaceae
- Miracle of Calanda

== See also ==
- Calanca, municipality in the canton of Grisons, Switzerland
- Foz-Calanda, a town in the province of Teruel, Aragon, Spain
- Samper de Calanda, a town in the province of Teruel, Aragon, Spain
