= Natalya Romanovna Guseva =

Russian ethnographer and Indologist (1914–2010)

- Наталья Романовна Гусева
- Born: Natalya Romanovna Chetyrkina; March 21, 1914; Rubezhovka, Kiev Governorate
- Died: April 21, 2010 (aged 96)
- Citizenship: Russian Empire; Soviet Union; Russia
- Occupations: Ethnographer; Historian; Indologist
- Known for: Research on the ethnography and religions of peoples of India
- Spouses: V. N. Gusev (1st); Svyatoslav Igorevich Potabenko (2nd)
- Awards: Jawaharlal Nehru Award

Academic background
- Education: Doctor in Historical Sciences
- Alma mater: Leningrad State University; Institute of Ethnography of the Academy of Sciences of the Soviet Union
- Thesis: Этнический состав населения Южной Индии (Candidate of Sciences); Индуизм: История формирования. Культовая практика (Doctor of Sciences)

Academic work
- Discipline: Ethnography; History; Indology
- Institutions: Former "Senior Scientific Worker", Institute of Ethnography of the Academy of Sciences of the Soviet Union
- Main interests: History and ethnography of the peoples of India

Natalya Romanovna Guseva (Russian: Наталья Романовна Гусева, romanized: Natalya Romanovna Guseva; March 21, 1914 – April 21, 2010) was a Russian ethnographer, historian, Indologist and writer.

Born at a village in the Kiev Governorate, she did her Candidate of Sciences and Doctor of Sciences from the Institute of Ethnography of the Academy of Sciences of the Soviet Union in 1951 and 1978, respectively. She worked at the Institute of Ethnography from 1952 until her retirement in 1998, however from 1963 to 1964, she had worked at the House of Soviet Culture in Delhi. She died at the age of 96 years.

== Early life and family ==
Guseva was born as Natalya Romanovna Chetyrkina on 21 March 1914 at Rubezhovka village in the Kiev Governorate. She was orphaned at an early age. After her schooling, she worked in a tire factory and simultaneously studied in a technical school for rubber industry. She first married V. N. Gusev, an engineer, and later married Svyatoslav Igorevich Potabenko who was also an Indologist.

== Education, career and research ==
Guseva developed interest in the eastern world, and in 1940, completed her graduation from the Leningrad State University with a specialty in Indology. Later, she worked at the Institute of Ethnography in Moscow as an employee, but in 1946, she joined the institute as a student for further studies. From 1950 to 1952, she worked as a research assistant at the Institute of Oriental Studies of the Academy of Sciences of the Uzbek SSR. In 1951, she came to Moscow and completed her Candidate of Sciences at the Institute of Ethnography with the defense of her thesis titled "Этнический состав населения Южной Индии" (The Ethnic Composition of the Population of South India). Later in 1952, she left Uzbekistan and on the invitation of Sergey Pavlovich Tolstov, she started working again at the Institute of Ethnography of the Academy of Sciences of the Soviet Union where she worked until her retirement in 1998. However, from 1963 to 1964, she had worked as the senior methodologist of the Russian language at the House of Soviet Culture in Delhi. In 1978, she completed her Doctor of Sciences at the institute with the defense of her thesis titled "Индуизм: история формирования. Культовая практика" (Hinduism: The History of Formation. Cultic Practice). Sergei Aleksandrovich Tokarev evaluated Guseva's dissertation for the Doctor of Sciences and its defense by her. He rated her dissertation as "dilettantish", but viewed her defense of it as brilliant.

In her research, she worked to identify common features between the Hindu and Slavic mythologies. In the later part of her life, she fixated on the idea of a common ancestral homeland of the Indians and Slavs. She authored a book on this subject in 2003, titled "Русский Север – прародина индославов" (The Russian North — The Ancestral Home of the Indo–Slavs (Note: The term Indo–Slav refers to "the remote ancestors of the Aryans and the Slavs".)), a second edition of which was published in 2010.

She was a member of the Union of Soviet Writers, and later became a member of the Union of Russian Writers. She delivered a number of lectures for the Union of Soviet Societies for Friendship and Cultural Relations with Foreign Countries.

=== Jainism ===
Guseva was a Jainologist. Along with a number of her contemporary researchers, Guseva also suggested that Jainism originated long before 500 BCE. According to Guseva, Jainism is very different from Brahmanism and the Vedic religion and it does not believe in the Varna system, rejects the concept that Veda is holy, and opposes the concept of gods being the center of worship. Tokarev termed Guseva's claim of Jainism being the most ancient, and even pre-median, religion of India as doubtful.

== Criticism ==
Victor Schnirelmann claimed that Guseva and Aleksandr Gelyevich Dugin augmented and propagated "the Slavicized version of the German 'Aryan Myth'". According to Schnirelmann, the myth states that the Russians are the "most ancient" people, whose first homeland was the Arctic, which was also the Pagan gods' "native land", and where once existed subtropical environmental conditions. With time, "rapid glaciation" occurred in the area, as a result of which, the Russian people headed towards south where they "established a high civilisation" (according to some writers, in the Southern Urals region). It also claims that, in the Arctic, the Russians had "developed an early system of Vedaic knowledge and, in some versions, even invented the earliest writing". Later on, the Russian people who migrated to Eurasia, carried with them knowledge and an "advanced culture" in the region. In the opinion of Schnirelmann, "it is impossible to confirm this view with archaeological or historical evidence". Schnirelmann highlighted that the works authored by Guseva were "cited by many contemporary ultra-nationalists of the Aryan pursuasion". In 1999, he noted that lately Guseva "distanced herself from Neo-Nazi and racist constructions" and that she had appealed for "a more sober evaluation of Arkaim".

== Death ==
Guseva died on 21 April 2010 at the age of 96 years, and honoring her request, her family members scattered her ashes in the Ganges in India.

== Works ==
Guseva published around 200 articles in various scientific journals and wrote 16 monographs. She translated Indological literature from the English language to the Russian language. She wrote a play titled "Ramayana" that was based on the ancient Indian epic of the same name, which was performed at various theaters in Russia, and one of the performances was attended by Jawaharlal Nehru. In 2000, she translated the book "The Arctic Home in the Vedas" written by Bal Gangadhar Tilak in 1903.

The Government of India gave her the Jawaharlal Nehru Award for her contributions towards the development of Russia–India relations.

=== Books ===
- Guseva, N. R. (2010). Арии и древнеиндийские традиции [The Aryans and Ancient Indian Traditions] (in Russian). Moscow, Russia: Белые Альвы [Belye Al'vy]. ISBN 978-5914640351. LCCN 2010482471. OCLC 667878768.
- Guseva, N. R. (2008). Легенды и мифы Древней Индии [The Legends and Myths of Ancient India] (in Russian).
- Guseva, N. R. (1998). Русские сквозь тысячелетия: арктическая теория [The Russians Across the Millennia: Arctic Theory] (in Russian). Moscow, Russia: Белые Альвы [Belye Al'vy]. ISBN 978-5761900660. LCCN 99161696. OCLC 41231657.
- Guseva, N. R. (1989). Раджастханцы: народ и проблемы [Rajasthanis: People and Problems] (in Russian). Moscow, Russia: Nauka. ISBN 978-5020164994. LCCN 91137208. OCLC 1002883108.
- Guseva, N. R. (1987) [1971]. Многоликая Индия [The Diverse India] (in Russian) (3rd, revised ed.). Moscow: Nauka. LCCN 87178045. OCLC 18833218.
- Guseva, N. R. (1971). Индия: тысячелетия и современность [India: Millenniums and Modernity] (in Russian). Moscow, Russia: Nauka. OCLC 19746613.
- Guseva, N. R. (1968). Джайнизм [Jainism] (in Russian). Moscow, Russia: Nauka. LCCN 76389673. OCLC 613961428.

=== Books edited ===
- Guseva, N. R., ed. (1996) [First published 1994]. Древность: Арьи. Славяне [Antiquity: Aryans. Slavs] (in Russian) (2nd ed.). Moscow, Russia: Палея [Paleya]. LCCN 97115513. OCLC 36371028.

=== Selected papers ===
- Guseva, N. R. (2004). "Jainism More Steadfast to Life". In Chanchreek, K. L.; Jain, Mahesh (eds.). Jainism and Western Thinkers: Classic Essays on Jainism by Western Orientalists. New Delhi, India: Shree. pp. 334–341. ISBN 978-8188658282. OCLC 255081660.
- Guseva, N. R. (1975). "History of Jainism". In Jain, Akshaya Kumar (ed.). Lord Mahavira in the Eyes of Foreigners (1st ed.). New Delhi, India: Meena Bharati. pp. 156–162. LCCN 75902426. OCLC 2119130.
- Guseva, N. R. (2004) [Article first published: 1971]. "Modern Period of the Development of Jainism". In Sharma, Suresh K.; Sharma, Usha (eds.). Cultural and Religious Heritage of India: Jainism. Cultural and Religious Heritage of India, Volume 2. New Delhi, India: Mittal. pp. 285–294. ISBN 978-8170999577. OCLC 255310797.

== See also ==
- Mikhail Konstantinovich Kudryavtsev
