= Caland system =

Word derivation rule in Proto-Indo-European

The Caland system is a set of rules in the reconstructed Proto-Indo-European language which describes how certain words, typically adjectives, are derived from one another. It was named after Dutch Indologist Willem Caland (1859–1932), who first formulated part of the system.

The cognates derived from these roots in different daughter languages often do not agree in formation, but show certain characteristic properties:

- Adjectives are formed using zero-ablaut ro-stems (i.e., word stems ending in *-rós), u-stems, or amphikinetic nt-stems.
- Adjectives are sometimes formed using i-stems, especially in the first part of a compound.
- Corresponding stative verbs *-eh₁- often exist.

== Examples ==
=== Example 1 ===
*h₁le(n)gʷʰ- 'light (in weight)':

- ro-stems: Ancient Greek elaphrós 'light, quick'; Old High German lungar 'fast'
- u-stems: Ancient Greek elakhús 'small'; Sanskrit laghú-, raghú- 'quick, light, small'; Avestan ragu- 'fast'; Latin levis 'light' < *h₁legʷʰ-us; Lithuanian lengvùs 'light'; Old Church Slavonic легъкъ (legŭkŭ) 'light'

=== Example 2 ===
*h₂erǵ- 'white':

- ro-stems: Ancient Greek argós < *argrós 'white'; Sanskrit ṛjrá- 'brilliant'
- u-stems: Tocharian B ārkwi 'white'
- i-stems: Ancient Greek argi-kéraunos 'with bright lightning'
- nt-stems: Old Irish argat, Old Welsh argant, Latin argentum

=== Example 3 ===
*h₁rewdʰ- 'red':

- ro-stems: Ancient Greek eruthrós 'red'; Latin ruber 'red'; Tocharian B ratre 'red'; Old East Slavic родръ (rodrŭ) 'red'
- i-stems: Sanskrit rudhiras (mixed with ro-stem)
- -eh₁ verbs: Latin rubeō 'be red', Old High German rōtēn 'shine red'; Old East Slavic ръдѣти сѧ (rŭděti sę) 'become red, be red'

=== Example 4 ===
*bʰerǵʰ- 'high':

- ro-stems: Tocharian B pärkare 'high'
- u-stems: Hittite parku- 'high'; Armenian barjr 'high' < *-u-
- i-stems: Avestan bǝrǝzi- 'high' in compounds
- nt-stems: Sanskrit bṛhánt- 'high', Avestan bǝrǝzant- 'high', Germanic name Burgund-, Old Irish name Brigit, Tocharian A koṃ-pärkānt 'sunrise'

=== Example 5 ===
*dʰewb- 'deep':

- ro-stems: Tocharian B tapre 'high' < *dʰub-ro-
- u-stems: Lithuanian dubùs 'hollow'
