= Indology =

Study of the history and culture of South Asia

Indology is the academic study of Indian history and culture. In modern times Indology has been largely replaced by the term "South Asian studies", to equitably cover the multiple present-day countries in South Asia, and as such is a subset of Asian studies.

The term Indology (German: Indologie) is often associated with German scholarship, and is more commonly used in German and continental European universities than in universities in the Anglosphere. In the Netherlands, the term Indologie was used to refer to the study of Indian history and culture in preparation for colonial service in the Dutch East Indies.

Some scholars have attempted to distinguish Classical Indology from Modern Indology, with classical Indology being mainly focused on the study of Sanskrit, Pāli, and Tamil literature, as well as the study of Dharmic religions such as Hinduism, Buddhism, Jainism and Sikhism, and modern Indology with its focus on contemporary India.

Some of the regional specializations under South Asian studies include:

- Bengali studies – study of culture and languages of Bengal
- Dravidian studies – study of Dravidian languages of Southern India
  - Tamilology
- Pakistan studies
- Sindhology – the study of the historical Sindh region

== History ==
=== Precursors ===
The beginnings of the study of India by travellers from outside the subcontinent date back at least to Megasthenes (c. 350–290 BC), a Greek ambassador of the Seleucids to the court of Chandragupta (ruled 322-298 BC), founder of the Mauryan Empire. Based on his life in India, Megasthenes composed a four-volume Indica, fragments of which still exist, and which influenced the classical geographers Arrian, Diodor and Strabo.

Islamic Golden Age scholar Muḥammad ibn Aḥmad Al-Biruni (973–1048) in Tarikh Al-Hind (Researches on India) recorded the political and military history of India and covered India's cultural, scientific, social and religious history in detail. He studied the anthropology of India, engaging in extensive participant observation with various Indian groups, learning their languages and studying their primary texts, and presenting his findings with objectivity and neutrality using cross-cultural comparisons.

=== Academic discipline ===
Indology as generally understood by its practitioners began in the later Early Modern period and incorporates essential features of modernity, including critical self-reflexivity, disembedding mechanisms and globalization, and the reflexive appropriation of knowledge. An important feature of Indology since its beginnings in the late eighteenth century has been the development of networks of academic communication and trust through the creation of learned societies like the Asiatic Society of Bengal, and the creation of learned journals like the Journal of the Royal Asiatic Society and Annals of the Bhandarkar Oriental Research Institute.

One of the defining features of Indology is the application of scholarly methodologies developed in European Classical Studies or "Classics" to the languages, literatures, and cultures of South Asia.

In the wake of eighteenth century pioneers like William Jones, Henry Thomas Colebrooke, Gerasim Lebedev or August Wilhelm Schlegel, Indology as an academic subject emerged in the nineteenth century, in the context of British India, together with Asian studies in general affected by the romantic Orientalism of the time. The Asiatic Society was founded in Calcutta in 1784, Société Asiatique founded in 1822, the Royal Asiatic Society in 1824, the American Oriental Society in 1842, and the German Oriental Society (Deutsche Morgenländische Gesellschaft) in 1845, the Japanese Association of Indian and Buddhist Studies in 1949.

Sanskrit literature included many pre-modern dictionaries, especially the Nāmaliṅgānuśāsana of Amarasiṃha, but a milestone in the Indological study of Sanskrit literature was publication of the St. Petersburg Sanskrit-Wörterbuch during the 1850s to 1870s. Translations of major Hindu texts in the Sacred Books of the East began in 1879. Otto von Böhtlingk's edition of Pāṇini's grammar appeared in 1887. Max Müller's edition of the Rigveda appeared in 1849–1875. Albrecht Weber commenced publishing his pathbreaking journal Indologische Studien in 1849, and in 1897 Sergey Oldenburg launched a systematic edition of key Sanskrit texts, "Bibliotheca Buddhica".

== Professional literature and associations ==
Indologists typically attend conferences such as the American Association of Asian Studies, the American Oriental Society annual conference, the World Sanskrit Conference, and national-level meetings in the UK, Germany, India, Japan, France and elsewhere.

They may routinely read and write in journals such as Indo-Iranian Journal, Journal of the Royal Asiatic Society, Journal of the American Oriental Society, Journal asiatique, the Journal of the German Oriental Society (ZDMG), Wiener Zeitschrift für die Kunde Südasiens, Journal of Indian Philosophy, Bhandarkar Oriental Research Institute, Journal of Indian and Buddhist Studies (Indogaku Bukkyogaku Kenkyu), Bulletin de l'École française d'Extrême Orient, and others.

They may be members of such professional bodies as the American Oriental Society, the Royal Asiatic Society of Great Britain and Ireland, the Société Asiatique, the Deutsche Morgenlāndische Gesellschaft and others.

== List of indologists ==
The following is a list of prominent academically qualified Indologists.

=== Historical scholars ===
- Megasthenes (350–290 BC)
- Faxian (337-422)
- Xuanzang (602-664)
- Al-Biruni (973–1050)
- Gaston-Laurent Cœurdoux (1691–1779)
- Anquetil Duperron (1731–1805)
- William Jones (1746–1794)
- Charles Wilkins (1749–1836)
- Colin Mackenzie (1753–1821)
- Dimitrios Galanos (1760–1833)
- Henry Thomas Colebrooke (1765–1837)
- Jean-Antoine Dubois (1765–1848)
- August Wilhelm Schlegel (1767–1845)
- James Mill (1773–1836)
- Horace Hayman Wilson (1786–1860)
- Franz Bopp (1791–1867)
- Duncan Forbes (linguist) (1798–1868)
- James Prinsep (1799–1840)
- Hermann Grassmann (1809–1877)
- John Muir (indologist) (1810–1882)
- Edward Balfour (1813–1889)
- Robert Caldwell (1814–1891)
- Alexander Cunningham (1814–1893)
- Hermann Gundert (1814–1893)
- Otto von Bohtlingk (1815–1904)
- Monier Monier-Williams (1819–1899)
- Henry Yule (1820–1889)
- Rudolf Roth (1821–1893)
- Theodor Aufrecht (1822–1907)
- Max Müller (1823–1900)
- Albrecht Weber (1825–1901)
- Ralph T. H. Griffith (1826–1906)
- William Dwight Whitney (1827–1894)
- Ferdinand Kittel (1832–1903)
- Edwin Arnold (1832–1904)
- Johan Hendrik Caspar Kern (1833–1917)
- Gustav Solomon Oppert (1836–1908)
- Georg Bühler (1837–1898)
- Chintaman Vinayak Vaidya (1861–1938)
- Ramakrishna Gopal Bhandarkar (1837–1925)
- Arthur Coke Burnell (1840–1882)
- Julius Eggeling (1842–1918)
- Paul Deussen (1845–1919)
- Vincent Arthur Smith (1848–1920)
- James Darmesteter (1849–1894)
- Hermann Jacobi (1850–1937)
- Kashinath Trimbak Telang (1850–1893)
- Alois Anton Führer (1853–1930)
- Jacob Wackernagel (1853–1938)
- Arthur Anthony Macdonell (1854–1930)
- Hermann Oldenberg (1854–1920)
- Maurice Bloomfield (1855–1928)
- E. Hultzsch (1857–1927)
- Mark Aurel Stein (1862–1943)
- P. T. Srinivasa Iyengar(1863–1931)
- Moriz Winternitz (1863–1937)
- Fyodor Shcherbatskoy (1866–1942)
- F.W. Thomas (1867–1956)
- Jadunath Sarkar (1870–1958)
- S. Krishnaswami Aiyangar (1871–1947)
- Percy Brown (1872–1955)
- John Hubert Marshall (1876–1958)
- Arthur W. Ryder (1877-1938)
- Arthur Berriedale Keith (1879–1944)
- Pandurang Vaman Kane (1880–1972)
- Pierre Johanns (1882–1955)
- Andrzej Gawronski (1885–1927)
- Willibald Kirfel (1885–1964)
- Johannes Nobel (1887–1960)
- Betty Heimann (1888–1961)
- Alice Boner (1889–1981)
- Heinrich Zimmer (1890–1943)
- Ervin Baktay (1890–1963)
- Mortimer Wheeler (1890–1976)
- B. R. Ambedkar (1891–1956)
- K. A. Nilakanta Sastri (1892–1975)
- Mahapandit Rahul Sankrityayan (1893–1963)
- Vasudev Vishnu Mirashi (1893–1985)
- V. R. Ramachandra Dikshitar (1896–1953)
- Dasharatha Sharma (1903–1976)
- S. Srikanta Sastri (1904–1974)
- Joseph Campbell (1904–1987)
- Murray Barnson Emeneau (1904–2005)
- Jan Gonda (1905–1991)
- Paul Thieme (1905–2001)
- Jean Filliozat (1906–1982)
- Alain Danielou (1907–1994)
- F B J Kuiper (1907–2003)
- Thomas Burrow (1909–1986)
- Jagdish Chandra Jain (1909–1993)
- Ramchandra Narayan Dandekar (1909–2001)
- Arthur Llewellyn Basham (1914–1986)
- Richard De Smet (1916–1997)
- Ahmad Hasan Dani (1920–2009)
- Frank-Richard Hamm (1920–1973)
- Madeleine Biardeau (1922–2010)
- V. S. Pathak (1926–2003)
- Kamil Zvelebil (1927–2009)
- J. A. B. van Buitenen (1928–1979)
- Tatyana Elizarenkova (1929–2007)
- Bettina Baumer (1940–)
- Anncharlott Eschmann (1941–1977)
- William Dalrymple (1965–present)
- Arvind Sharma (1940–present)
- Harilal Dhruv (1856–1896)
- Ram Swarup (1920–1998)
- Mikhail Konstantinovich Kudryavtsev (1911–1992)
- Daniel H. H. Ingalls, Sr. (1916–1999), Wales Professor of Sanskrit, Harvard University
- Sita Ram Goel (1921–2003)
- Natalya Romanovna Guseva (1914–2010)
- Ram Sharan Sharma (1919–2011), Founding Chairperson of Indian Council of Historical Research; Professor Emeritus, Patna University
- Bhadriraju Krishnamurti (1928–2012), Osmania University
- Fida Hassnain (1924–2016) Sri Pratap College, Srinagar
- Heinrich von Stietencron (1933–2018), University of Tübingen, Germany
- Iravatham Mahadevan (1930–2018)- Indian Council of Historical Research
- Stanley Wolpert (1927–2019)- University of California, Los Angeles (emeritus)
- Karel Werner (1925–2019)
- Dietmar Rothermund (1933–2020), Professor of the history of South Asia at the Ruprecht-Karls University in Heidelberg
- Bannanje Govindacharya (1936–2020), scholar in Tatva-vada school of philosophy and Vedic tradition
- Stanley Insler (1937–2019), Edward E. Salisbury Professor of Sanskrit and Comparative Philology, Yale University
- Gérard Fussman (1940–2022) Collège de France

=== Contemporary scholars with university posts ===
- Romila Thapar (1931–present), Professor of Ancient History, emerita, at the Jawaharlal Nehru University
- Hermann Kulke (1938–present), Professor of South and Southeast Asian history at the Department of History, Kiel University
- Asko Parpola (1941–present), professor emeritus of Indology and South Asian Studies at the University of Helsinki
- Patrick Olivelle (1942–present) Professor Emeritus of Asian Studies at the University of Texas at Austin
- Michael Witzel (1943–present)- Wales Professor of Sanskrit at Harvard University
- Ronald Inden- Professor Emeritus of History, South Asian Languages and Civilizations at the University of Chicago
- George L. Hart (1945–present)- Professor Emeritus of Tamil at the University of California, Berkeley
- Stephanie Jamison (1948–present), Distinguished Professor of Asian Languages and Cultures and of Indo-European Studies at the University of California, Los Angeles
- Alexis Sanderson (1948–present) Emeritus Fellow and former Spalding Professor of Eastern Religion and Ethics at All Souls College, Oxford
- Michael D. Willis (The British Museum)
- Wendy Doniger (1940–present) University of Chicago Divinity School, as Mircea Eliade Distinguished Service Professor of the History of Religions
- Thomas Trautmann (1940–present), former Head of the Center for South Asian Studies, University of Michigan
- Kapil Kapoor (1940–present), scholar of English Literature, Linguistics, Paninan Grammar, Sanskrit Arts and Aesthetics, Director of Indian Institute of Advanced Studies, Shimla
- Shrivatsa Goswami (1950–present), Indian scholar of Hindu philosophy and art at (Banaras Hindu University), as well as Gaudiya Vaishnava religious leader.
- Edwin Bryant (1957–present) Rutgers University, New Jersey
- Madhav M. Deshpande, University of Michigan
- Diwakar Acharya, University of Oxford

=== Other indologists ===
- Michel Danino, French-Indian author and historical negationist
- Georg Feuerstein
- Hans T. Bakker

== Organizations ==
- Adyar Library and Research Centre, Chennai
- American Institute of Indian Studies, Chicago
- The Asiatic Society, Kolkata
- Royal Asiatic Society of Great Britain and Ireland
- The Asiatic Society of Mumbai, Mumbai
- Bhandarkar Oriental Research Institute, Pune
- The K. R. Cama Oriental Institute, Mumbai
- French Institute of Pondicherry, Puduchery
- The Kuppuswami Sastri Research Institute, Chennai
- Lalbhai Dalpatbhai Institute of Indology along with Lalbhai Dalpatbhai Museum which is adjacent to the institute, Ahmedabad, Gujarat, India
- Madras Literary Society, Chennai
- Oriental Research Institute Mysore, Mysuru
- Oriental Research Institute & Manuscripts Library, Thiruvananthapuram
- The Oxford Centre For Hindu Studies
- The C. P. Ramaswami Aiyar Foundation, Chennai
- Roja Muthiah Research Library, Chennai

== See also ==
- Buddhist studies
- Greater India
- Hindu studies
- Indianisation
- Indomania
- Indosphere
- Indo-Aryan languages
- Romani studies
- Sanskrit studies
- Sikh studies
