= List of LGBTQ holders of political offices in the Netherlands =

LGBTQ (Lesbian, Gay, Bisexual, Transgender and Queer) holders of political offices in the Netherlands.

== Cabinet ==
=== Jetten cabinet ===
- Rob Jetten (D66)
  - Minister for Climate and Energy Policy (2022–2024; Fourth Rutte cabinet)
  - Prime Minister (since 2026)
- Sophie Hermans (VVD)
  - Second Deputy Prime Minister (2024–2025), First Deputy Prime Minister of the Netherlands (2025–2026; Schoof cabinet)
  - Acting Minister of Education, acting Minister of Infrastructure and Water Management (2025; Schoof cabinet)
  - Minister of Climate and Green Growth (2024–2026; Schoof cabinet)
  - Minister of Health, Welfare and Sport (since 2026)

=== Former ===
- Hein Vos (PvdA)
  - Minister of Commerce and Industry (1945–1946)
  - Minister of Transport (1946–1947)
  - Minister of Public Works and Reconstruction (1946–1947)
  - Minister of Transport and Water Management (1947–1948)
- Ien Dales (PvdA)
  - State Secretary of Social Affairs and Employment (1981–1982)
  - Minister of the Interior (1989–1994)
- Joop Wijn (CDA)
  - State Secretary of Economic Affairs (2002–2003)
  - State Secretary of Finance (2003–2006)
  - Minister of Economic Affairs (2006–2007)
- Gerda Verburg (CDA)
  - Minister of Agriculture, Nature and Food Quality (2007–2010)
- Jan Kees de Jager (CDA)
  - State Secretary of Finance (2007–2010)
  - Minister of Finance (2010–2012)
- Mark Harbers (VVD)
  - State Secretary of Justice and Security (2017–2019)
  - Minister of Infrastructure and Water Management (2022–2024)
- Kajsa Ollongren (D66)
  - Deputy Prime Minister (2017-2022)
  - Minister of the Interior and Kingdom Relations (2017-2022)
  - Minister of Defence (2022–2024)
- Hanke Bruins Slot (CDA)
  - Minister of the Interior and Kingdom Relations (2022–2023)
  - Minister of Foreign Affairs of the Netherlands (2023–2024)
- Eddie van Marum (BBB)
  - State Secretary for Reparations for Groningen (2024–2025)
  - State Secretary for Digitalisation, Kingdom Relations, and Reparations for Groningen (2025–2026)
- Jean Rummenie (BBB)
  - State Secretary for Fisheries, Food Security and Nature (2024–2026)

== States General ==
=== Current ===
- House of Representatives
  - Thom van Campen – VVD (since 2021)
    - Speaker of the House (since 2025)
  - Ines Kostić – PvdD (since 2023)
  - Marijke Synhaeve – D66 (since 2023)
  - Robert van Asten – D66 (since 2025)
  - Ranjith Clemminck-Croci – JA21 (since 2025)
- Senate
  - Boris Dittrich – D66 (since 2019)
  - Eric Holterhues – CU (since 2023)

=== Former ===
- House of Representatives
  - Hein Vos – SDAP, PvdA (1937–1945, 1946, 1948)
  - Coos Huijsen – CHU (1972, 1976–1977)
  - Peter Lankhorst – PPR, GL (1981–1994)
  - Jan Franssen – VVD (1982–1994)
  - Ien Dales – PvdA (1982–1987)
  - Evelien Eshuis – CPN (1982–1986)
  - Wim van de Camp – CDA (1986–2009)
  - Anne Lize van der Stoel – VVD (1994–1998)
  - Clemens Cornielje – VVD (1994–2005)
  - Boris Dittrich – D66 (1994–2006)
  - Peter Rehwinkel – PvdA (1995–2002, 2002)
  - Gerda Verburg – CDA (1998–2007, 2010–2011)
  - Joop Wijn – CDA (1998–2002, 2003, 2006–2007)
  - Matthieu Heemelaar – GL (2009)
  - Krista van Velzen – SP (2002–2010)
  - Jan Kees de Jager – CDA (2010)
  - Boris van der Ham – D66 (2002–2012)
  - Ger Koopmans – CDA (2002–2012)
  - Tofik Dibi – GL (2006–2012)
  - Sjoerd Potters – VVD (2012–2017)
  - Astrid Oosenbrug – PvdA (2012-2017)
  - Henk Krol – 50PLUS (2012–2013, 2014–2021)
  - Henk Nijboer – PvdA (2012–2023)
  - Vera Bergkamp – D66 (2012–2023)
    - Speaker of the House (2021–2023)
  - Eric Smaling – SP (2013–2017)
  - Frank Wassenberg – PvdD (2015–2016, 2017–2023)
  - Tom van den Nieuwenhuijzen – GL (2020–2021)
  - Raoul Boucke – D66 (2021–2023)
  - Alexander Hammelburg – D66 (2021–2023)
  - Lisa van Ginneken – D66 (2021–2023)
  - Jacqueline van den Hil – VVD (2021–2023, 2023)
  - Mark Strolenberg – VVD (2021–2023)
  - Carline van Breugel – D66 (2023)
  - Marieke Koekkoek – Volt (2021–2025)
  - Geert Gabriëls – GL–PvdA (2023–2025)
  - Rob Jetten – D66 (2017–2022, 2023–2026)
- Senate
  - Hein Vos – PvdA (1956–1968)
  - Herman Tjeenk Willink – PvdA (1987–1997)
    - President of the Senate (1991–1997)
  - Annemarie Grewel – PvdA (1995–1998)
  - Bob van Schijndel – GL (1999–2003)
  - Eric Smaling – SP (2007–2013)
  - Peter Rehwinkel – PvdA (2007–2009)
  - Ruard Ganzevoort – GL (2011–2023)

== European Parliament ==
=== Current ===
- Kim van Sparrentak – GL (since 2019)

=== Former ===
- Herman Verbeek – PPR (1984–1986), GL (1989–1994)
- Dennis de Jong – SP (2009-2019)
- Wim van de Camp – CDA (2009-2019)

== Council of State ==
=== Current ===
- Jan Franssen – VVD (since 2014)

=== Former ===
- Hein Vos – PvdA (1968–1972)
- Herman Tjeenk Willink – PvdA (1997–2012)
  - Vice-President (1997–2012)

== Ministers of State ==
=== Current ===
- Herman Tjeenk Willink – PvdA

== King's and Queen's Commissioners ==
=== Current ===
- Arno Brok (VVD)
  - Friesland (since 2017)

=== Former ===
- Jan Franssen (VVD)
  - South Holland (2000–2013)
- Clemens Cornielje (VVD)
  - Gelderland (2005–2019)

== Mayors ==
=== Current ===
- Jaap Nawijn (VVD)
  - Ouder-Amstel (2003–2007)
  - Heemskerk (2007–2012)
  - Hollands Kroon (since 2012)
- Frans Buijserd (CDA)
  - Aalburg (2003–2007)
  - Nieuwkoop (since 2007)
- Toon Mans (VVD)
  - Hillegom (2003–2011)
  - Castricum (since 2011)
- Peter Rehwinkel (PvdA)
  - Naarden (2004–2009)
  - Groningen (2009–2013)
  - Zaltbommel (since 2017)
- Roland van Benthem (VVD)
  - Eemnes (since 2005)
- Sjoerd Potters (VVD)
  - De Bilt (since 2017)
- Joris Bengevoord (GL)
  - Winterswijk (since 2017)

=== Former ===
- Ien Dales (PvdA)
  - Nijmegen (1987–1989)
- Ton Jansen (PvdA)
  - Neerijnen (1988–2005)
- Jan Franssen (VVD)
  - Zwolle (1994–2000)
- Arno Brok (VVD)
  - Sneek (2003–2010)
  - Dordrecht (2010–2017)
- Geert Dales (VVD)
  - Leeuwarden (2004–2007)
- Anne Lize van der Stoel (VVD)
  - Teylingen (2013–2014)
- Ger Koopmans (CDA)
  - Stein (2013)
- Kajsa Ollongren (D66)
  - Amsterdam (2017)
- Onno Hoes (VVD)
  - Maastricht (2010–2015)
  - Haarlemmermeer (2017-2019, acting)
  - Roermond (2022–2023, acting)
  - Tilburg (2025–2026, acting)

== Party leaders ==
=== Current ===
- Rob Jetten - D66 (2018–2020, since 2023)

=== Former ===
- Peter Lankhorst – GL (1993–1994)
- Pim Fortuyn – LN (2001–2002), LPF (2002)
- Boris Dittrich – D66 (2003–2006)
- Henk Krol – 50PLUS (2012–2013, 2016–2020)

== Party chairs ==
=== Former ===
- Hein Vos – PvdA (1953–1955, 1960–1961)
- Herman Verbeek – PPR (1977–1981)
- Pim Fortuyn – LPF (2002)
- Herman Meijer – GL (2003–2006)
- Heleen Weening – GL (2012)

== Party Board Members/Political Consultants ==
- Alfred Vierling – CP, CD
- Ed Sinke – VVD
- Frits Huffnagel – VVD
- Bastiaan Meijer – SP

== See also ==
- List of the first LGBT holders of political offices
- List of lesbian, gay, bisexual, or transgender firsts by year
