= Hein Vos =

Dutch politician and economist (1903–1972)

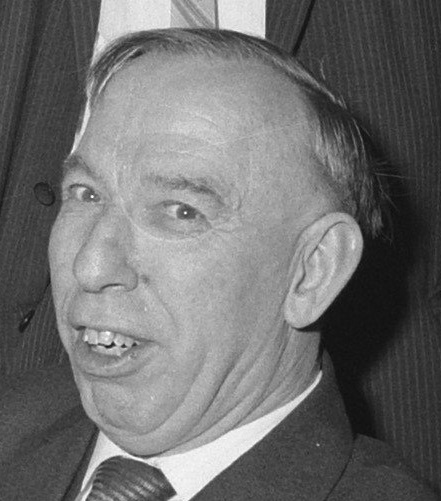
- Hein Vos in 1961

Member of the Council of State
- In office 21 February 1968 – 23 April 1972
- Vice President: Louis Beel

Parliamentary leader in the Senate
- In office 15 November 1960 – 16 February 1968
- Preceded by: Joris in 't Veld
- Succeeded by: Maarten de Niet Gerritzoon
- Parliamentary group: Labour Party

Member of the Senate
- In office 6 November 1956 – 16 February 1968

Chairman of the Labour Party
- In office 10 May 1960 – 24 March 1961; Ad interim
- Leader: Jaap Burger
- Preceded by: Evert Vermeer
- Succeeded by: Ko Suurhoff
- In office 5 June 1953 – 23 February 1955
- Leader: Willem Drees
- Preceded by: Koos Vorrink
- Succeeded by: Evert Vermeer

Member of the Social and Economic Council
- In office 1 June 1950 – 21 February 1968
- Chairman: See list: Frans de Vries (1950–1958) Gerard Verrijn Stuart (1958–1964) Jan de Pous (1964–1968)

Minister of Transport and Water Management
- In office 1 March 1947 – 7 August 1948
- Prime Minister: Louis Beel
- Preceded by: Himself as Minister of Transport
- Succeeded by: Josef van Schaik (ad interim)

Minister of Public Works and Reconstruction
- In office 15 November 1946 – 3 March 1947; Ad interim
- Prime Minister: Louis Beel
- Preceded by: Johan Ringers
- Succeeded by: Lambertus Neher as Minister of Reconstruction and Housing

Minister of Transport
- In office 3 July 1946 – 1 March 1947
- Prime Minister: Louis Beel
- Preceded by: Steef van Schaik as Minister of Transport and Energy
- Succeeded by: Himself as Minister of Transport and Water Management

Minister of Commerce and Industry
- In office 25 June 1945 – 3 July 1946
- Prime Minister: Willem Schermerhorn
- Preceded by: Hans Gispen as Minister of Commerce, Industry and Agriculture
- Succeeded by: Gerardus Huysmans as Minister of Economic Affairs

Member of the House of Representatives
- In office 27 July 1948 – 16 December 1948
- In office 4 June 1946 – 9 July 1946
- In office 8 June 1937 – 25 June 1945

Personal details
- Born: Hendrik Vos; 5 July 1903 Tijnje, Netherlands
- Died: April 23, 1972 (aged 68) Wassenaar, Netherlands
- Party: Labour Party (from 1946)
- Other political affiliations: Social Democratic Workers' Party (1923–1946)
- Domestic partner(s): Aar van de Werfhorst (1945–1972)
- Education: Delft Institute of Technology (Bachelor of Engineering, Master of Engineering)
- Occupation: Politician · Civil servant · Economist · Civil engineer · Researcher · Businessman · Corporate director · Nonprofit director · Trade Union leader · Media administrator · Editor · Author

Hendrik "Hein" Vos (5 July 1903 – 23 April 1972) was a Dutch politician of the Social Democratic Workers' Party (SDAP) and later the Labour Party (PvdA) and economist.

== Biography ==
Vos attended a gymnasium in Heerenveen from April 1917 until May 1921 and applied at the Delft Institute of Technology in June 1921, majoring in Electrical engineering and obtaining a Bachelor of Engineering degree in June 1923 before graduating with a Master of Engineering degree in July 1927. Vos worked as a civil servant for the municipality of Deventer from July 1927 until September 1928 and for the Netherlands Patent Office of the Ministry of Economic Affairs from September 1928 until July 1934. Vos served on the municipal council of Rijswijk from 1 September 1931 until 22 July 1934. Vos worked as a trade union leader for the Dutch Confederation of Trade Unions (NVV) from July 1934 until 8 June 1937 and as the director of the Social Democratic Workers' Party think tank from July 1934 until May 1940. Vos also served as editor-in-chief of the party newspaper Vrijheid, Arbeid en Brood from June 1935 until May 1940. Vos served on the municipal council of Amsterdam from 3 September 1935 until 5 September 1939.

Vos was elected to the House of Representatives in the 1937 general election, taking office on 8 June 1937 serving as a frontbencher and spokesperson for economic affairs. On 10 May 1940 Nazi Germany invaded the Netherlands and the government fled to London to escape the German occupation. During the German occupation Vos continued to serve as a Member of the House of Representatives in name only but in reality the de facto political influence of the House of Representatives was marginalized by the German occupation authority.

Following the end of World War II, Queen Wilhelmina ordered the formation of a national unity government to serve in a caretaker capacity until the new election, with Vos appointed as Minister of Commerce and Industry in the Schermerhorn–Drees cabinet, taking office on 25 June 1945. On 9 February 1946, the Social Democratic Workers' Party (SDAP), the Free-thinking Democratic League (VDB) and the Christian Democratic Union (CDU) chose to merge to form the Labour Party (PvdA). After the 1946 general election, Vos returned to the House of Representatives, taking office on 4 June 1946. Following the 1946 cabinet formation, he was appointed as Minister of Transport in the Beel I cabinet, taking office on 3 July 1946. Vos served as acting Minister of Public Works and Reconstruction from 15 November 1946 until 3 March 1947 following the resignation Johan Ringers. On 1 March 1947 the Minister of Transport was renamed as the Minister of Transport and Water Management. After the 1948 general election of, Vos again returned to the House of Representatives, taking office on 27 July 1948. Following the 1948 cabinet formation, Vos was not giving a cabinet post in the new cabinet; the Beel I cabinet was replaced by the Drees–Van Schaik cabinet on 7 August 1948 and Vos continued to serve in the House of Representatives as a frontbencher and spokesperson for economic affairs and small business.

In December 1948 Vos was named as chief executive officer (CEO) of the insurance company NV Centrale Algemene Levensverzekeringsmaatschappij, he resigned from the House of Representatives on 16 December 1948 and was installed as CEO on 1 January 1949. Vos remained in active in national politics, he served as Chairman of the Labour Party from 5 June 1953 until 23 February 1955. Vos was elected to the Senate in the 1956 Senate election, taking office on 6 November 1956 serving as a frontbencher and spokesperson for finances and agriculture. After the 1960 Senate election, Vos was selected as parliamentary leader of the Labour Party, taking office on 15 November 1960. In February 1968 Vos was nominated as a member of the Council of State; he resigned as parliamentary leader and member of the Senate on 16 February 1968 and was installed as a member of the Council of State on 21 February 1968.

Vos was known for his abilities as a manager and "policy wonk". He holds the distinction as the first known LGBT member of the House of Representatives and government minister of the Netherlands, this fact was an open secret in Dutch politics at that time.

== Decorations ==
Honours
Ribbon bar	Honour	Country	Date	Comment
	Knight of the Order of the Netherlands Lion	Netherlands	31 August 1948	
	Commander of the Order of Orange-Nassau	Netherlands	30 April 1964	

Party political offices
Preceded by Koos Vorrink	Chairman of the Labour Party; 1953–1955	Succeeded by Evert Vermeer
Preceded by Evert Vermeer	Chairman of the Labour Party; 1960–1961; Ad interim	Succeeded by Ko Suurhoff
Preceded by Joris in 't Veld	Parliamentary leader of the Labour Party in the Senate; 1960–1968	Succeeded by Maarten de Niet Gerritzoon
Political offices
Preceded by Hans Gispen as Minister of Commerce, Industry and Agriculture	Minister of Commerce and Industry; 1945–1946	Succeeded by Gerardus Huysmans as Minister of Economic Affairs
Preceded by Steef van Schaik as Minister of Transport and Energy	Minister of Transport; 1946–1947	Succeeded by Himself as Minister of Transport and Water Management
Preceded by Johan Ringers	Minister of Public Works and Reconstruction; Ad interim 1946–1947	Succeeded by Lambertus Neher as Minister of Reconstruction and Housing
Preceded by Himself as as Minister of Transport	Minister of Transport and Water Management; 1947–1948	Succeeded by Josef van Schaik; Ad interim
Civic offices
Preceded by Louis Regout Jr.	Vice Chairman of the Mijnraad; 1948–1956	Unknown
Business positions
Unknown	CEO and Chairman of the De Centrale; 1949–1968	Unknown
Non-profit organization positions
Preceded by Nicolaas Wilhelmus; Posthumus	Chairman of the Supervisory board of the International Institute of Social History; 1950–1968	Unknown
Media offices
Unknown	Chairman of the Supervisory board of Vrij Nederland; 1948–1956	Unknown
