= Slotlaan metro station =

Metro station in Capelle aan den IJssel, Netherlands

Slotlaan
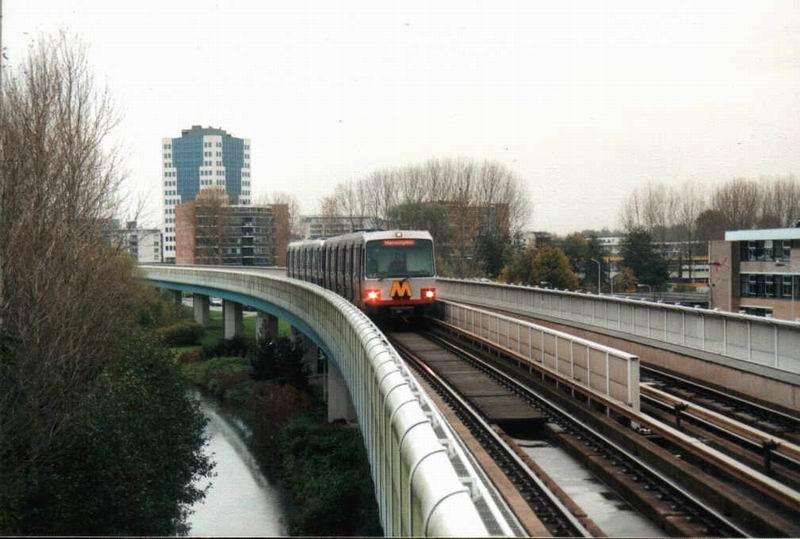
- Metro train approaching Slotlaan station

General information
- Coordinates: 51°55′42.61″N 4°34′42.54″E
- System: Rotterdam Metro station
- Owner: RET
- Platforms: Side platforms
- Tracks: 2

History
- Opened: 1994

Services
Preceding station	Rotterdam Metro	Following station
Capelsebrug towards De Akkers	Line C	Capelle Centrum towards De Terp
Location

Slotlaan is an elevated station on Line C of the Rotterdam Metro and is situated in the town of Capelle aan den IJssel, just east of Rotterdam. The station was opened on 26 May 1994 as part of the extension of the East-West Line or Caland Line from Capelsebrug station towards De Terp station. The station consists of two tracks with a platform on both sides. Near the station is the Comenius College middle school from Capelle aan den IJssel.

== Track Layout ==
- Side Platforms
- Track 1- De Terp Operator Line C
- Track 2- De Akkers Operator Line C
