= Capelle train accident =

1899 accident in the Netherlands

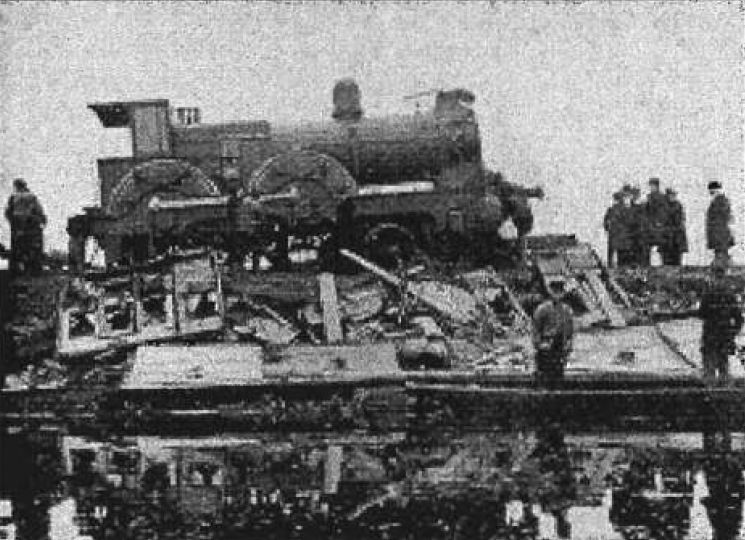
- Locomotive from the accident in 1899

- Location within Netherlands

Details
- Date: 15 November 1899
- Location: Capelle aan den IJssel, Netherlands
- Coordinates: 51°56′13″N 4°35′24″E
- Country: Netherlands
- Line: Rotterdam – Gouda
- Incident type: Head-on Collision
- Cause: Signal passed at danger in a Heavy Fog

Statistics
- Trains: 2
- Deaths: 8
- Injured: 12 (Severely)

The Capelle train accident took place on 15 November 1899 in Capelle aan den IJssel, Netherlands, when a mail train collided with a passenger train in a heavy fog, resulting in the deaths of 8 people with a further 12 injured. It is the deadliest train accident in the Netherlands in the 19th century.

== Accident ==
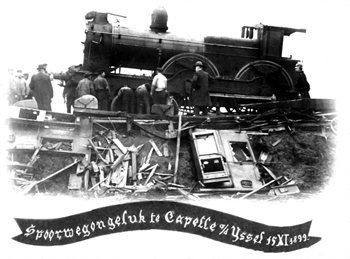
Train wreck at Capelle aan den IJssel on 15 November 1899

Passenger train number 60 was on route from Rotterdam to Gouda on 15 November 1899 when a heavy fog rolled in, causing the operator of train 60 to halt his train near the station of Capelle aan den IJssel. As station personnel was conversing with the crew of train 60, the mail train (80bis) from Vlissingen sped towards them, having run a red light which was hidden in the fog that indicated the presence of train 60 on the tracks. Station personnel quickly blew on their whistles to alert the oncoming train of the imminent danger. The crew of train 80bis heard the signals and quickly applied their brakes, however the wet tracks caused the train to continue sliding at a high speed. Causing the train to plow into the rear carriages of train 60 at 8 am, crushing the last and damaging a second. The locomotive of 80bis derailed along with the luggage wagon of train 60, which had been pushed 15 meters forward by the force of the collision.

== Rescue effort ==
Five people in the rear wagon of train 60 were killed on impact, with a further 15 severely injured. Mayor Dirk Bakker led the first rescue effort shortly after the disaster, and gathered all the doctors from Capelle aan den IJssel to aid the victims. Uninjured passengers and local inhabitants also tended to the injured and those still trapped in the wreckage of train 60. Special trains were assembled that send the injured to Rotterdam for treatment, which arrived by 10 am.

== Aftermath ==
Four men and a 7-year-old girl were killed instantly in the collision. A woman died of her injuries as she was transported to Rotterdam, where the young girl's father also died that same day from his injuries. An eighth victim, a man, died from his injuries the following day, bringing the total amount of lives lost to 8. Another 12 people were seriously wounded and some of them spent up to a year in hospital. Among the injured was also a fireman who had only a few months prior survived the deadly Vlissingen train accident.

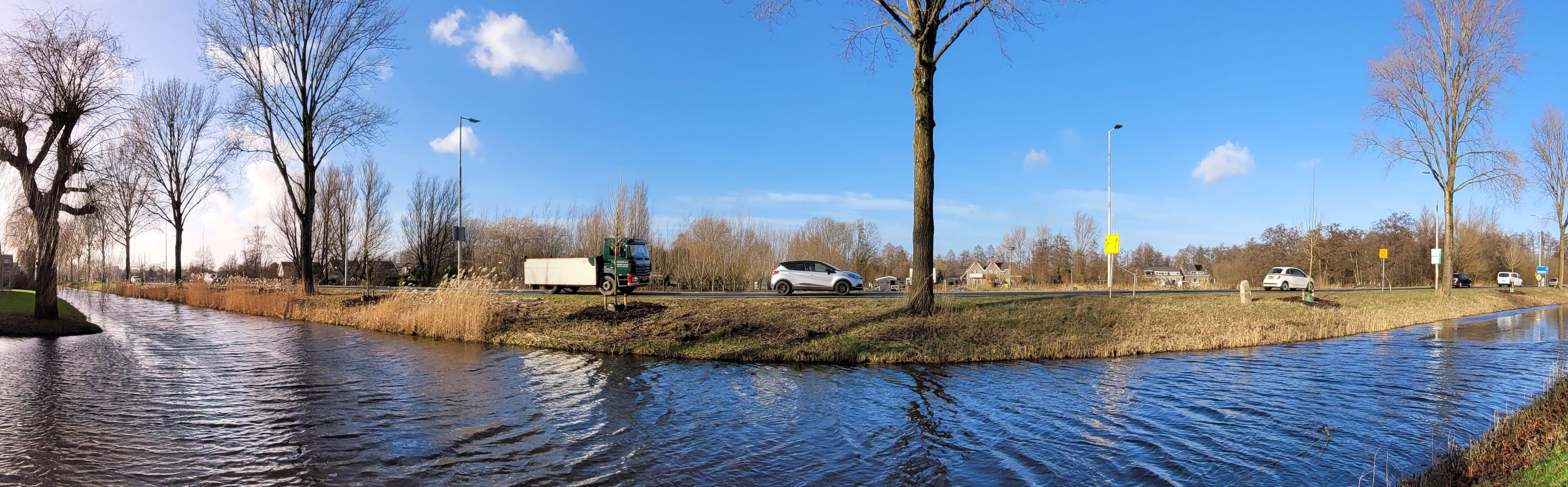
The location of the accident in 2024

In the afternoon of 15 November 1899, two trains with workers from Rotterdam arrived at the scene of the disaster. Cleaning up the wreckage and repairing the slightly damaged track. The repair and clean-up works were completed by 11 pm and the train traffic ran as scheduled again.

== Gallery ==
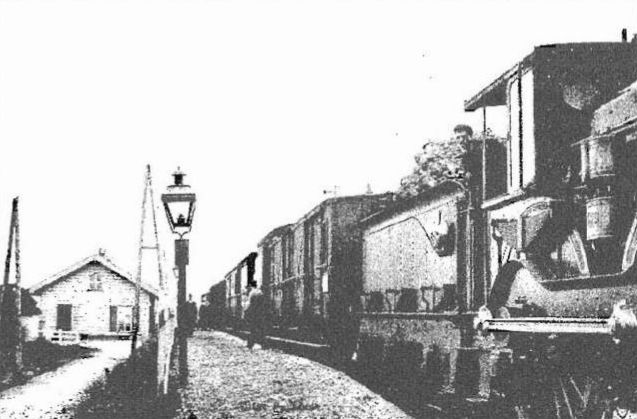
The first train station of Capelle aan den IJssel, the accident happened a few dozen meters from its location

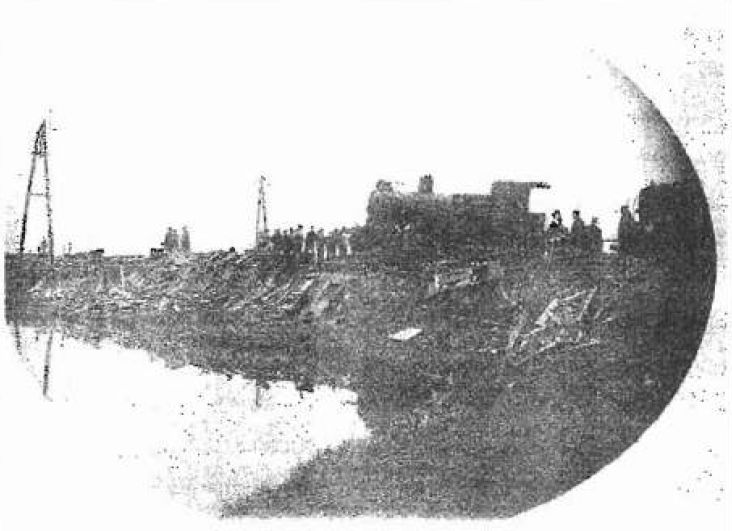
Disaster area seen from the land behind the 's-Gravenweg

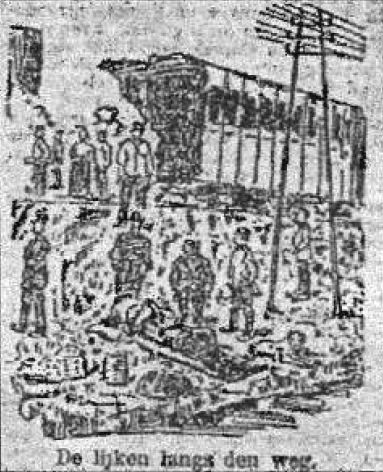
De lijken langs den weg. - Bodies next to the road

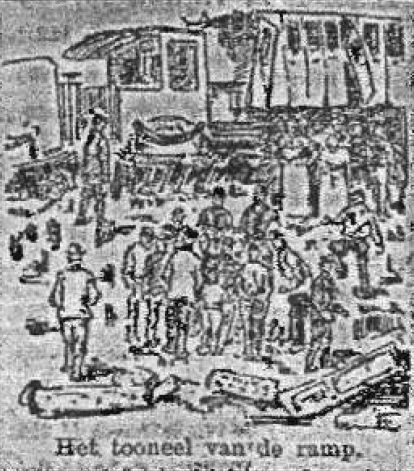
Het tooneel van de ramp. - The stage of the disaster

== See also ==
- List of rail accidents in the Netherlands
