= Habtamu de Hoop =

Dutch television presenter and politician (born 1998)

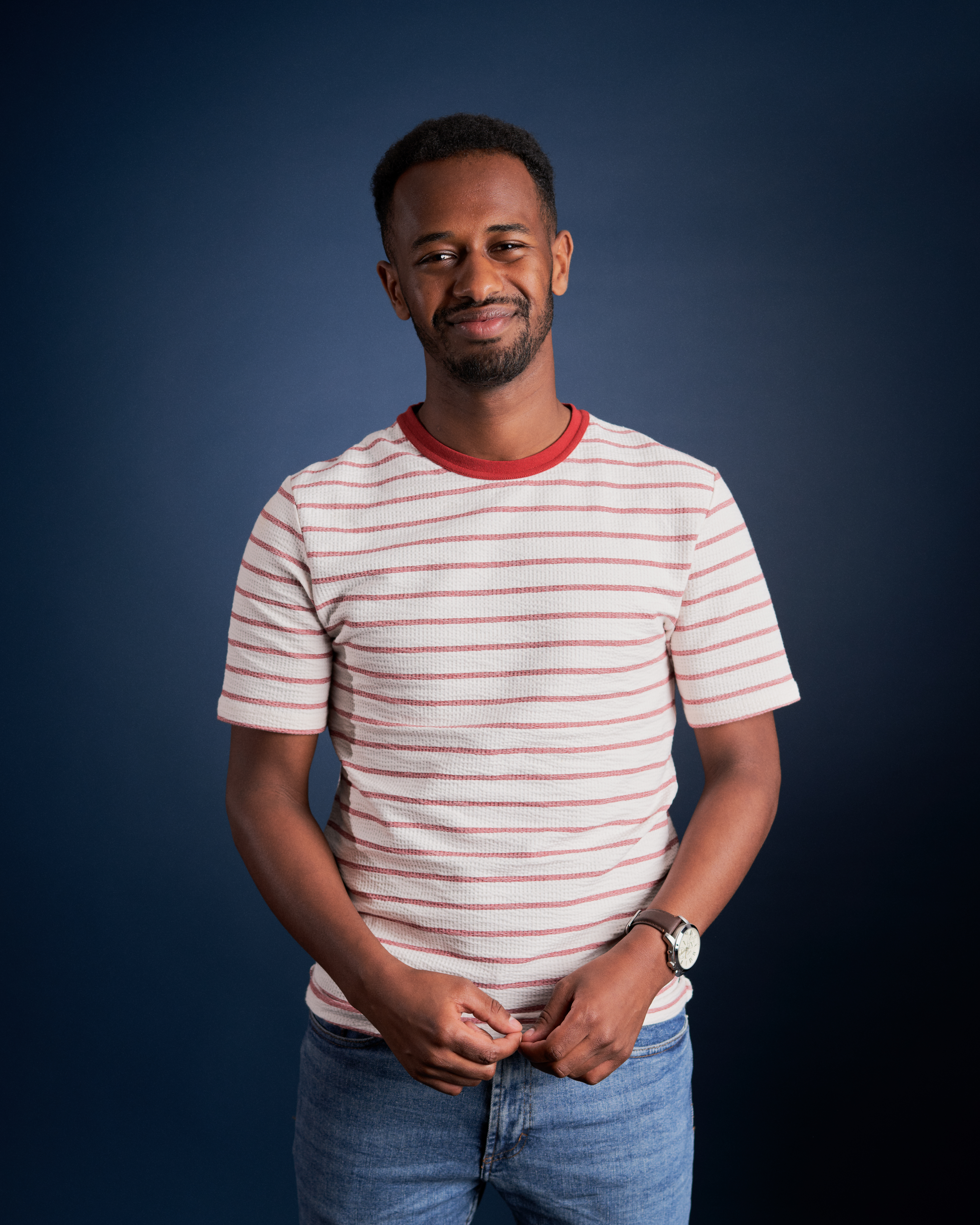

Member of the House of Representatives
- Incumbent
- Assumed office 31 March 2021

Member of the Southwest-Friesland Municipal Council
- In office 2 January 2018 – 29 April 2021
- Succeeded by: Pieter Jan Scholtanus

Personal details
- Born: 1998 (age 27–28) Addis Ababa, Ethiopia
- Party: Labour Party (until 2026); PRO (since 2026)
- Education: Windesheim University of Applied Sciences; NHL Stenden University of Applied Sciences

Habtamu Emke de Hoop (born 1998) is an Ethiopian-born Dutch television presenter and politician. He served as a member of the municipal council of Súdwest-Fryslân from 2018 to 2021, also hosting the educational children's show Het Klokhuis from 2018 to 2019. De Hoop was elected to the House of Representatives in the 2021 general election as a member of Progressief Nederland (PRO), and formerly of the Labour Party (PvdA).

== Early life and education ==
He was born in 1998 in the Ethiopian capital Addis Ababa and was abandoned at a bar when he was a few months old. De Hoop was brought to an orphanage, where he received his first name. He was probably born in March or April 1998, but his exact date of birth is unknown. De Hoop celebrates his birthday on 16 April. He was adopted by a Dutch couple when he was about eight months old, and he grew up in the Frisian village Wommels. The couple later adopted another Ethiopian boy.

During his childhood, De Hoop played football as a striker at a number of clubs including SC Cambuur and ONS Sneek, and he played Frisian handball. He attended the high school RSG Magister Alvinus in Sneek at havo level, graduating in 2016. He has told that he joined the school's debating society in fourth class to get out of having to hand in a school assignment. In 2016, he participated in the national debating and speech contest Op weg naar het Lagerhuis, where he ended up among the three speech finalists. De Hoop argued during the final for caring more about refugees.

He studied journalism at the Windesheim University of Applied Sciences in Zwolle but did not finish his study because of his job in the municipal council and as a presenter of Het Klokhuis. In 2019 – after he had left Het Klokhuis – he started studying public administration at the NHL Stenden University of Applied Sciences's Thorbecke Academie in Leeuwarden but again did not complete the program.

== Local politics and TV host ==
De Hoop participated in the November 2017 municipal election in his municipality, Súdwest-Fryslân, being placed sixth on the party list of the Labour Party. He won a seat and was sworn in as councilor in January 2018 at age nineteen. His specializations included spatial planning and housing. De Hoop was also hired as a host of the educational children's show Het Klokhuis, which is broadcast on weekdays by Omroep NTR, in December 2017. Filming began in February of the following year and the first episode presented by De Hoop was televised in October.

In addition, he was Matthijs van Nieuwkerk's sidekick in an episode of De Wereld Draait Door and he was a jury member of the 2018 edition of Op weg naar het Lagerhuis. De Hoop left Het Klokhuis in the summer of 2019. He was also involved in the youth think tank Coalitie-Y after a call by Prime Minister Mark Rutte in May 2020 for more input from younger people on government policy surrounding the COVID-19 pandemic. He was again part of the jury of Op weg naar het Lagerhuis in 2022, and he wrote the text for It grut Frysk diktee, a West Frisian dictation broadcast by Omrop Fryslân, that same year. The theme of De Hoop's text was sport.

== House of Representatives ==
=== First term ===
He ran for member of parliament in the 2021 general election as the Labour Party's ninth candidate. He was elected to the House and received 10,092 preference votes. He became the youngest member of the new House, which was installed on 31 March, and the third youngest MP in Dutch parliamentary history up to that point. De Hoop vacated his municipal council seat in April. His focus in the House became education, media, infrastructure, and water management. De Hoop's maiden speech about his past and equality of opportunity received positive reactions.

He submitted a bill in October 2021 to amend Article 23 of the constitution, which ensures freedom of education, such that schools cannot reject students, such that equality of opportunity is promoted, and such that schools must adhere to the values of democracy and the rule of law. De Hoop had taken over the proposal from party leader Lodewijk Asscher, which is supposed to bring an end to religious schools rejecting people based on their beliefs and to hostile environments for LGBT students. The Council of State advised against major parts of the amendment, stating that it was unclear how it would increase acceptance and that it could limit educational freedom. Besides – together with Laura Bromet (GL) and Alexander Hammelburg (D66) – De Hoop continued an effort to amend article 1 of the constitution to add disability and sexual orientation as grounds on which discrimination is prohibited. Both houses of parliament had already voted in favor of the amendment, but a constitutional amendment required a second affirmative vote following elections. The Senate eventually passed it for a second time in January 2023.

De Hoop also advocated the construction of the Lelylijn, a proposed railway between Lelystad and Groningen to better connect the northern provinces to the rest of the country, but a motion by De Hoop amid ongoing coalition agreement negotiations did not receive a majority in the House. In 2022, he pled for public transportation to become a basic right. When bus lines throughout the country were threatened with discontinuation due to the COVID-19 pandemic, De Hoop argued that they have an important function in rural areas and that some people are dependent on them. In early 2023, he presented a plan with GroenLinks to make public transport more affordable. They proposed an experiment to provide free public transport to lower-income individuals as well as a reversal of recent price hikes in tickets. The €400 million required for the latter would be funded through an increase in the wealth and corporate taxes.

=== Second term ===
He secured a second term in the November 2023 general election, and his specialties changed to public transport, traffic, and housing. Commenting on close cooperation between the Labour Party and GroenLinks and plans of the parties to merge, De Hoop said he advocated for a new left-wing party instead of a "prolonged merger process". He argued that the political left should change its focus from redistribution of income and wealth to lowering the cost of living. His plea was endorsed by party leaders Frans Timmermans (Labour Party) and Jesse Klaver (GroenLinks) soon after. In 2024, De Hoop and Olger van Dijk (NSC) proposed a bill that would allow provinces to establish their own public transport companies. They are required to tender to corporations, and some provinces were encountering difficulties in receiving sufficient bids. De Hoop said that financial incentives were hurting the quality and reach of public transport. When housing minister Mona Keijzer announced plans to scrap a new regulation requiring future constructions to include breeding and hiding places for birds and bats, De Hoop filed a motion opposing the decision. It was adopted by the House.

=== Committee assignments ===
==== 2021–2023 term ====
- Committee for Education, Culture and Science
- Committee for Finance
- Committee for Infrastructure and Water Management
- Committee for Kingdom Relations
- Delegation to the Interparliamentary Committee on the Dutch Language Union

==== 2023–present term ====
- Committee for Infrastructure and Water Management
- Committee for Housing and Spatial Planning

== Personal life ==
While a member of parliament, De Hoop moved from the Frisian village of Easterein to The Hague, and he returned to Wommels later in his term, where he lives with his girlfriend. He is a supporter of football club SC Heerenveen and additionally plays the sport as a member of the Easterein club VV SDS.

== Electoral history ==
Electoral history of Habtamu de Hoop
| Year | Body | Party | Pos. | Votes | Result | | Ref. |
| Year | Body | Party | Pos. | Votes | Party seats | Individual | Ref. |
|---|---|---|---|---|---|---|---|
| 2021 | House of Representatives | Labour Party | 9 | 10,092 | 9 | Won | |
| 2023 | House of Representatives | GroenLinks–PvdA | 12 | 20,077 | 25 | Won | |
| 2025 | House of Representatives | GroenLinks–PvdA | 8 | 28,605 | 20 | Won | |
