= Troelstralaan metro station =

Metro station in Schiedam, Netherlands

Troelstralaan
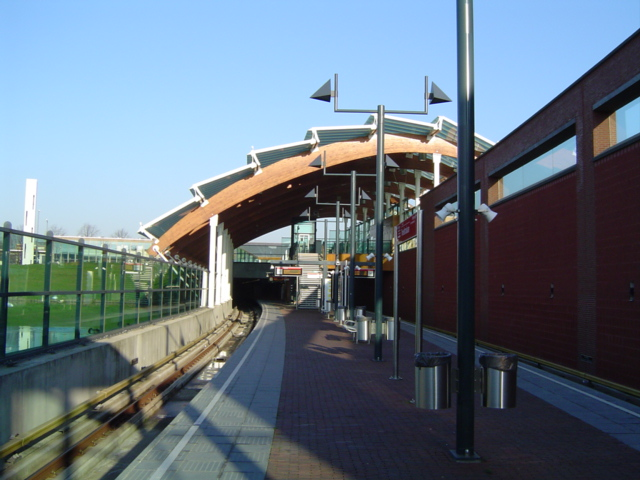

General information
- Coordinates: 51°54′55″N 4°23′03″E
- System: Rotterdam Metro station
- Owner: RET
- Platforms: Island platform
- Tracks: 2

Construction
- Structure type: At-grade

History
- Opened: 2002

Services
Preceding station	Rotterdam Metro	Following station
Vijfsluizen towards De Akkers	Line C	Parkweg towards De Terp
Location

Troelstralaan is a metro station in Schiedam, situated on Rotterdam Metro line C. The station was opened on 4 November 2002 as part of the last major expansion of the Rotterdam metro. The main entrance, at the east end of the subway station, is located on the street named after P.J. Troelstra, and the island platform is accessible by entrances on both ends.
