= Capelle Centrum metro station =

Subway station in South Holland, Netherlands

Capelle Centrum
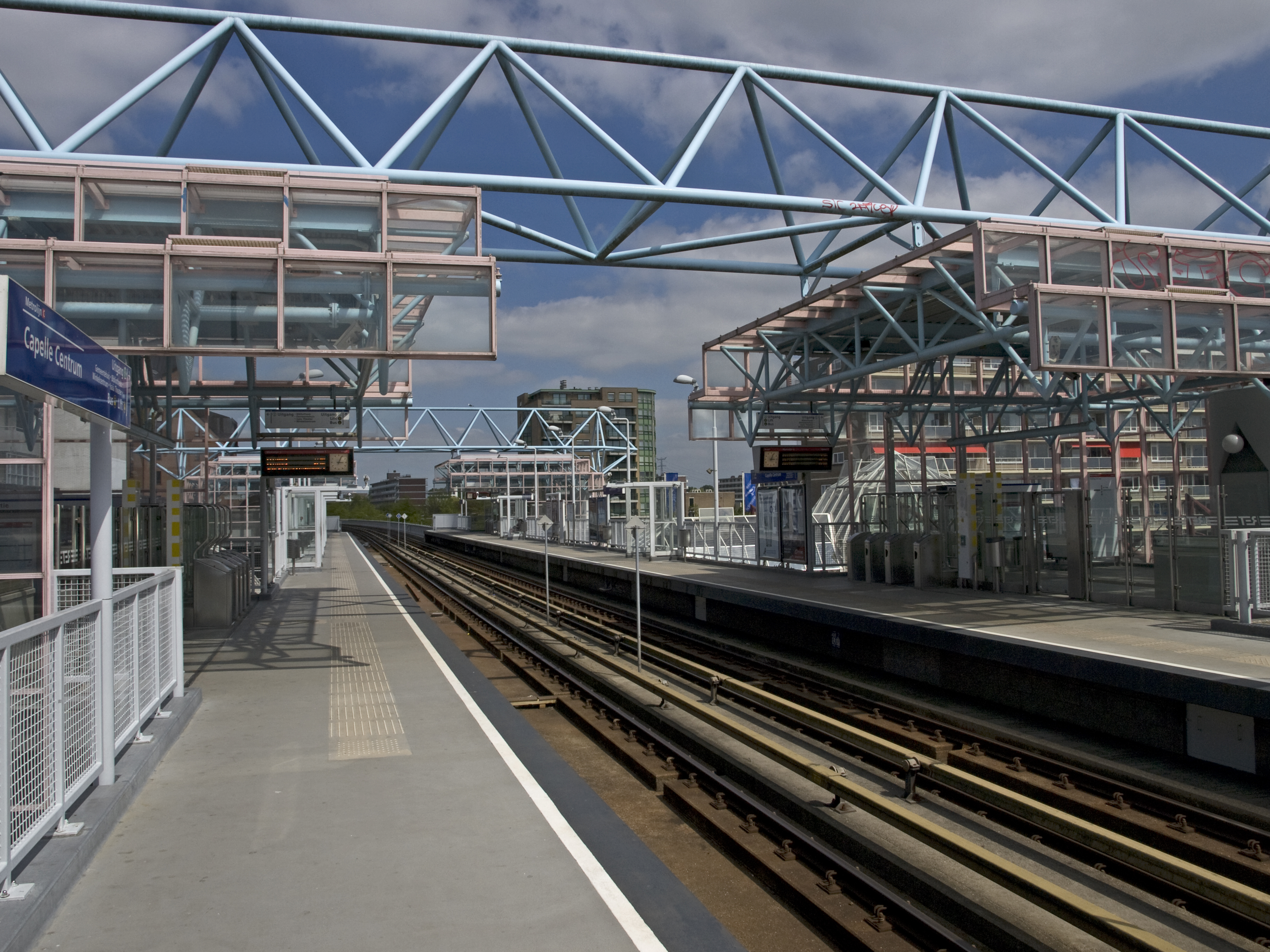
- The platforms

General information
- Coordinates: 51°55′53.04″N 4°35′22.88″E
- System: Rotterdam Metro station
- Owner: RET
- Platforms: Side platforms
- Tracks: 2

History
- Opened: 1994

Services
Preceding station	Rotterdam Metro	Following station
Slotlaan towards De Akkers	Line C	De Terp Terminus
Location

Capelle Centrum is a subway station on Line C of the Rotterdam Metro and is situated in the town of Capelle aan den IJssel, just east of Rotterdam.

The station was opened on 26 May 1994 as part of the extension of the East-West Line or Caland Line from Capelsebrug station towards De Terp station. The station consists of two tracks with a platform on both sides. Near the station is shopping mall de Koperwiek. Also RET bus 31 to Oostgaarde stops once every half an hour near the station.
