= Parkweg metro station =

Metro station in Schiedam, Netherlands

Parkweg
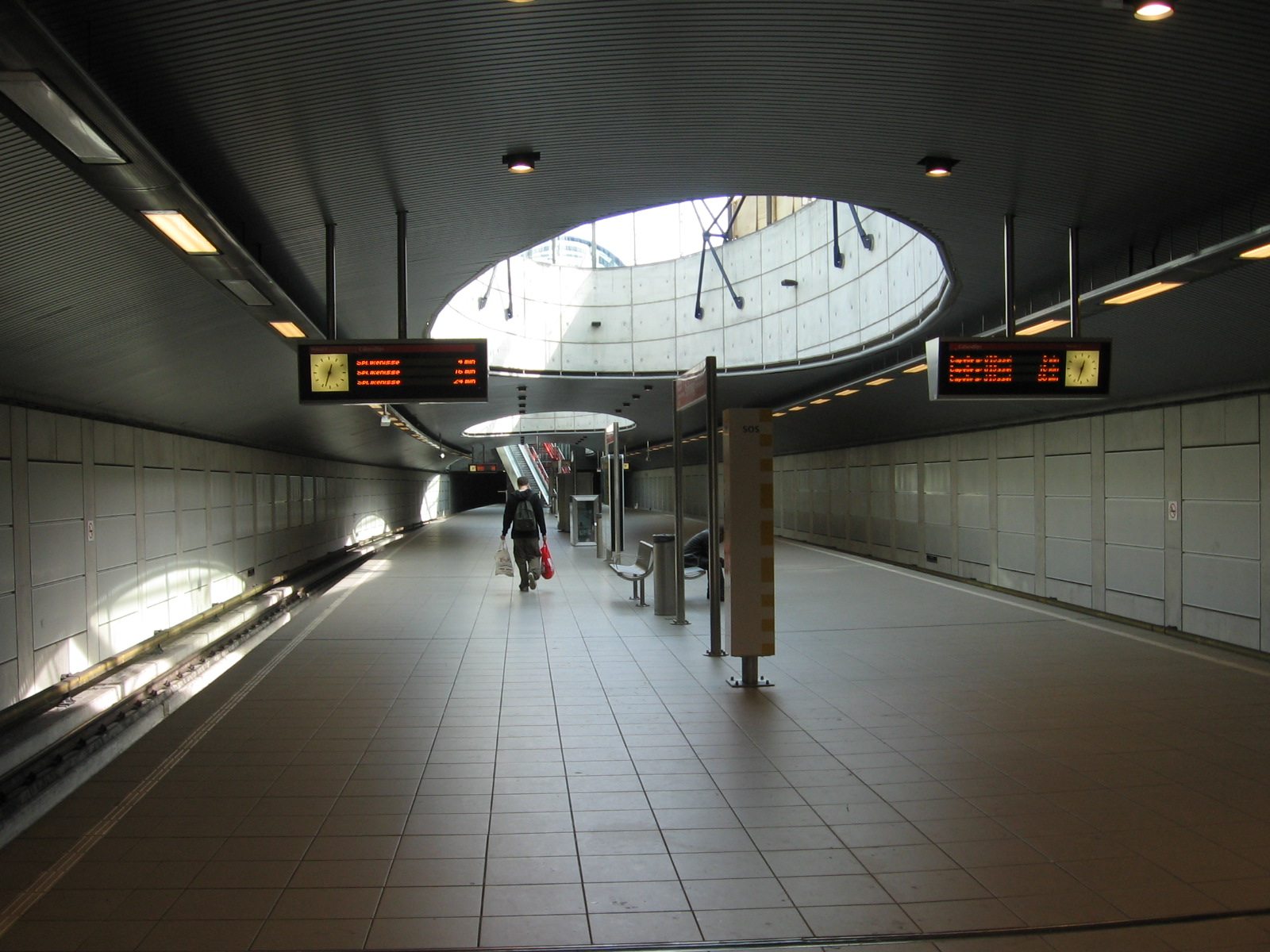

General information
- Coordinates: 51°55′17.19″N 4°23′39.93″E
- System: Rotterdam Metro station
- Owner: RET
- Platforms: Island platform
- Tracks: 2

Construction
- Structure type: Underground

History
- Opened: 2002

Services
Preceding station	Rotterdam Metro	Following station
Troelstralaan towards De Akkers	Line C	Schiedam Centrum towards De Terp
Location

Parkweg is an underground subway station in the Dutch town of Schiedam, located just west of Rotterdam. The station is part of Rotterdam Metro line C and was opened as part of an extension of the East-West Line (also formerly called Caland line) which opened in November 2002. This extension connected the former terminus Marconiplein to the North-South Line (also Erasmus line) at Tussenwater station.

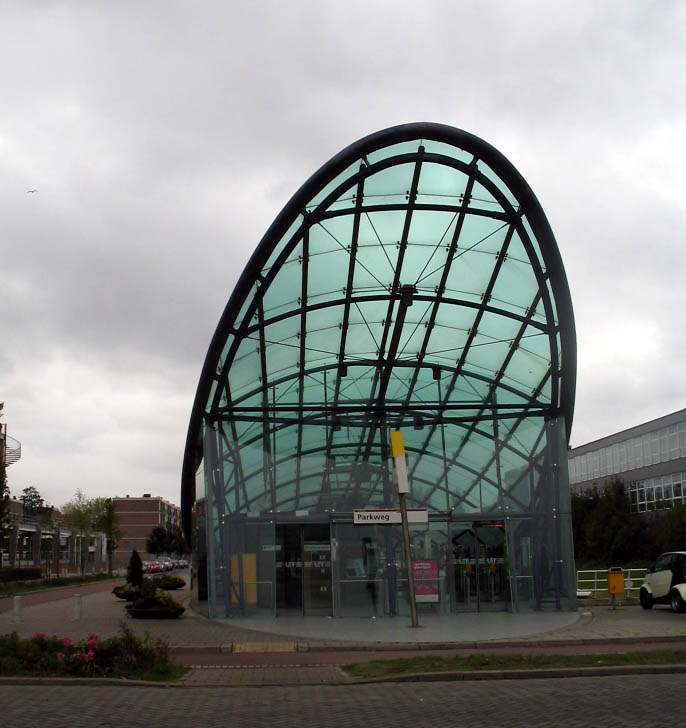
The southern entrance to Parkweg station
