= Clemens Cornielje =

Dutch politician, political consultant, and educator (1958–2022)

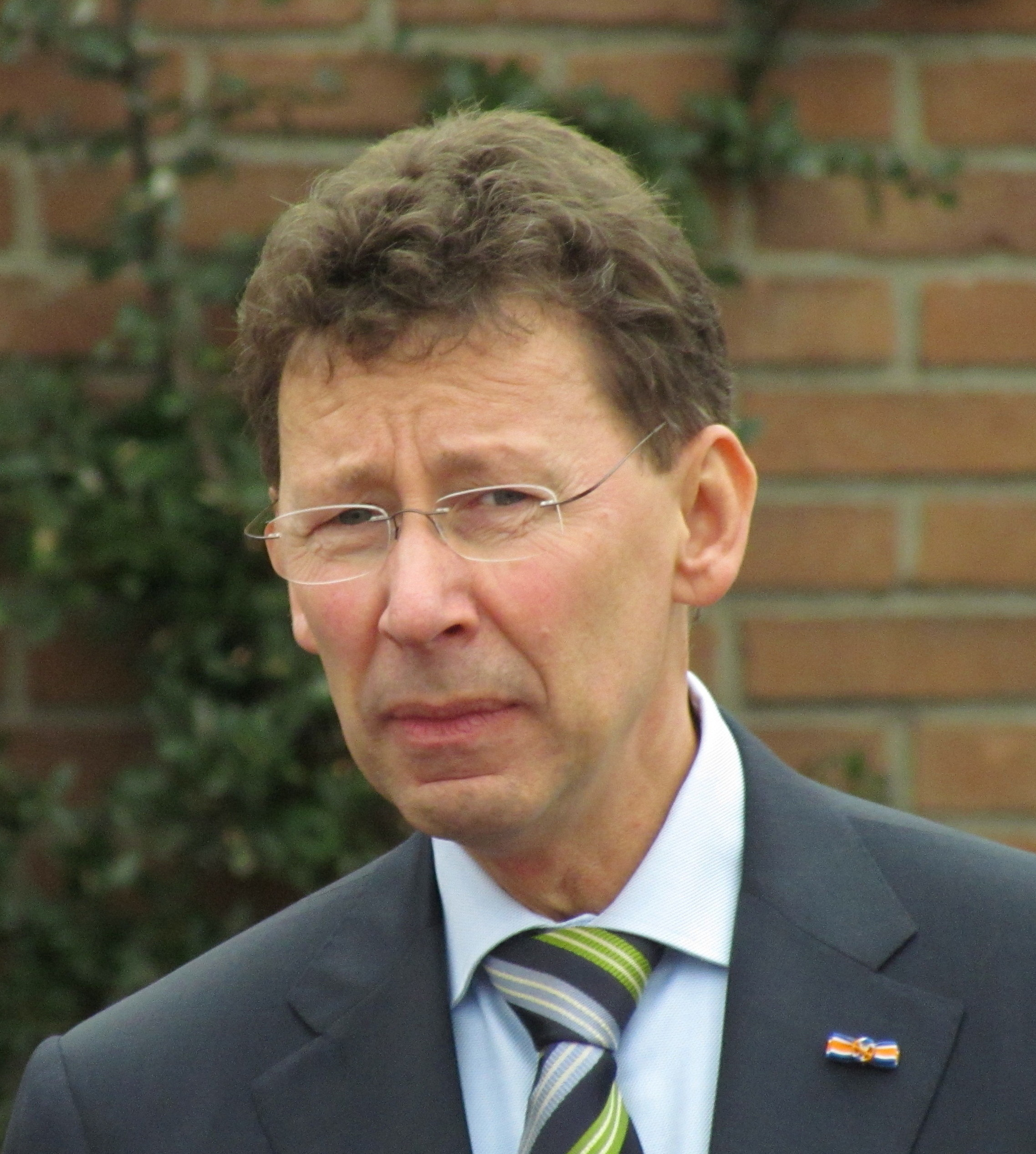
- Cornielje in 2011

Member of House of Representatives of the Netherlands
- In office 1994–2005

King's Commissioner of Gelderland
- In office 31 August 2005 – 23 January 2019
- Preceded by: Jan Kamminga
- Succeeded by: John Berends

Personal details
- Born: 10 June 1958 Herwen en Aerdt, Netherlands
- Died: 17 March 2022 (aged 63) Arnhem, Netherlands
- Cause of death: Brain tumor
- Party: People's Party for Freedom and Democracy

Clemens Gerard Antoon Cornielje (10 June 1958 – 17 March 2022) was a Dutch politician and political consultant and educator.

== Biography ==
Born in Lobith, he was member of the People's Party for Freedom and Democracy (Volkspartij voor Vrijheid en Democratie). From 1994 to 2005 he was a member of the Dutch House of Representatives. From 31 August 2005 to 23 January 2019 he has been King's Commissioner (Queen's Commissioner until 2013) of the province of Gelderland.

Cornielje studied biology and mathematics at a vocational university in Nijmegen to become a teacher in secondary education. He was a member of the Roman Catholic Church, and was openly gay.

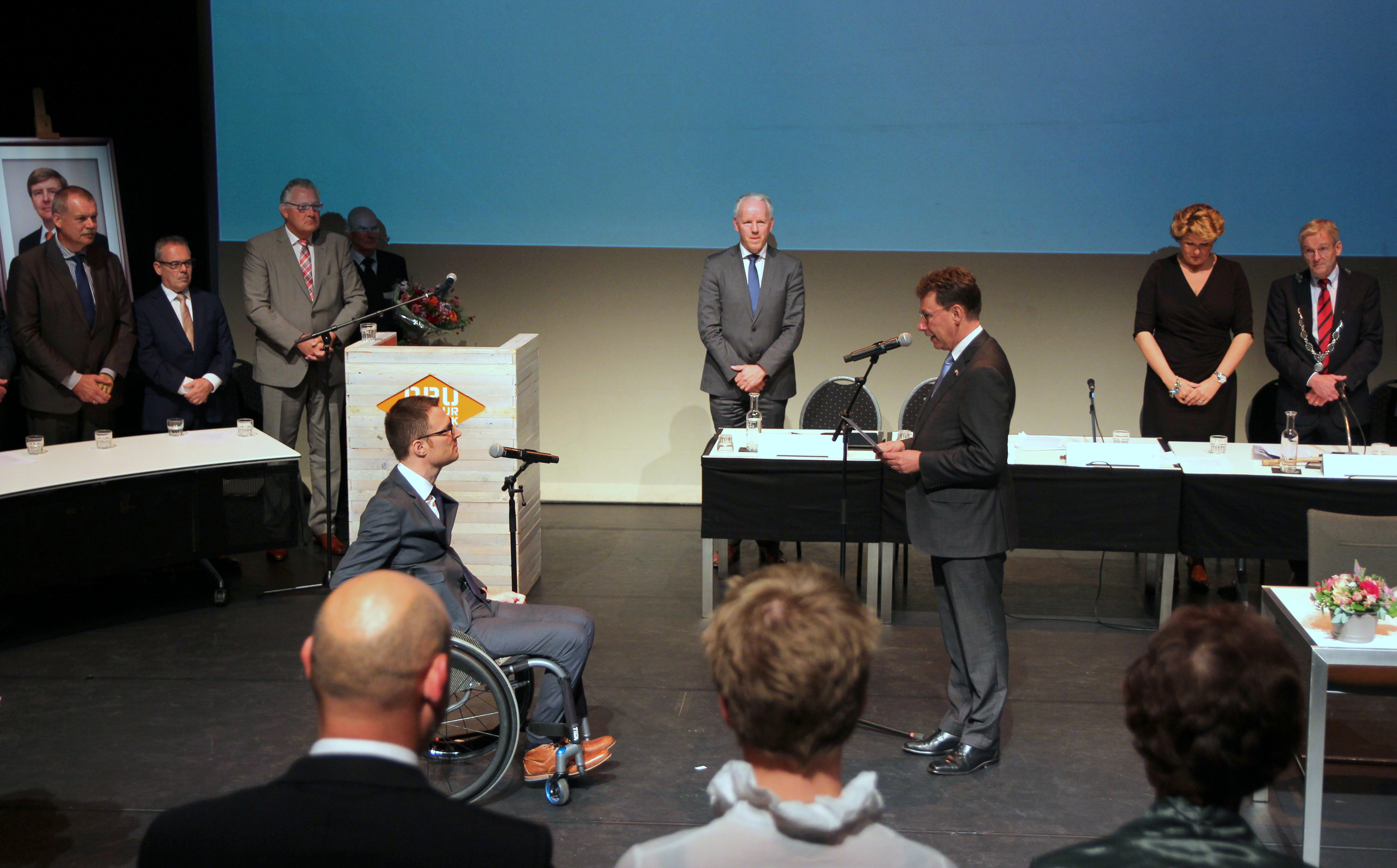
Cornielje at the appointment of Otwin van Dijk as mayor of Oude IJsselstreek in 2016

At the beginning of 2010, Cornielje was diagnosed with a malignant tumor, requiring him to resign. But he returned to work after several months. He was diagnosed with cancer again in May 2015. In April 2017, a brain tumor was discovered.

On 11 April 2018, Cornielje announced his intention to resign as King's Commissioner on 1 February 2019. He justified this not because of his illness, but because it is time for his successor. By announcing his departure early, according to him, there will be enough space to find his successor in time. He told his political party that he wanted to be a member of the Dutch Senate.

On 2 August 2018, it was announced that Cornielje had temporarily resigned from his duties as King's commissioner because of meningitis. He came back to his duties, and bid farewell to the position on 23 January 2019. He was officially replaced by John Berends on 6 February 2019.

Clemens Cornielje was one of three openly gay politicians who served as King's Commissioner, the other two are Jan Franssen and Arno Brok. He was in a relationship with his partner Bertil Niehoff. He died in Arnhem in March 2022.

== See also ==
- List of openly LGBT heads of government
- List of LGBT holders of political offices in the Netherlands

Political offices
Preceded by Jan Kamminga	King's Commissioner of Gelderland; 2005–2019	Succeeded by John Berends
