= Jan Franssen =

Dutch politician (born 1951)

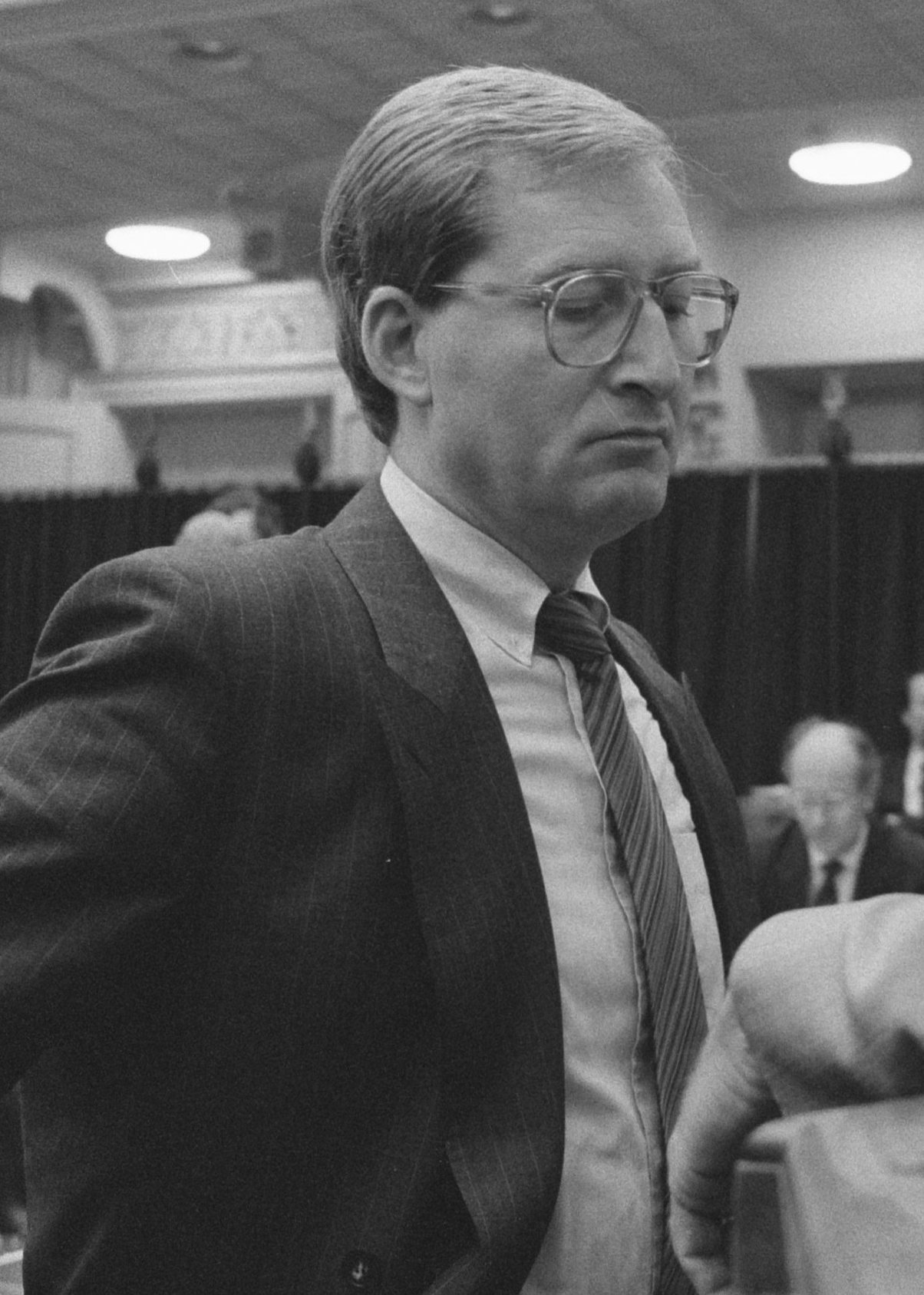
Jan Franssen (1988)

Jan Franssen (born 11 June 1951 in Hilversum) is a Dutch politician.

Franssen is a member of the VVD. He began his political career as an advisor to Hans Wiegel, having previously worked as a history teacher. Franssen was also a city councillor of Nederhorst den Berg, leader of the provincial parliament of North Holland and a member of the House of Representatives (1982–1994). From 1994 to 2000 Franssen was mayor of Zwolle. Finally. he was named King's Commissioner in South Holland in 2000. He resigned on December 31, 2013. He was made member of the Council of State of the Netherlands the next day.

He is the current chairman of the Interprovinciaal Overleg (IPO), that looks after provincial interests.

Franssen is openly gay.

Jan Franssen is one of three openly gay politicians who served as King's Commissioner, the other two are: Clemens Cornielje, and Arno Brok.

== See also ==
- List of openly LGBT heads of government
- List of the first LGBT holders of political offices
- List of LGBT holders of political offices in the Netherlands

Political offices
| Preceded by Loek Hermans | Mayor of Zwolle; 1994–2000 | Succeeded by Henk Jan Meijer |
| Preceded by David Luteijn; Acting | King's Commissioner of South Holland; 2000–2013 | Succeeded by Jaap Smit |
