= Olger van Dijk =

Dutch politician (born 1979)

Member of the House of Representatives
- In office 6 December 2023 – 11 November 2025

Personal details
- Born: 4 January 1979 (age 47) Ermelo, Netherlands
- Party: New Social Contract (since 2023)
- Other political affiliations: Christian Democratic Appeal (until 2023)
- Education: University of Twente

Olger C. van Dijk (born 4 January 1979) is a Dutch politician of the New Social Contract (NSC) party who served as a member of the House of Representatives between 2023 and 2025.

== Political career ==
Van Dijk had been a member of the Christian Democratic Appeal (CDA) until he switched to NSC in 2023, when it was founded by Pieter Omtzigt, a former CDA member. He was asked to join by Eddy van Hijum, and he described NSC as having similar political views as the CDA, but with a broader foundation. He was elected to the House of Representatives in the 2023 Dutch general election. His portfolio included infrastructure, public transport, aviation, water management, and sports before the latter three were replaced by defense following the Schoof cabinet's swearing in.

In 2024, Van Dijk and Habtamu de Hoop (GL/PvdA) proposed a bill that would allow provinces to establish their own public transport companies. They are required to tender to corporations, and some provinces were encountering difficulties in receiving sufficient bids. Van Dijk believed a public company could lead to improved accessibility and service for students and the elderly, in particular. Responding to unsafe situations and nuisance caused by electric fatbikes, he introduced a motion with Hester Veltman (VVD) calling on the government to set a minimum driving age of 14 and to require helmets. Minister Barry Madlener advised against the motion, but it was adopted by an overwhelming majority of the House. Madlener did not comply, arguing that fatbikes could not easily be distinguished from other electric bicycles and that they do not come with increased risk. Another motion by Van Dijk passed in which the House urged Madlener to limit air traffic at Amsterdam Airport Schiphol more severely to reduce noise pollution for local residents, in line with the cabinet's governing agreement.

He did not run for re-election in 2025, and his term ended on 11 November 2025.

=== House committee assignments ===
- Committee for Kingdom Relations (chair)
- Committee for European Affairs
- Committee for Foreign Affairs
- Committee for Defence
- Committee for Asylum and Migration
- Committee for Infrastructure and Water Management
- Delegation to the Benelux Parliament
- Delegation to the OSCE Parliamentary Assembly

== Personal life ==
Van Dijk grew up in Putten. His family were members of the Dutch Reformed Church, and he made his profession of faith at the age of 18. As of 2024, Van Dijk's family attended the Nieuwe Kerk in Amersfoort, part of the Protestant Church in the Netherlands. He has played chess since his youth.

== Electoral history ==
Electoral history of Olger van Dijk
Year	Body	Party	Pos.	Votes	Result		Ref.
Year	Body	Party	Pos.	Votes	Party seats	Individual	Ref.
2006	House of Representatives	Christian Democratic Appeal	56	4,362	41	Lost	
2010	House of Representatives	Christian Democratic Appeal	45	198	21	Lost	
2023	House of Representatives	New Social Contract	19	838	20	Won	

== See also ==
- List of members of the House of Representatives of the Netherlands, 2023–2025
