= Capelle aan den IJssel =

- Town and Municipality
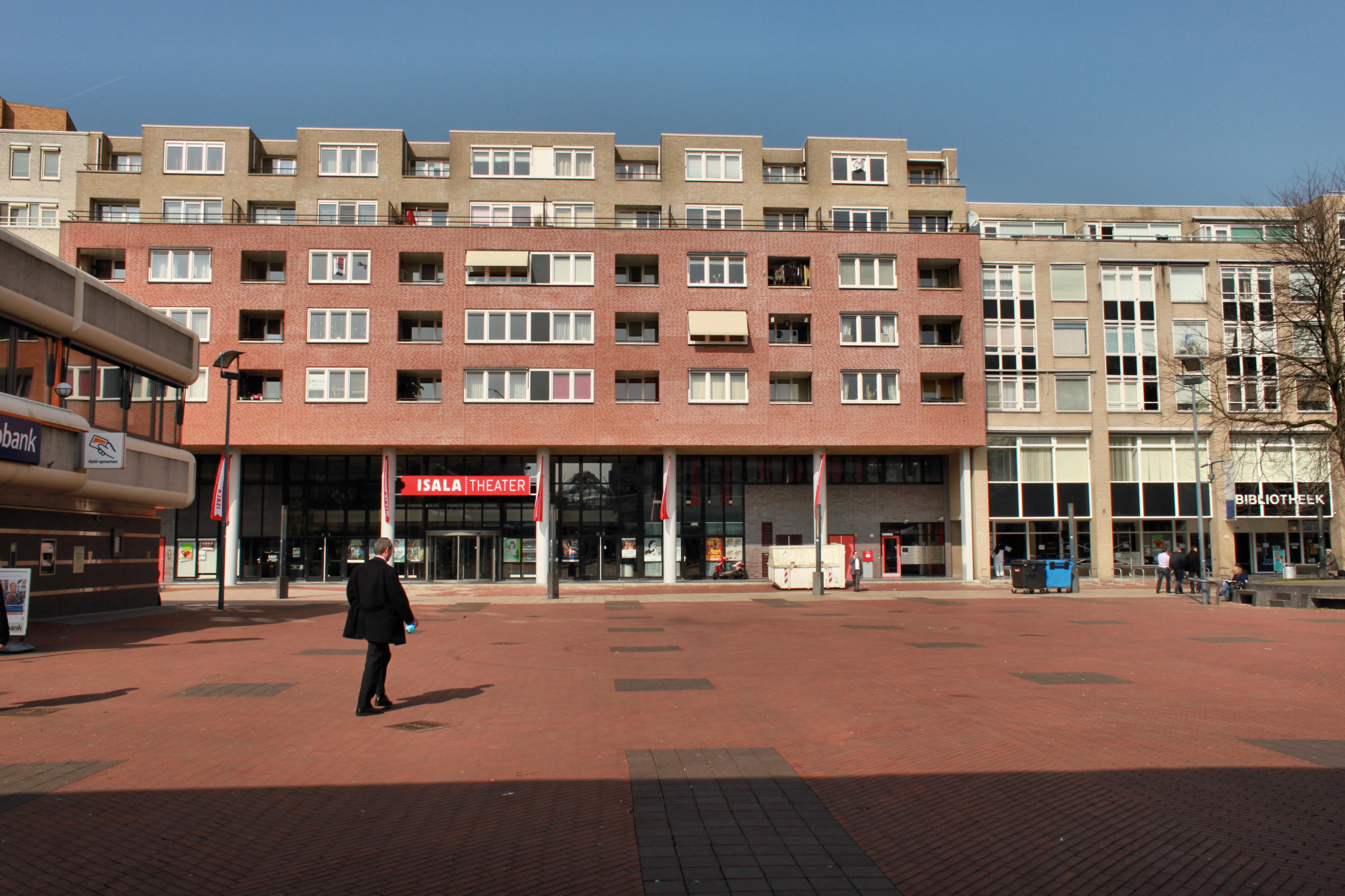
- Stadsplein square in Capelle

- Flag Coat of arms

- Location in South Holland
- Coordinates: 51°56′N 4°35′E
- Country: Netherlands
- Province: South Holland

Government
  - Body: Municipal council
  - Mayor: Joost Manusama (VVD)

Area
  - Total: 15.40 km^{2} (5.95 sq mi)
  - Land: 14.14 km^{2} (5.46 sq mi)
  - Water: 1.26 km^{2} (0.49 sq mi)
- Elevation: −2 m (−6.6 ft)

Population (January 2021)
  - Total: 67,319
  - Density: 4,761/km^{2} (12,330/sq mi)
- Demonym: Capellenaar
- Time zone: UTC+1 (CET)
  - Summer (DST): UTC+2 (CEST)
- Postcode: 2900–2909
- Area code: 010
- Website: www.capelleaandenijssel.nl

Capelle aan den IJssel (Dutch pronunciation: [kaːˈpɛlə ʔaːn dən ˈɛisəl] or [- də ˈʔɛi-]; transl. "Capelle on the IJssel") is a large town and municipality in the western Netherlands, in the province of South Holland. The municipality had a population of 67,319 in 2021, and covers an area of 15.40 km^{2} (5.95 sq mi), of which 1.26 km^{2} (0.49 sq mi) is water. It is situated on the eastern edge of Rotterdam, on the Hollandse IJssel river.

The town has what is probably the country's smallest museum, the Dief- en Duifhuisje ("House of Thieves and Pigeons"). Now a historical museum, it served as the prison for the castle of Capelle and is all that now remains of the 17th-century castle.

On opposing sides of the A16 motorway are two business parks called Rivium and Brainpark respectively. Companies based in the larger Rivium include Rockwell Automation, Pfizer Nederland, Sodexho Nederland, Royal Dutch Shell, Van Oord, and many more.

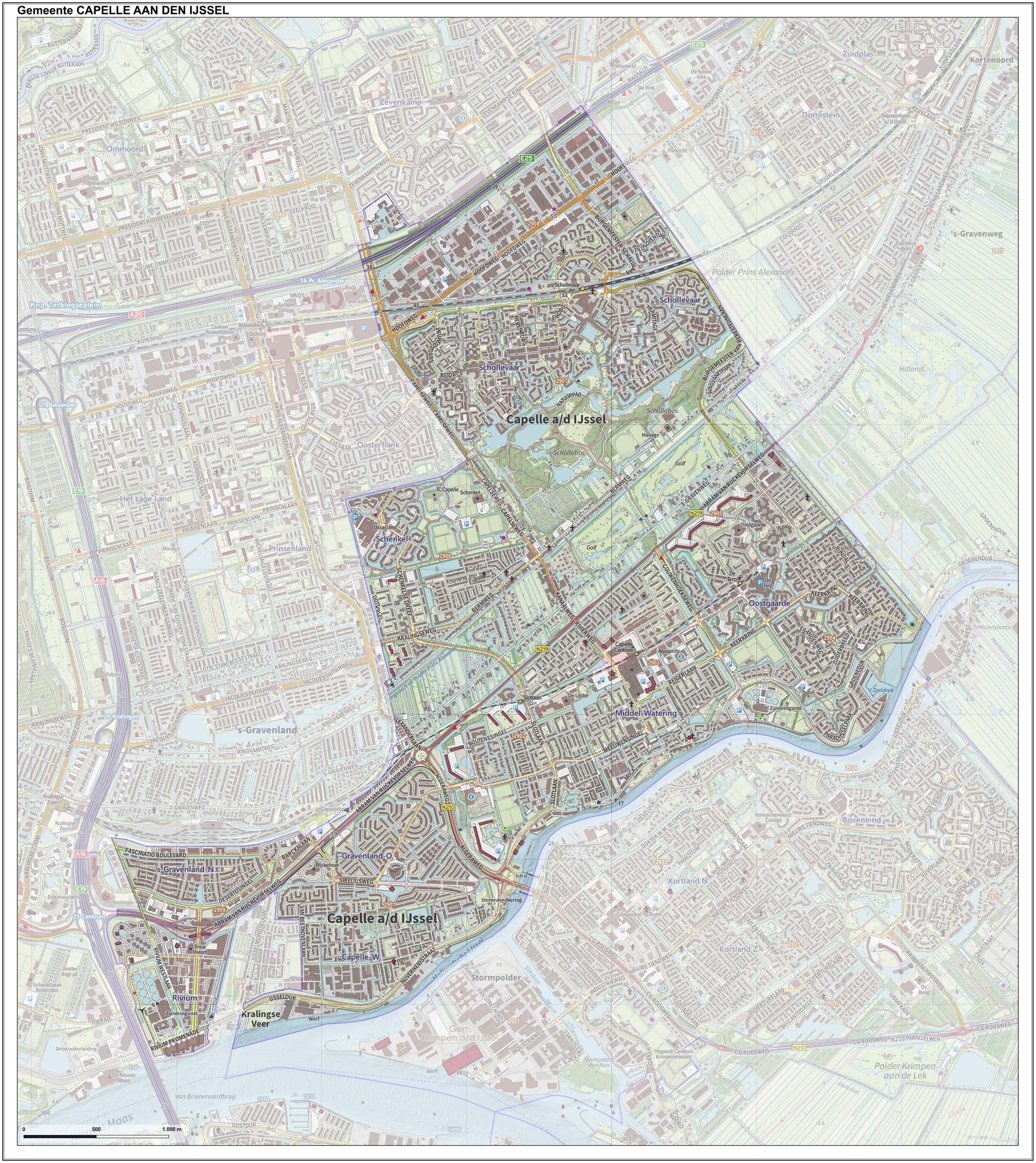
Dutch topographic map of the municipality of Capelle aan den IJssel, June 2015

== Public transport ==
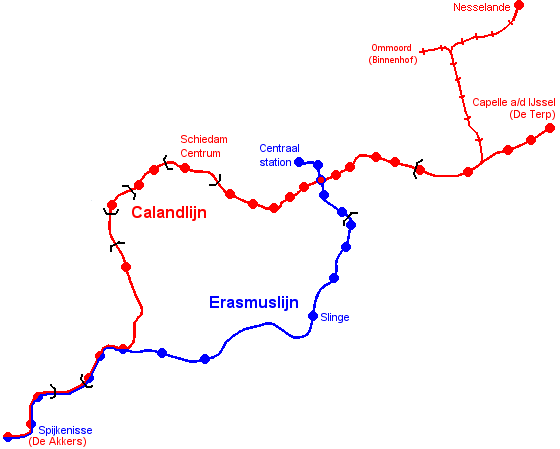

Capelle aan den IJssel is connected to the Rotterdam Metro system:

- Line C starts at De Terp station, proceeds to Capelle Centrum station and Slotlaan station, then to the cities of Rotterdam, Schiedam and Spijkenisse.
- Connections with the main railway system on line C are at Blaak station and at Schiedam Centrum station. After changing to line A or B (at Capelsebrug station) also at Alexander station, and after changing to line D (at Beurs station), finally also at Rotterdam Centraal station. To and from the direction The Hague the fastest connection is usually with a change at Schiedam Centrum; for other directions it varies.
- Capelle aan den IJssel has its own train station, Capelle Schollevaar. This station is located outside of the town centre in the Schollevaar neighborhood. Local trains from Rotterdam to Gouda and Amsterdam stop at this station.

On 15 November 1899 the Capelle train accident took place.

== Notable people ==
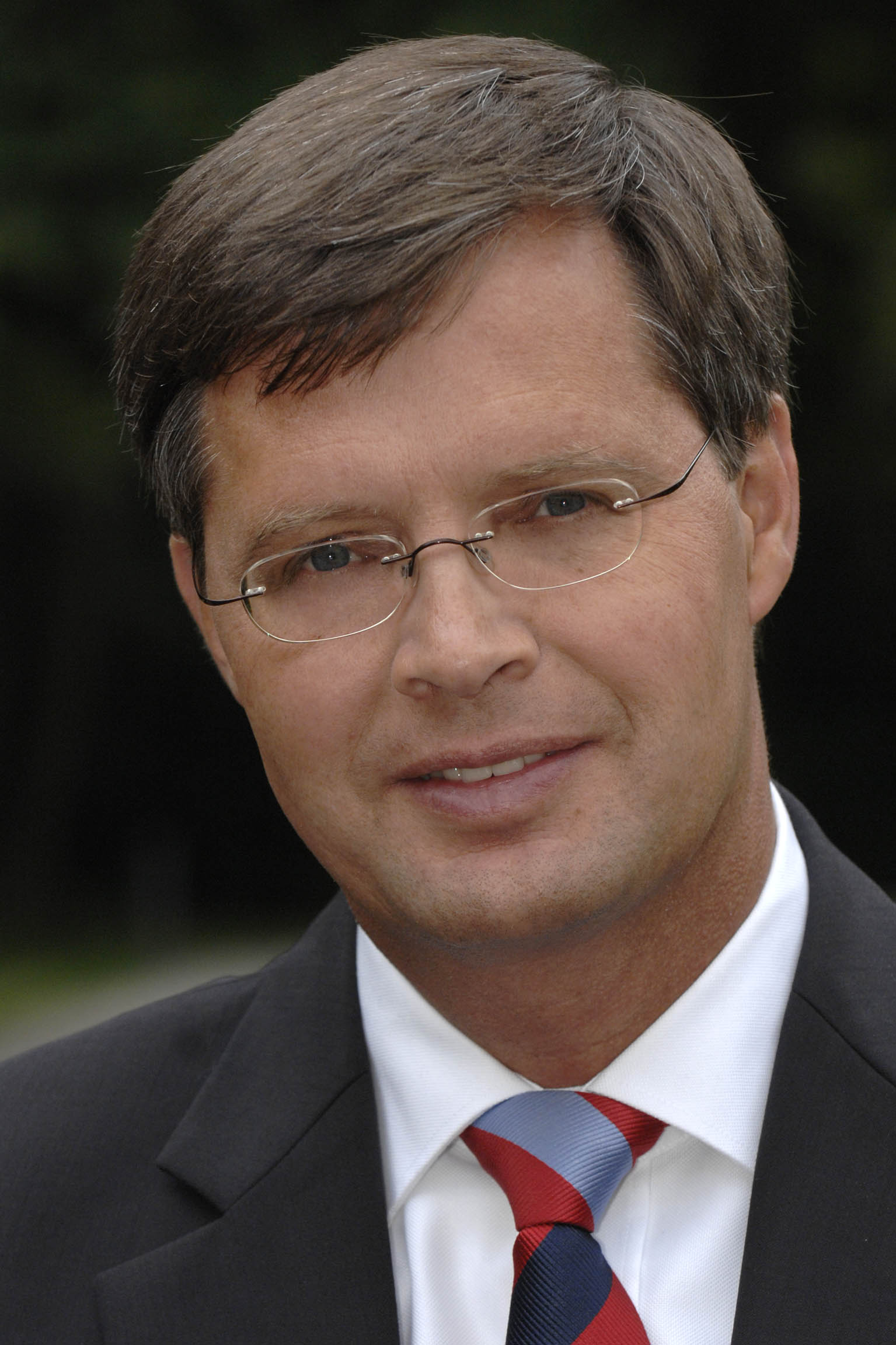
Jan Peter Balkenende, 2006

=== Politics ===
- Hans Blokland (born 1943) is a former Dutch politician; municipal councillor of Capelle aan den IJssel 1974 to 1994
- Jan Peter Balkenende (born 1956) is a Dutch jurist and retired politician, Prime Minister of the Netherlands 2002 to 2010; lives in Capelle aan den IJssel
- Jet Bussemaker (born 1961) is a retired Dutch politician and academic
- Hester Veltman-Kamp (born 1973), Dutch politician
- Wouter Koolmees (born 1977) is a Dutch politician; second Deputy Prime Minister of the Netherlands 2019-2020

=== Sport ===
- Bart Latuheru (born 1965) is a Dutch retired professional footballer with 450 club caps
- Ferry de Haan (born 1972) is a Dutch retired footballer with 179 club caps and club manager
- Nick Viergever (born 1989) is a Dutch footballer with over 250 club caps
- Noa Lang (born 1999) is a Dutch footballer that plays for Galatasaray S.K.

=== Music ===
- Pieter-Jan Belder (born 1966) is a instrumentalist, plays recorder, harpsichord and fortepiano
- Davina Michelle (born 1995) is a Dutch singer since 2020
- Ronnie Flex (born 1992) is a Dutch rapper

=== Art ===
- Wil Tirion (1943 – 2024), Dutch uranographer
