= Hester Veltman =

Dutch politician (born 1973)

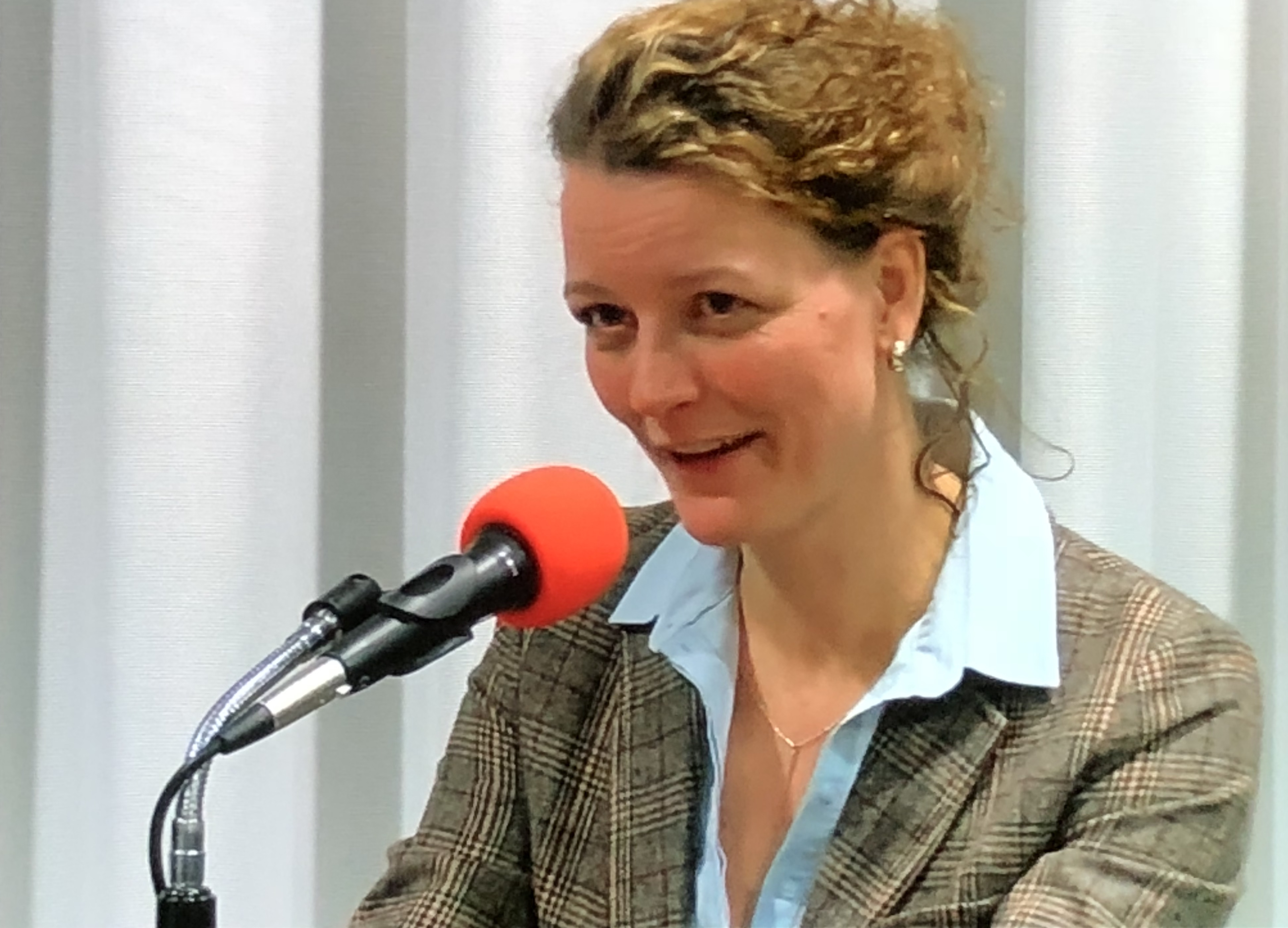

Member of the House of Representatives
- In office 6 December 2023 – 11 November 2025

Personal details
- Born: 13 November 1973 (age 52) Capelle aan den IJssel, Netherlands
- Party: VVD

Hester Veltman-Kamp (born 13 November 1973) is a Dutch politician from the People's Party for Freedom and Democracy who was a member of the House of Representatives between December 2023 and November 2025. She served as the VVD's spokesperson for roads and public transport (formerly also environment, juvenile delinquency, human trafficking, prostitution, and gambling).

Responding to unsafe situations and nuisance caused by electric fatbikes, she introduced a motion with Olger van Dijk (NSC) calling on the government to set a minimum driving age of 14 and to require helmets. Minister Barry Madlener advised against the motion, but it was adopted by an overwhelming majority of the House. Madlener did not comply, arguing that fatbikes could not easily be distinguished from other electric bicycles and that they do not come with increased risk. In another motion passed by the House, Veltman called for a four-year delay in phasing in zero-emission zones for commercial vehicles in several city centers, which was set to start in 2025. In response, State Secretary Chris Jansen called on municipalities to not enforce the zones in their first year and to postpone by a year the effective date for the cleanest type of diesel delivery vans. Municipalities did not comply with Jansen's request.

== House committee assignments ==
- Committee for Infrastructure and Water Management
- Committee for Housing and Spatial Planning

== Electoral history ==
Electoral history of Hester Veltman-Kamp
| Year | Body | Party | Pos. | Votes | Result | | Ref. |
| Year | Body | Party | Pos. | Votes | Party seats | Individual | Ref. |
|---|---|---|---|---|---|---|---|
| 2023 | House of Representatives | People's Party for Freedom and Democracy | 16 | 1,974 | 24 / 150 | Won | |
| 2026 | Ede Municipal Council | People's Party for Freedom and Democracy | 28 (Note: Veltman participated as lijstduwer.) | 63 | 3 / 39 | Lost | |

== See also ==
- List of members of the House of Representatives of the Netherlands, 2023–2025
