= Zsolt Szabó (Dutch politician) =

Dutch politician (born 1961)

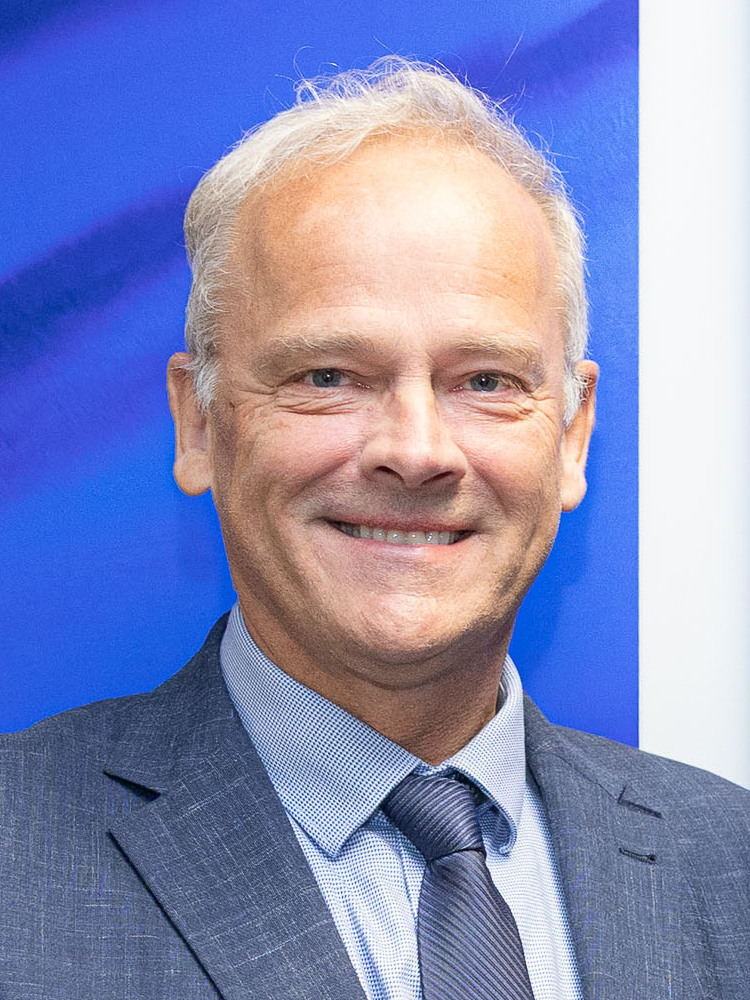
- Szabó in 2025

State Secretary for Kingdom Relations and Digitalisation
- In office 2 July 2024 – 3 June 2025
- Prime Minister: Dick Schoof
- Minister: Judith Uitermark
- Preceded by: Alexandra van Huffelen
- Succeeded by: Eddie van Marum

Member of the House of Representatives
- In office 3 June 2003 – 30 November 2006

Personal details
- Born: Ferenc Zsolt Szabó; 24 November 1961 (age 64) Amsterdam, Netherlands
- Party: PVV (2024–present)
- Other political affiliations: VVD (1986–2024)
- Occupation: Politician; corporate executive

Ferenc Zsolt Szabó (born 24 November 1961) is a Dutch politician. He served as a member of the House of Representatives between 2003 and 2005 for the conservative-liberal People's Party for Freedom and Democracy (VVD), and was State Secretary for Kingdom Relations and Digitalisation on behalf of the right-wing populist Party for Freedom in the Schoof cabinet between July 2024 and June 2025.

== Career ==
He was a member of the House of Representatives from 3 June 2003 to 30 November 2006. He was the VVD's spokesperson for ICT and development cooperation, and second spokesperson for foreign affairs. During this period, Szabó was of the opinion that the Netherlands, "partly under pressure from international legislation", would soon see the introduction of the electronic signature and identity cards with biometric features (fingerprint and iris scan). In early June 2004, he asked State Secretary Medy van der Laan for an explanation about the use of open source software in the department, because Szabó wanted to prevent "OSS fetishism" in the government.

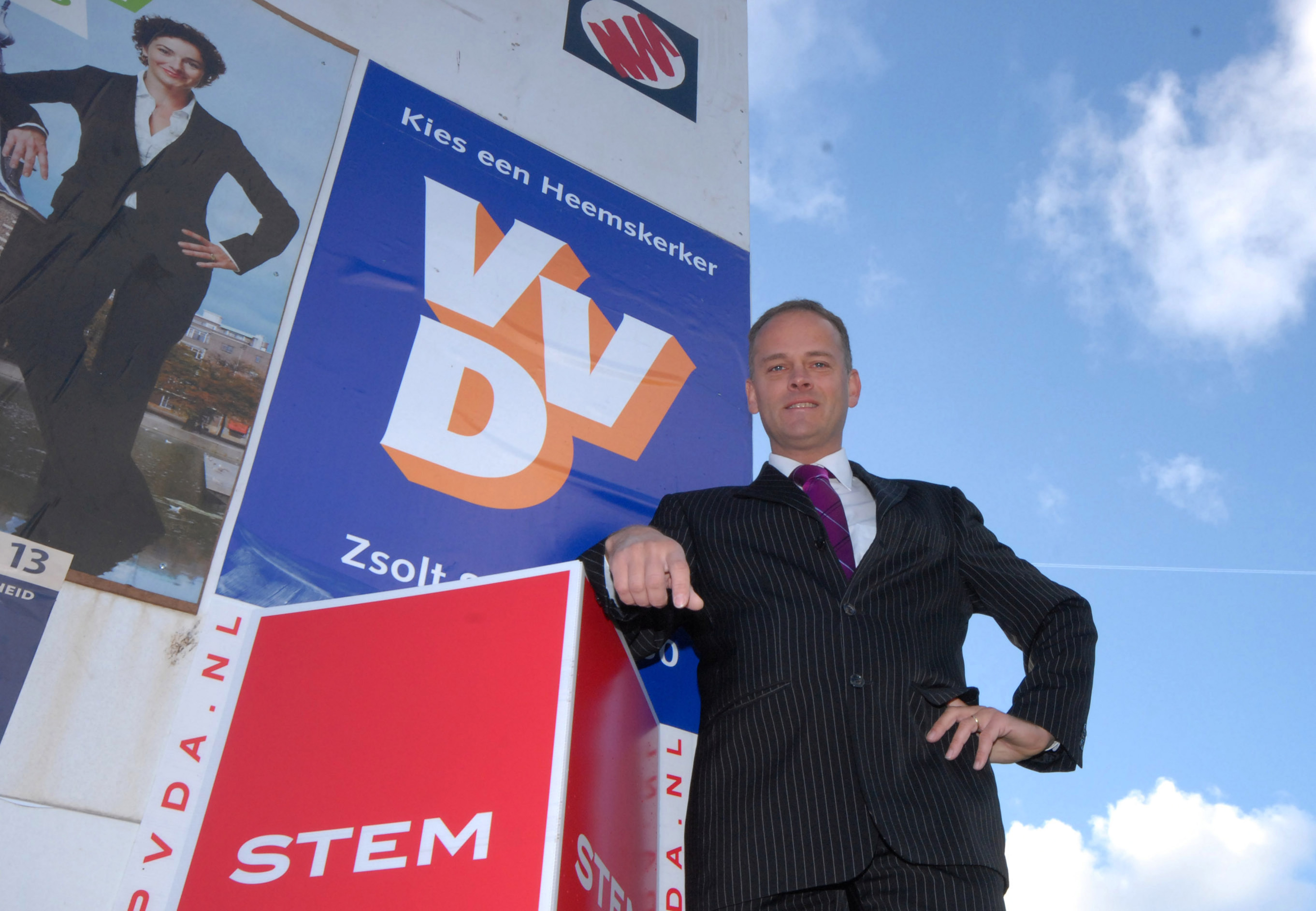
Szabó in 2006

He later served as vice president of IT consulting firm Capgemini. Simultaneously, he was chairman of the foundation that manages the Dutch do not call list, and he was vice chairman of ECP, an information society think tank.

After the PVV, VVD, NSC, and BBB formed the Schoof cabinet, Szabó was sworn in as State Secretary for Kingdom Relations and Digitalisation on 2 July 2024. He serves on behalf of the PVV, and he ended his VVD membership. Szabó stated that he wanted a more centralized approach to arranging and purchasing digital technologies in national and local governments. He planned to establish a coordinating department that could be consulted. He called the previous approach fragmented and unstandardised, and he said that it was no longer fit for technologies such as artificial intelligence, quantum computing, and cloud computing.

As the PVV left the cabinet in June 2025, Szabó resigned and fellow interior state secretary Eddie van Marum assumed responsibility for Kingdom Relations and Digitalisation.

== Personal life ==
Szabó is married and has three children. Both parents of Szabó are Hungarian. Upon his selection as state secretary, he clarified that he did not possess the Hungarian nationality.

Political offices
Preceded by Alexandra van Huffelen	State Secretary for Kingdom Relations and Digitalisation; 2024–present	Incumbent
