= Alexander Hammelburg =

Member of the Dutch House of Representatives

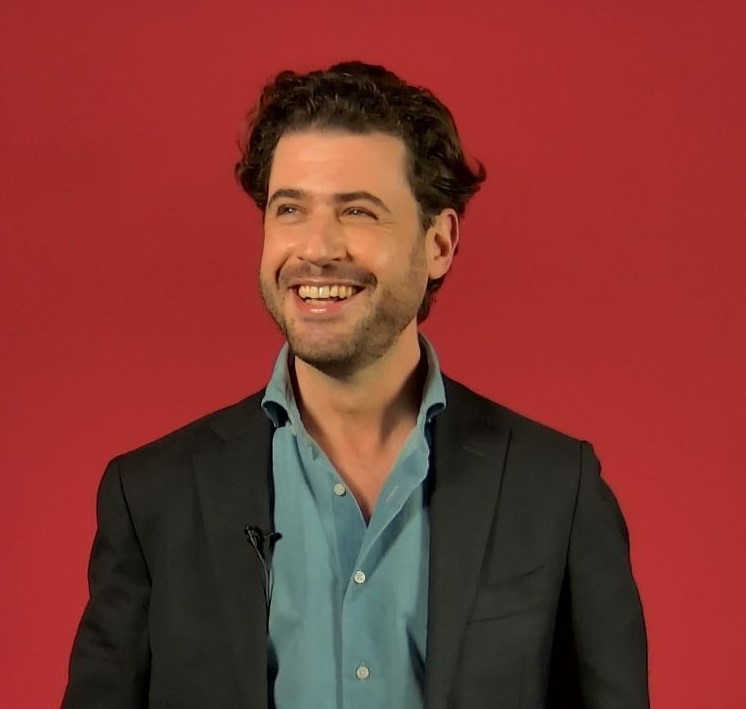
- Hammelburg in 2021

Member of the House of Representatives
- In office 31 March 2021 – 5 December 2023

Member of the Municipal Council of Amsterdam
- In office 5 April 2017 – 31 March 2021
- Preceded by: Jan Paternotte
- Succeeded by: Daniëlle de Jager

Personal details
- Born: Alexander Robert Hammelburg; 22 February 1982 (age 44) Hilversum, Netherlands
- Party: Democrats 66
- Children: 1
- Parent: Simon Hammelburg (father)
- Education: University of Amsterdam (MSc)

Alexander Robert Hammelburg (pronounced [aːlɛkˈsɑndər ˈɦɑməlˌbʏr(ə)x]; born 22 February 1982) is a Dutch politician of the Democrats 66 (D66). He has been a member of the House of Representatives since the 2021 general election. He previously worked as a lobbyist for COC Nederland and held a seat in the municipal council of Amsterdam.

== Early life and non-political career ==
Hammelburg was born in 1982 in Hilversum, as the son of comedian, writer, and journalist Simon Hammelburg. When he was young, his parents divorced, and he moved with his mother and sister from the Amsterdam neighborhood of Buitenveldert to Oosterbeek, located in the Arnhem area. Hammelburg grew up there, and he studied political science and Arab studies at the University of Amsterdam in the years 2002–12. He also spent a year at Tel Aviv University and started teaching political science at the university in 2008. He left the university in April 2015 to work as an international policy officer for LGBT rights organization COC Nederland, a position he held until his election to the House of Representatives.

== Politics ==
Hammelburg served as a member of the board of the North Holland/Flevoland chapter of the Young Democrats, the youth organization of Democrats 66. He was elected to the thirteen-member Amsterdam-Centrum district committee in the 2014 municipal elections. He had also been D66's sixteenth candidate for the Amsterdam municipal council in that election, but his party won fourteen seats.

In April 2017, Hammelburg replaced Amsterdam municipal councilor Jan Paternotte, because Paternotte had been elected to the House of Representatives. Hammelburg simultaneously left the district council. He was re-elected in the 2018 municipal election, having appeared fourth on the party list. Hammelburg served as vice caucus leader, and his specializations were finances, economic affairs, sex workers, drugs, housing, and construction. In the council, he advocated replacing lead service lines, and he created a plan to make the city center more attractive to Amsterdam citizens.

=== House of Representatives ===
Hammelburg was placed twenty-third on the candidate list of D66 for the 2021 general election. He was elected into the House of Representatives on 17 March with 841 preference votes and was installed two weeks later. Hammelburg vacated his seat in the Amsterdam municipal council the same day. He was D66's spokesperson for foreign trade, development cooperation, defense, finances, tax affairs, financial markets, and amending article 1 of the Dutch constitution. Hammelburg is part of the Dutch parliamentary delegation to the OSCE and the United States contact group, and he is a member of the Committees for Defense; for Economic Affairs and Climate Policy; for Finance; for Foreign Affairs; for Foreign Trade and Development Cooperation; and for Public Expenditure.

When Russia invaded Ukraine in 2022, he proposed for the Dutch government to start setting aside money for the reconstruction of Ukraine, comparing it to the Marshall Plan. He also wanted to provide at least €100 million for the reconstruction effort following the 2023 Turkey–Syria earthquake, but Minister for Foreign Trade and Development Cooperation Liesje Schreinemacher responded that she did not have the money available. Together with Laura Bromet (GL) and Habtamu de Hoop (PvdA), he continued an effort to amend article 1 of the Constitution of the Netherlands to add disability and sexual orientation as grounds on which discrimination is prohibited. Both houses of parliament had already voted in favor of the amendment, but a constitutional amendment required a second affirmative vote following elections. The Senate eventually passed it for a second time in January 2023.

== Personal life ==
Hammelburg is Jewish from his father's side. He lives in Amsterdam, has a daughter, and is openly gay.

== Electoral history ==
Electoral history of Alexander Hammelburg
Year	Body	Party	Pos.	Votes	Result		Ref.
Year	Body	Party	Pos.	Votes	Party seats	Individual	Ref.
2021	House of Representatives	Democrats 66	23	841	24	Won	
2023	House of Representatives	Democrats 66	20	548	9	Lost	
