= Arno Brok =

Dutch politician (born 1968)

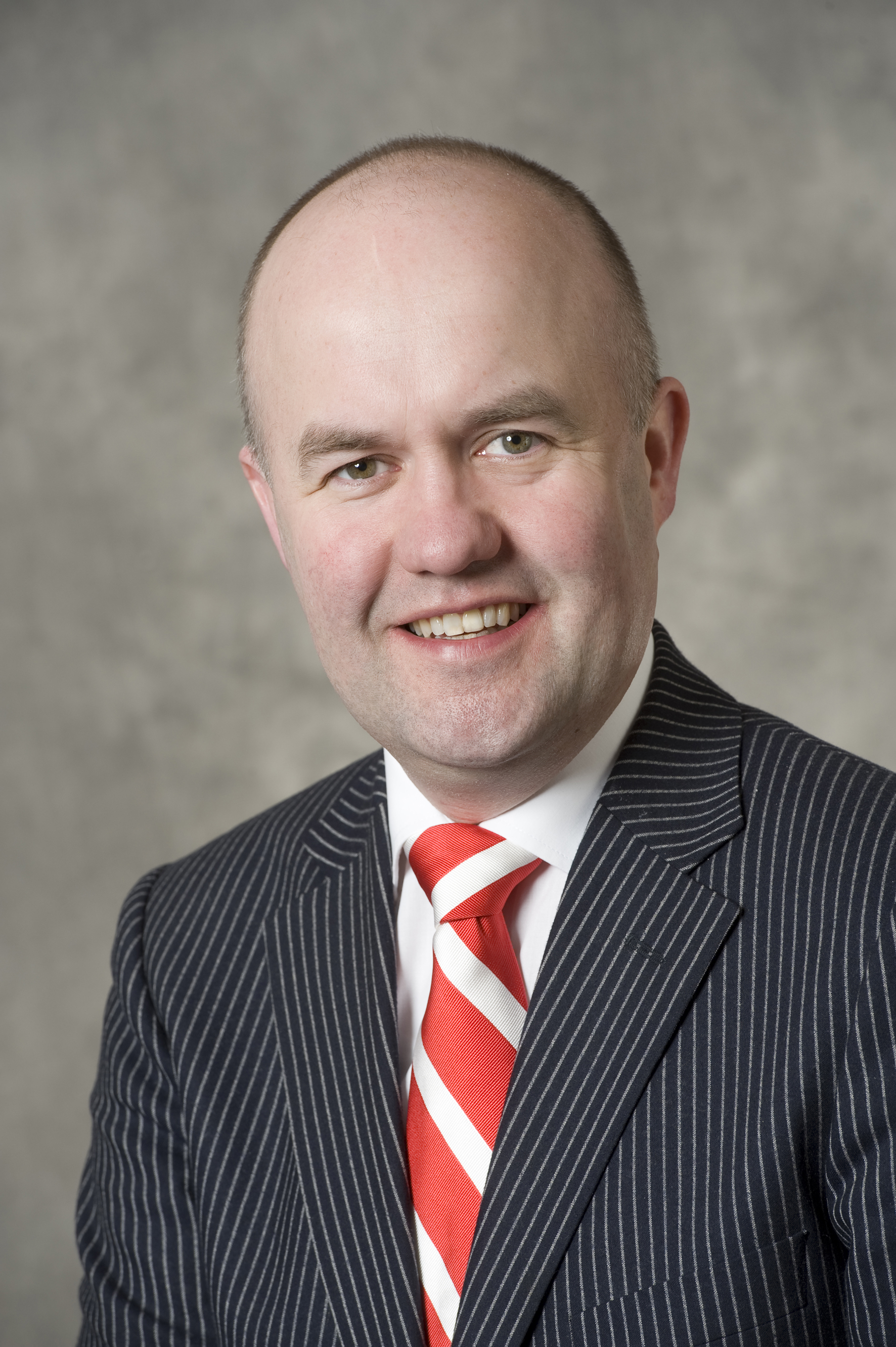
- Arno Brok in 2011

King's Commissioner of Friesland
- Incumbent
- Assumed office 1 March 2017
- Monarch: Willem-Alexander
- Preceded by: John Jorritsma

Mayor of Dordrecht
- In office 1 February 2010 – 1 March 2017
- Preceded by: Ronald Bandell
- Succeeded by: Peter van der Velden

Mayor of Sneek
- In office 1 December 2003 – 1 February 2010
- Preceded by: Siebold Hartkamp
- Succeeded by: Haijo Apotheker

Personal details
- Born: Arnoud Adrianus Maria Brok; 29 July 1968 (age 58) Leerdam, Netherlands
- Party: People's Party for Freedom and Democracy
- Education: Thorbecke Academie (Bachelor of Public Administration); University of Twente (Master of Public Administration)
- Occupation: Politician civil servant

Arnoud Adrianus Maria "Arno" Brok (born 29 July 1968) is a Dutch politician serving as the King's Commissioner of Friesland since 2017. A member of the People's Party for Freedom and Democracy (VVD), he previously served as Mayor of Sneek from 2003 to 2010 and Mayor of Dordrecht from 2010 until 2017.

Arno Brok is one of three openly gay politicians who served as King's Commissioner, the other two are: Clemens Cornielje, and Jan Franssen.

== Decorations ==
Honours
Ribbon bar	Honour	Country	Date	Comment
	Knight of the Order of the Holy Sepulchre	Holy See		
	Officer of the Order of Oranje-Nassau	Netherlands	24 February 2017	

== See also ==
- List of openly LGBT heads of government
- List of LGBT holders of political offices in the Netherlands
