= Jaap Smit =

Dutch politician

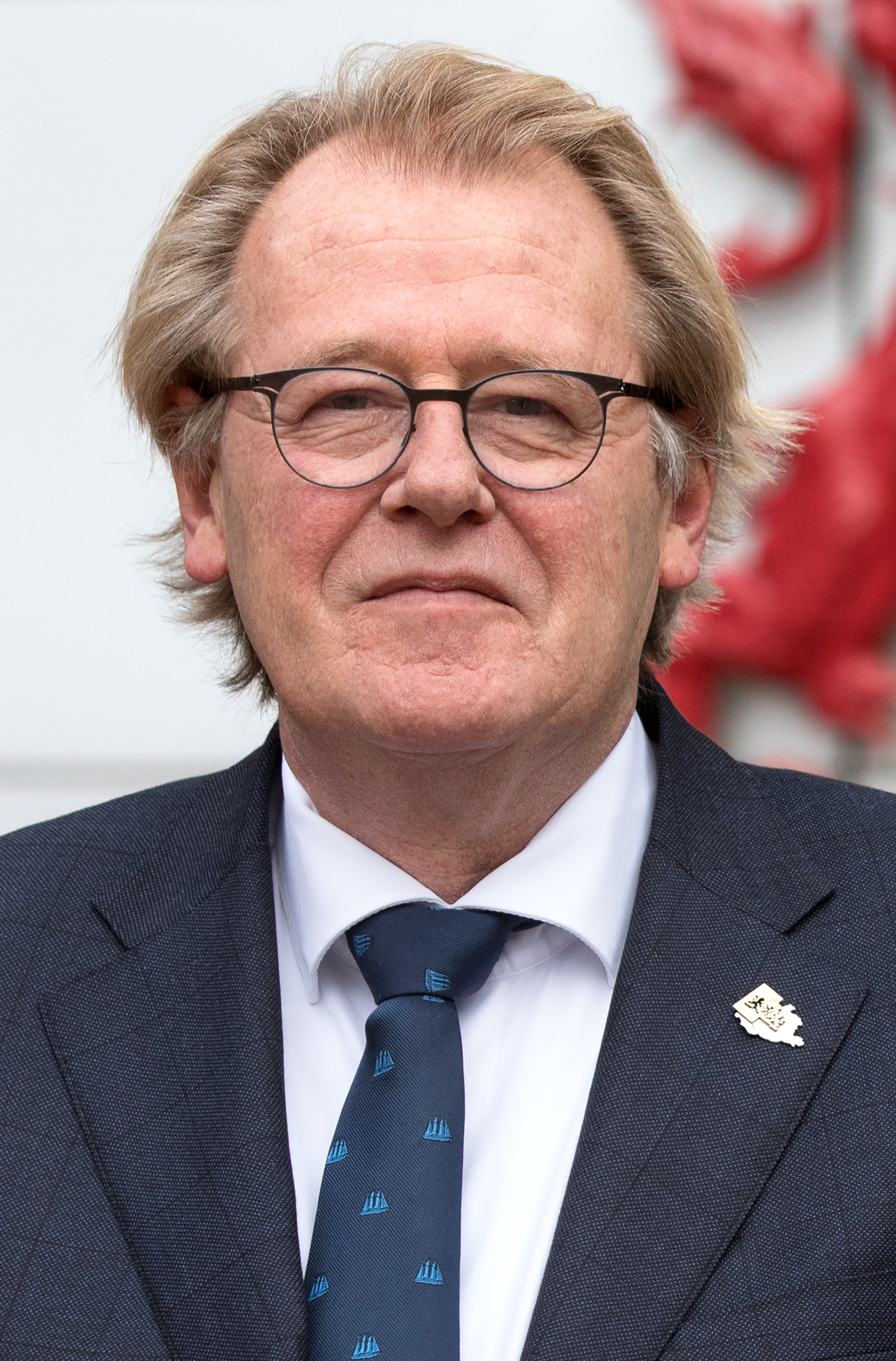

King's Commissioner of South Holland
- In office 1 January 2014 – 1 September 2024
- Monarch: Willem-Alexander
- Preceded by: Jan Franssen
- Succeeded by: Wouter Kolff

Personal details
- Born: 8 March 1957 (age 69) 't Harde, Netherlands
- Party: Christian Democratic Appeal
- Relations: Married
- Education: Leiden University
- Occupation: Politician, trade union leader, preacher, manager
- Website: Province of South Holland website

Jaap Smit (born 8 March 1957) is a Dutch preacher, manager, trade unionist and government official serving as the King's Commissioner of South Holland since 2014. A member of the Christian Democratic Appeal (CDA), he previously led the Christian National Trade Union Federation (CNV) from 2010 to 2014.

== Biography ==
Smit was born in 't Harde, Gelderland in 1957. He went to the Dr. W.A. Visser 't Hooft lyceum in Leiden between 1970 and 1976. He studied theology at Leiden University between 1976 and 1983 with side courses in masscommunication and public relations. In 1979 he already returned to his former lyceum to teach courses in religion and life stance, he continued until 1984. In that year he became a preacher at the Dutch Reformed Church in Ellecom, where he stayed on for four years.

He then became a mental caretaker in the Dutch Army at Seedorf, Lower Saxony in Germany, also for four years. In 1992 he again became a preacher at the Dutch Reformed Church, this time in Heemstede. He stayed on until 1997. In 1994 he started managing, first as a senior manager at KPMG Consulting until 2001, later at IBO Permanent between 2000 and 2005. Between 2001 and 2003 he was also a consultant at Andersson Elffers Felix. From August 2003 until 2010 he was a director at Slachtofferhulp Nederland, a society for victim support. Afterwards he became trade union leader of the Christian National Trade Union Federation, a federation of Christian trade unions. He was in function between June 2010 and 1 January 2014, when he became King's Commissioner of South Holland. He succeeded Jan Franssen, who served two terms of seven years.

At the start of his term he said he would focus on making the province level of government more visible and ensuring that trust of the population would be made a priority.

Political offices
Preceded by Jan Franssen	King's Commissioner of South Holland; 2014–present	Incumbent
