= 1946 Dutch cabinet formation =

Formation of the first Beel cabinet

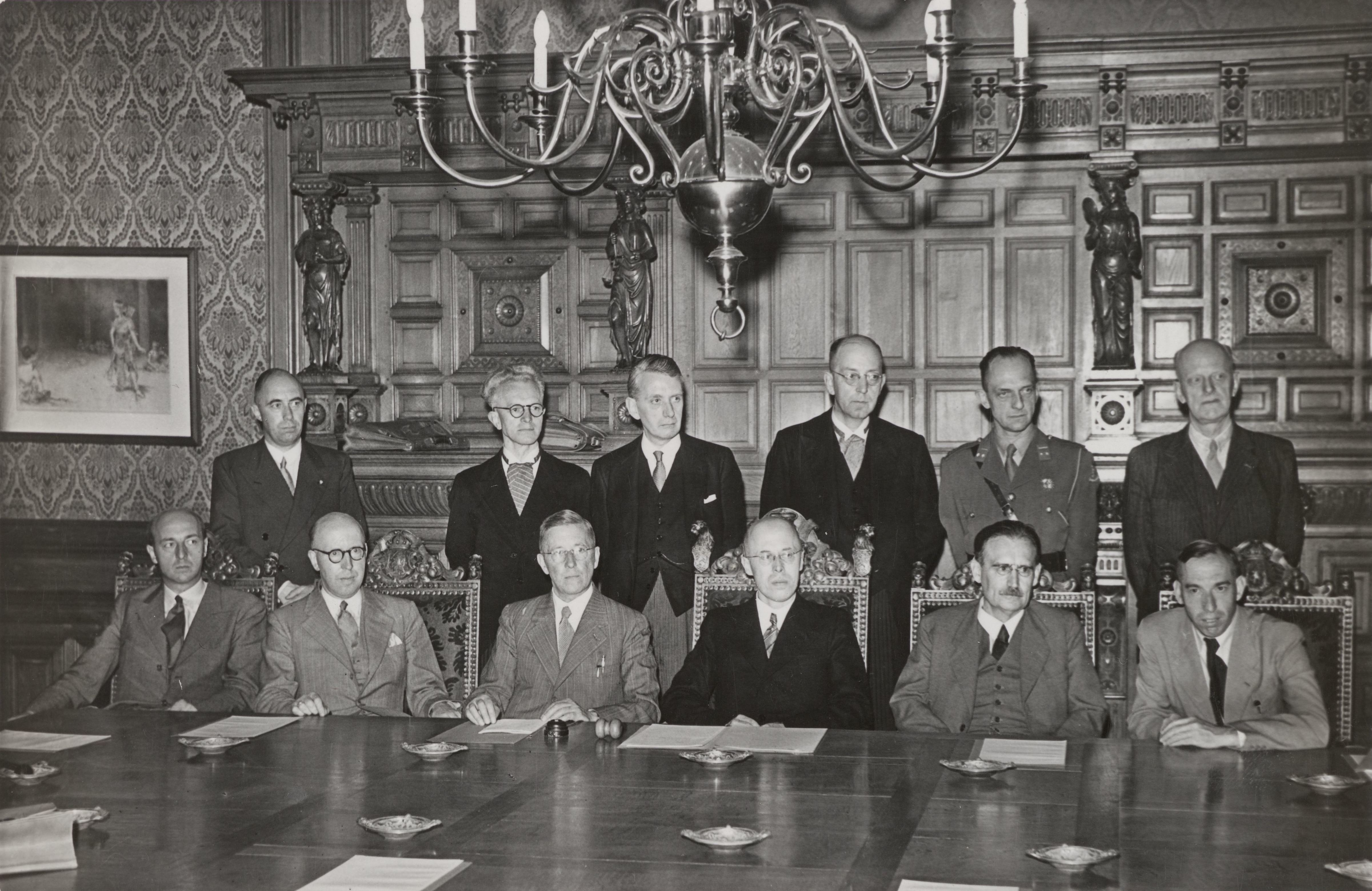
The First Beel cabinet in July 1946. Eelco van Kleffens and Jules Schagen van Leeuwen are absent.

A process of cabinet formation took place following the Dutch general election on 16 May 1946. This resulted in the formation of the first Beel cabinet on 3 July 1946. The coalition was formed by the Catholic People's Party (KVP) and the Labour Party (PvdA).

== Background ==
=== Schemerhorn-Drees cabinet ===
After the liberation from the German occupation in the Netherlands in 1945, Queen Wilhelmina appointed the Schermerhorn-Drees cabinet, consisting of the Roman Catholic State Party (RKSP), the Social Democratic Worker's Party (SDAP) and the Free-thinking Democratic League (VDB). This cabinet was tasked with getting the government back in order after the occupation and prepare for elections.

=== Election ===
Seat composition of the newly elected House of Representatives during the formation. CPN: 10 PvdA: 29 PvdV: 6 ARP: 13 CHU: 8 KVP: 32 SGP: 2

== Formateur Beel ==
The KVP wanted one formateur to be appointed from their party. The PvdA wanted their leader Willem Drees to be appointed as co-formateur. Because the PvdA objected to KVP leader Carl Romme, Romme proposed appointing KVP Minister of the Interior Louis Beel as formateur, despite objection from Beel himself. Wilhelmina accepted this advice and appointed Beel on 27 May. His assignment was to form a cabinet "that can be expected to have the confidence of the House of Representatives".

Beel wrote an extensive program, which he discussed with Romme on 31 May. On 3 June, he then discussed the program with PvdA parliamentary leader Marinus van der Goes van Naters. Van der Goes van Naters objected to involving parties in the coalition other than KVP and PvdA. Other parliamentary leaders Beel spoke to refused as well to participate, because they disagreed with too many points in the program, including on Dutch East Indies. On 17 June, the KVP and PvdA reached an agreement on the program.

Beel wanted to obtain additional information about the policy regarding Dutch East Indies. Together with Drees, he traveled to London on 22 June to speak with the diplomats Alidius Tjarda van Starkenborgh Stachouwer, Edgar Michiels van Verduynen and Eelco van Kleffens. They recommended that the matter be dealt with in the United Nations. Against their advice, Beel and Drees continued to send troops and wanted the British to mediate.

On 1 July, the constitutive deliberation took place and two days later the ministers were sworn in.
