= Sjoerd Potters =

Dutch politician

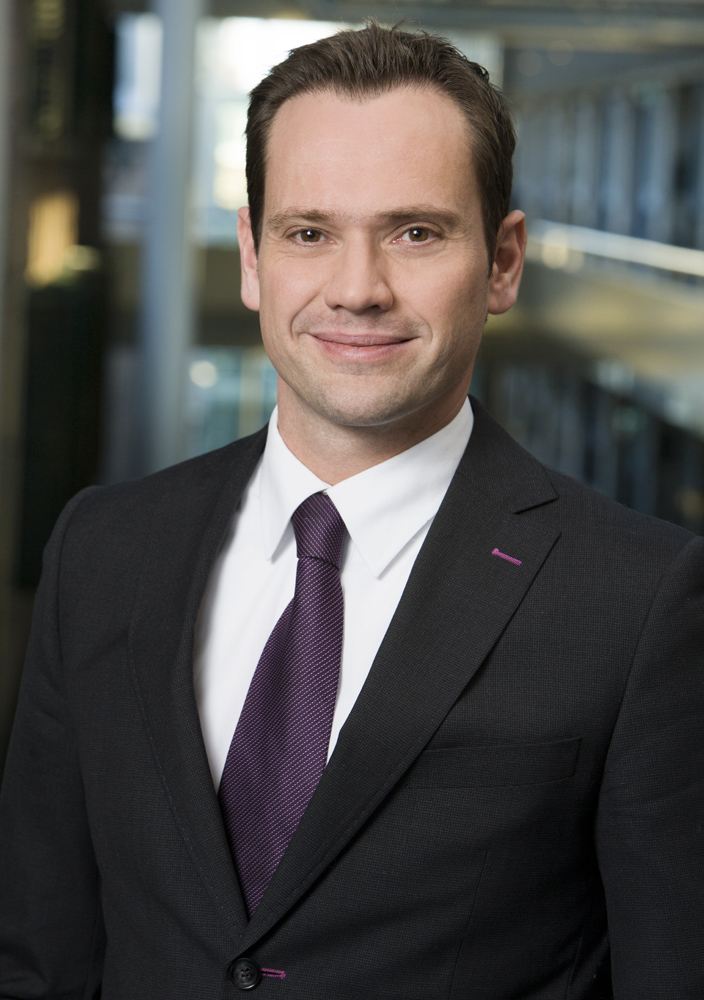
Sjoerd Potters

Sjoerd Cornelis Clemens Maria Potters (born 14 February 1974 in Tilburg) is a Dutch politician. As a member of the People's Party for Freedom and Democracy (Volkspartij voor Vrijheid en Democratie) he was an MP between 8 November 2012 and 23 March 2017. Previously, he was an alderman of Waalwijk from 2010 to 2012.

Between April 2017 and October 2024, he was the mayor of De Bilt, and has been mayor of Helmond since November 2024.
