= Capelsebrug metro station =

Metro station in Rotterdam, Netherlands

Capelsebrug
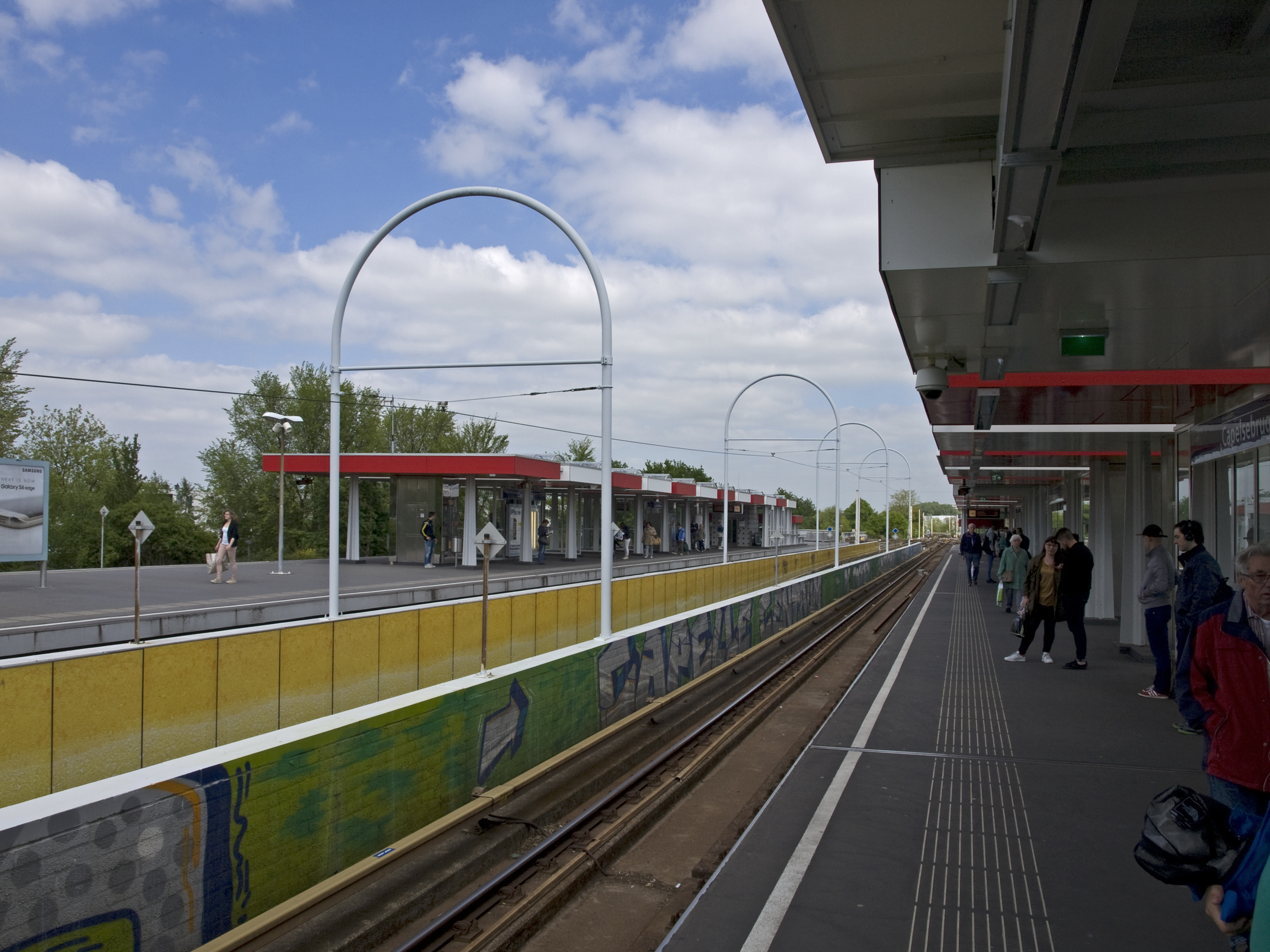

General information
- Coordinates: 51°57′26″N 4°32′58″E
- System: Rotterdam Metro station
- Owner: RET
- Platforms: Island platform
- Tracks: 3

History
- Opened: 1982

Services
Preceding station	Rotterdam Metro	Following station
Kralingse Zoom towards Vlaardingen West	Line A Not on evenings and early weekend mornings	Schenkel towards Binnenhof
Kralingse Zoom Terminus	Line A Evenings and early weekend mornings only	Schenkel towards Binnenhof
Kralingse Zoom towards Hoek van Holland Strand	Line B	Schenkel towards Nesselande
Kralingse Zoom towards De Akkers	Line C	Slotlaan towards De Terp
Location

Capelsebrug is a station on lines A, B, and C of the Rotterdam Metro. The station is situated in the eastern part of Rotterdam in the Netherlands, at the boundary with Capelle aan den IJssel municipality. At Capelsebrug station, lines A and B turn north towards Schenkel station, while line C continues east towards Slotlaan station.

The westbound trains stop at either side of an island platform between two running tracks, while all eastbound trains share one platform. Near the station there's a Cafetaria, and a supermarket.

This station was opened in 1982, and was the eastern terminus of the line (then called the Caland line), until it was extended towards Binnenhof station one year later. In 1994, the Capelle a/d IJssel branch (nowadays line C) was added, connecting Capelsebrug station with De Terp station.

On 9 September 2019, a man was stabbed to death by another man on the platform of the metro station. The stabbing followed a disagreement about travelling without a ticket.
