= Eddie van Marum =

Dutch politician (born 1968)

State Secretary for Digitalisation, Kingdom Relations and Reparations for Groningen (Note: Known as State Secretary for Reparations for Groningen before 19 June 2025)
- In office 2 July 2024 – 22 February 2026
- Prime Minister: Dick Schoof
- Minister: Judith Uitermark; Frank Rijkaart
- Preceded by: Hans Vijlbrief (Note: As State Secretary for the Extractive Industries); Zsolt Szabó (Note: As State Secretary for Kingdom Relations and Digitalisation)

Member of the Provincial Council of Groningen
- In office 29 March 2023 – 2024

Personal details
- Born: Eltje van Marum; 25 May 1968 (age 58)
- Party: Farmer–Citizen Movement
- Domestic partner: Gert
- Children: 1 son; 2 stepdaughters
- Occupation: Politician; pest control expert; fauna expert; counter-expert; funeral arranger

Eltje "Eddie" van Marum (Dutch: [ˈɛltɕə ˈʔɛdi vɑ ˈmaːrʏm]; born 1968) is a Dutch politician of the Farmer–Citizen Movement (BBB). He served as State Secretary for Reparations for Groningen in the Schoof cabinet between July 2024 and February 2026.

== Career ==
Van Marum has held jobs as musk rat control expert, fauna expert, counter-expert in damage assessment, and funeral arranger.

He became a member of the Provincial Council of Groningen following March 2023 provincial elections, and he was subsequently involved in the formation of a governing coalition. Van Marum focused on agriculture, fishery, nature, water, and earthquake damage caused by gas extraction from the Groningen gas field. He has spoken out against political polarization, and he opposed the "strict implementation of European Union directives and rules."

After the PVV, VVD, NSC, and BBB formed the Schoof cabinet, Van Marum was sworn in as State Secretary for Reparations for Groningen on 2 July 2024. He is responsible for addressing the aftermath of earthquakes induced by former gas extraction from the Groningen field.

After the PVV left the cabinet in June 2025, Van Marum also assumed responsibility for Kingdom Relations and Digitalisation from Zsolt Szabó.

== Personal life ==
As of 2024, his boyfriend was called Gert. He has one son, from a previous relationship, and two stepdaughters.

== Electoral history ==
Electoral history of Eddie van Marum
Year	Body	Party	Pos.	Votes	Result		Ref.
Year	Body	Party	Pos.	Votes	Party seats	Individual	Ref.
2024	European Parliament	Farmer–Citizen Movement	20	2,860	2	Lost	
2025	House of Representatives	Farmer–Citizen Movement	14	796	4	Lost	

== Notes ==
Political offices
Preceded by Hans Vijlbrief	State Secretary for Reparations for Groningen; 2024–2026
