= Hans Gispen =

Dutch politician (1905–1968)

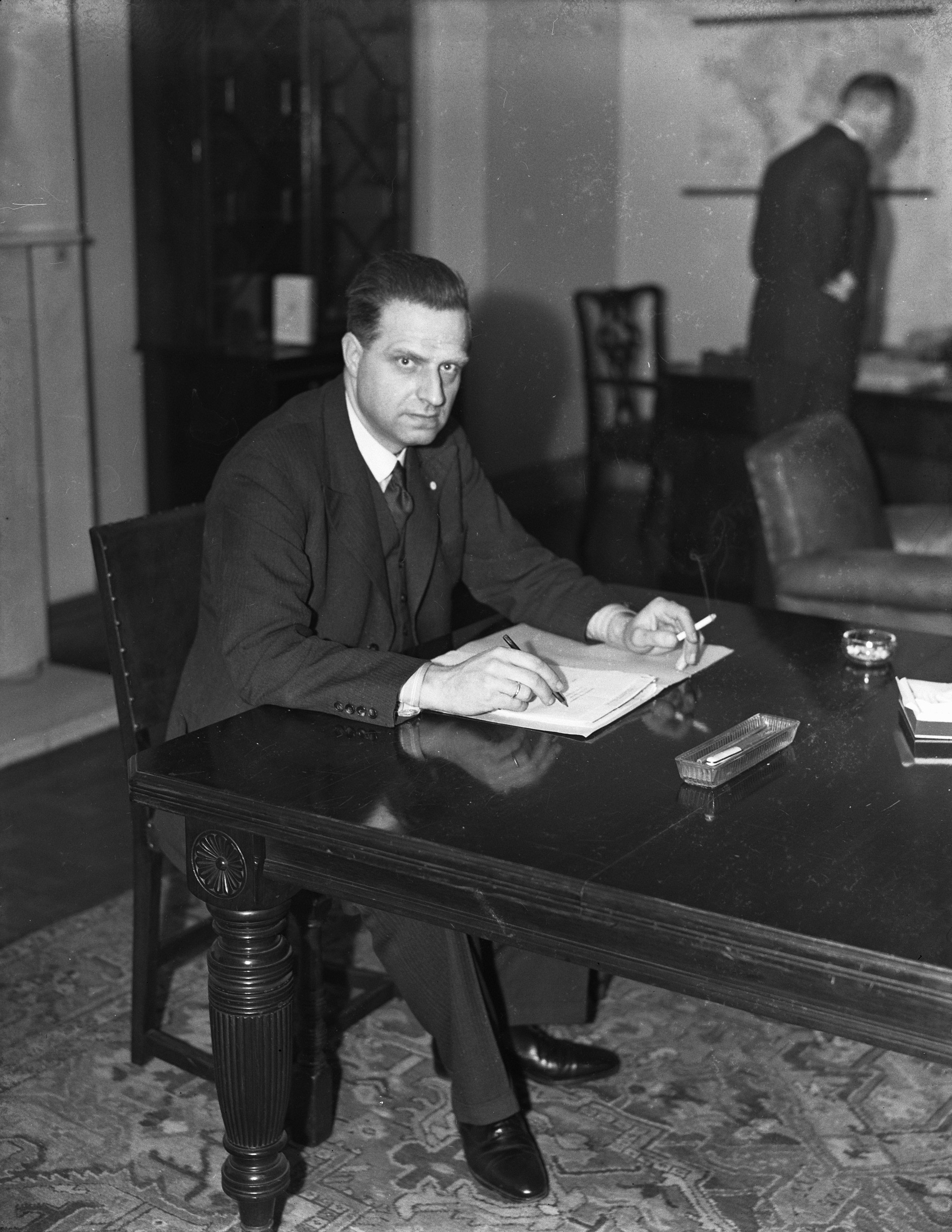
Hans Gispen (1945)

Johannes Hendrik (Hans) Gispen (1905 – 1968) was a Dutch politician. Before he entered politics he was a director of Organon.
