= Vlissingen train accident =

1899 railway incident in the Netherlands

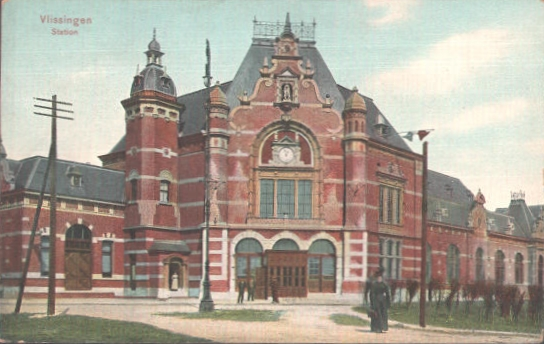
- The station of Vlissingen, where the accident occurred.

- Location within Netherlands

Details
- Date: 2 June 1899
- Location: Vlissingen, Netherlands
- Coordinates: 51°26′39″N 3°35′44″E
- Country: Netherlands
- Incident type: Derailment
- Cause: Brake failure

Statistics
- Trains: 1
- Deaths: 3
- Injured: 2

The Vlissingen train accident took place on 2 June 1899 in Vlissingen, Netherlands when a passenger train derailed upon ramming the buffer stop of the Vlissingen station after their brakes failed to operate properly, resulting in the deaths of 3 people with a further 2 injured.

== Accident ==
Passenger train number 87 left the Amsterdam Centraal station at 7.15 pm on 2 June 1899 on a voyage to Vlissingen station, which was the final destination of the journey as the track halted there, indicated by the station's buffer stops. Nearing their destination, the train operator noticed that the brakes didn't respond. Without any means to slow the train down, the operator sounded the train whistle multiple times to warn the people standing on the platform it was headed for. The platform was quickly evacuated as the train sped into the station. At the last second, the train operator and the fireman jumped from the speeding train, injuring themselves, but not before the operator had opened the steam valves so steam could escape the train's boiler, preventing an explosion in the inevitable collision.

The locomotive plowed into the buffer stop at the end of the track at 10.57 pm, launching it up the one meter high platform and a further three meters into the air before plowing through the station's dining area and into the platform itself. A goods wagon behind the locomotive was crushed and the mail wagon adjacent to it was ripped in half. The passenger wagons of the train were saved from destruction thanks to a broken link between the wagons, and stayed on the tracks, coming to a halt following the collision and leaving its occupants unharmed.

== Aftermath ==
The accident killed two train conductors and following clean-up operations the following day, a third victim was discovered, the daughter of Swiss politician Arnold Roth had been the only occupant of the female first class section in the post wagon. The damages to the station and train were severe and it took several days to clear-out all the debry from the station. The cause of the brake failure had been because the brake pressure had drained out of the pipes by an unknown cause.

== See also ==
- List of rail accidents in the Netherlands
