= Laura Bromet =

Dutch politician (born 1970)

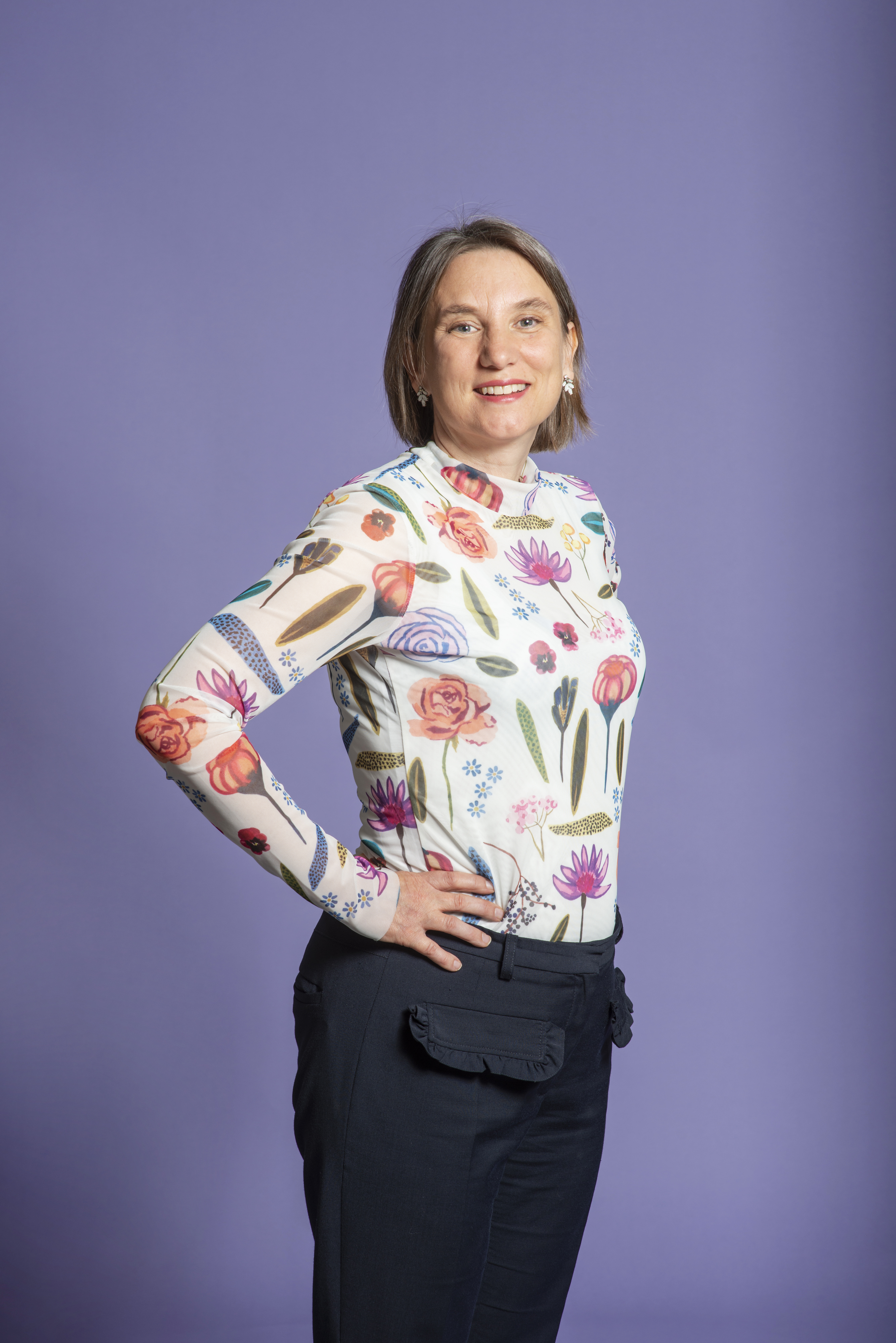
- Bromet in 2020

Member of the House of Representatives
- Incumbent
- Assumed office 7 June 2018
- Preceded by: Rik Grashoff

Alderwoman in Waterland
- In office 24 April 2014 – 15 May 2018

Member of the Waterland Municipal Council
- In office 16 March 2006 – 24 April 2014

Personal details
- Born: 17 January 1970 (age 56) Purmerend, Netherlands
- Party: GroenLinks (until 2026); PRO (from 2026)
- Children: 4
- Education: University of Amsterdam
- Occupation: Journalist • Politician

Laura Bromet (born 17 January 1970) is a Dutch journalist and politician who serves in the House of Representatives as a member of Progressief Nederland (PRO), formerly GroenLinks, since 2018. Prior to her tenure in the House of Representatives she was active in the local politics of Waterland.

== Early life and education ==
Laura Bromet was born in Purmerend, Netherlands, on 17 January 1970, to Frans Bromet She grew up Ilpendam. She received her secondary education at VWO St. Ignatius College. She graduated with a degree in Dutch and literature from the University of Amsterdam (UvA) after attending from 1989 to 1995, cultural studies after attending UvA from 1991 to 1995, and studied law at Vrije Universiteit Amsterdam in 1997, but did not graduate.

== Career ==
Bromet worked as a journalist for Noordhollands Dagblad from 1989 to 1999, a member of Het Waterschap's editorial advisory board since 2020, and a member of the editorial staff of GroenLinks' (GL) magazine. She taught Dutch and geography at Luzac College in 1996. In 1996, she was the secretary of the ING Group.

In Waterland Bromet served on the municipal council from 16 March 2006 to 24 April 2014, and as an alderwoman from 24 April 2014 to 15 May 2018. She was the leader of GL in the council from 2008 to 2014.

Bromet became a member of the House of Representatives as a member of GL in 2018. She also became a member of the Labour Party (PvdA) in 2023. During Bromet's tenure in parliament she was chair of the European Affairs committee from 11 February 2022 to 3 October 2024, and Education, Culture and Science committee since 24 September 2024.

== Personal life ==
Bromet is married and is the mother of four children.

== Electoral history ==
Electoral history of Laura Bromet
Year	Body	Party	Pos.	Votes	Result		Ref.
Year	Body	Party	Pos.	Votes	Party seats	Individual	Ref.
2017	House of Representatives	GroenLinks	15	8,686	14	Lost (Note: Bromet was appointed to the body later during the term due to a vacancy.)	
2021	House of Representatives	GroenLinks	4	23,666	8	Won	
2023	House of Representatives	GroenLinks–PvdA	11	19,518	25	Won	
2025	House of Representatives	GroenLinks–PvdA	9	13,370	20	Won	

== Works cited ==
- "Drs. L. (Laura) Bromet". States General of the Netherlands. Archived from the original on 22 June 2025.
- "Laura Bromet". House of Representatives. Archived from the original on 22 June 2025.
