= De Terp metro station =

Metro station in Capelle aan den IJssel, Netherlands

De Terp
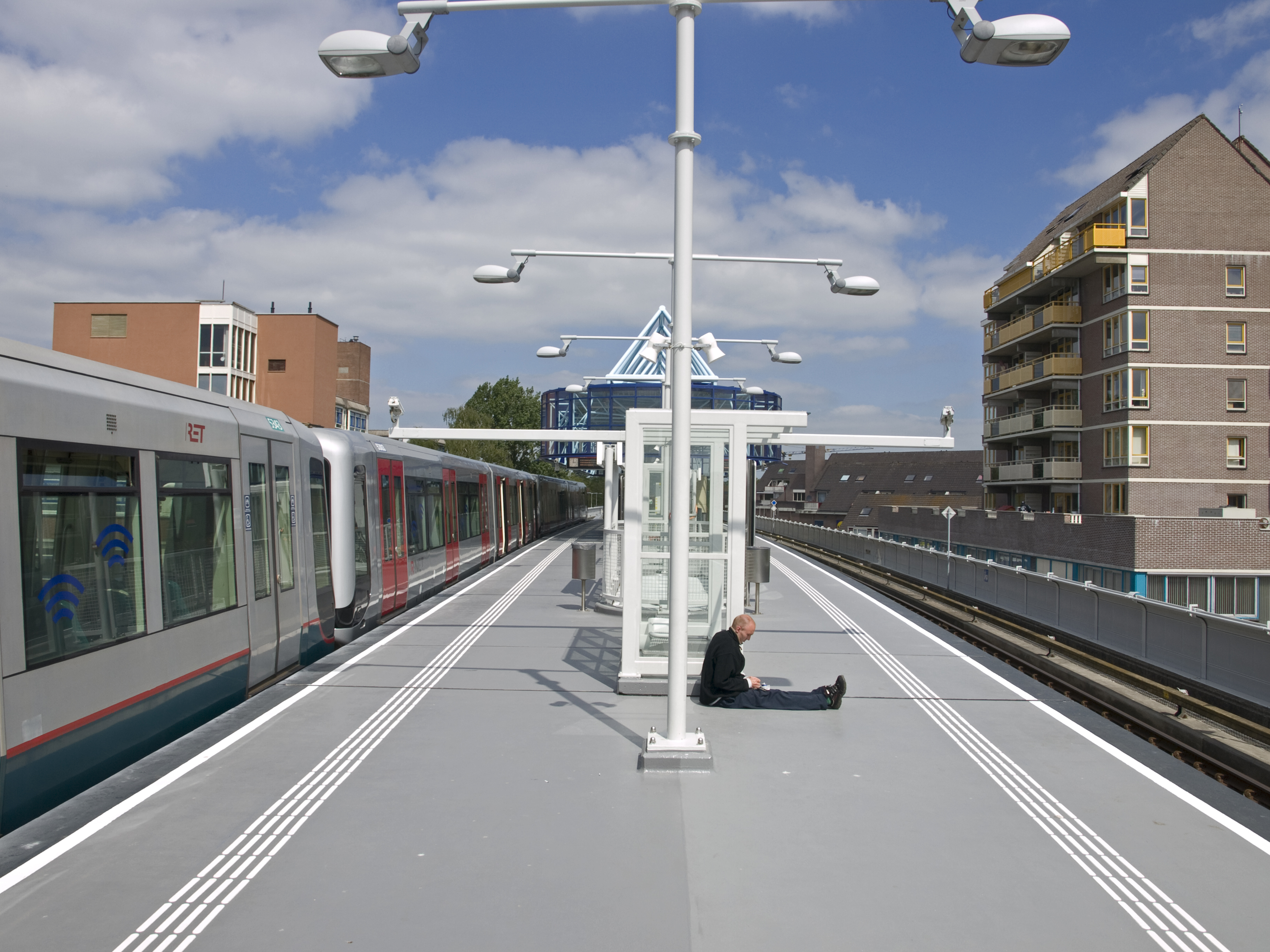
- The platform

General information
- Coordinates: 51°56′9.47″N 4°36′1.7″E
- System: Rotterdam Metro station
- Owner: RET
- Platforms: Island platform
- Tracks: 2

History
- Opened: 1994

Services
Preceding station	Rotterdam Metro	Following station
Capelle Centrum towards De Akkers	Line C	Terminus
Location

De Terp is a subway station on Line C of the Rotterdam Metro and is situated in the town of Capelle aan den IJssel, in the Oostgaarde area, just east of Rotterdam. It is the northern terminus of the line.

The station was opened on 26 May 1994 as part of the extension of the East-West Line or Caland Line from Capelsebrug station. The station consists of an island platform between two tracks. Near the Subway station is Shopping Mall De Terp. Also RET Bus 31 to Rotterdam Alexander stops every half-hour near the station.
