= Heemraadlaan metro station =

Metro station in Spijkenisse, Netherlands

Heemraadlaan
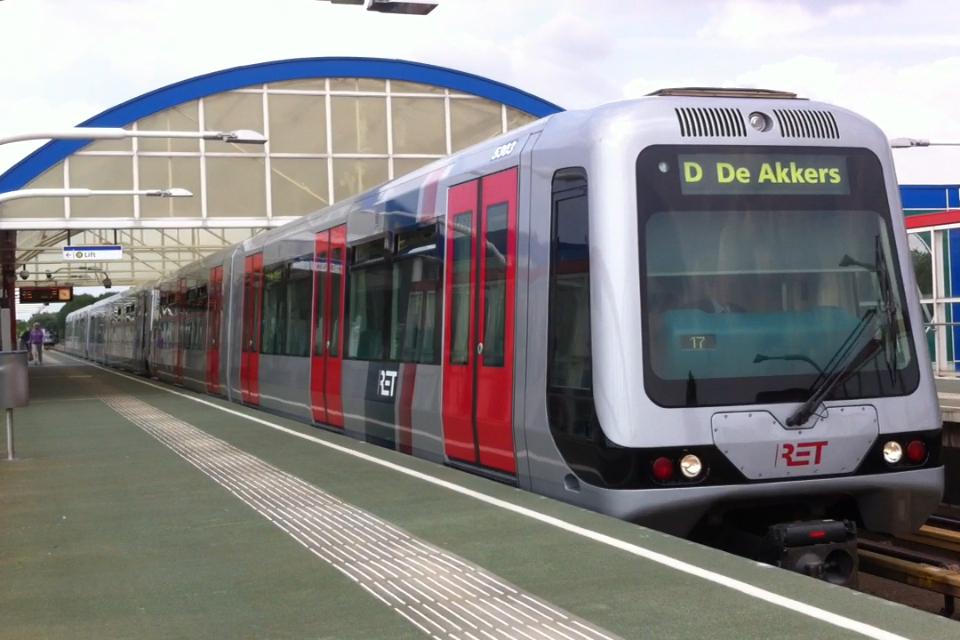

General information
- Coordinates: 51°50′16″N 4°19′54″E
- System: Rotterdam Metro station
- Owner: RET
- Platforms: Side platforms
- Tracks: 2

Construction
- Structure type: Elevated

History
- Opened: 1985

Services
Preceding station	Rotterdam Metro	Following station
De Akkers Terminus	Line C	Spijkenisse Centrum towards De Terp
De Akkers Terminus	Line D	Spijkenisse Centrum towards Rotterdam Centraal
Location

Heemraadlaan is one of three (above-ground) subway stations in the Dutch city of Spijkenisse. Architect Carel Weeber was critically acclaimed for his design of the three stations. The Heemraadlaan station is the penultimate stop for trains of Rotterdam Metro lines C and D and features two side platforms. The station is named for the large thoroughfare above which it is built.

== History ==
The station was opened on 25 April 1985. On that date, the North-South Line (currently operated by line D trains) was extended from its former terminus, Zalmplaat station, towards its current terminus, De Akkers station. Since the East-West Line was connected to the North-South Line in November 2002, trains of what is currently line C also call at the station.

In 2022 a Metro pillar street art project intervened the pillars of the metro line between Heemraadlaan and Spijkenisse Centrum focussing on diversity and nature.

== Map ==
Metro Rotterdam future
