= Hoogvliet metro station =

Metro station in Rotterdam, Netherlands

Hoogvliet
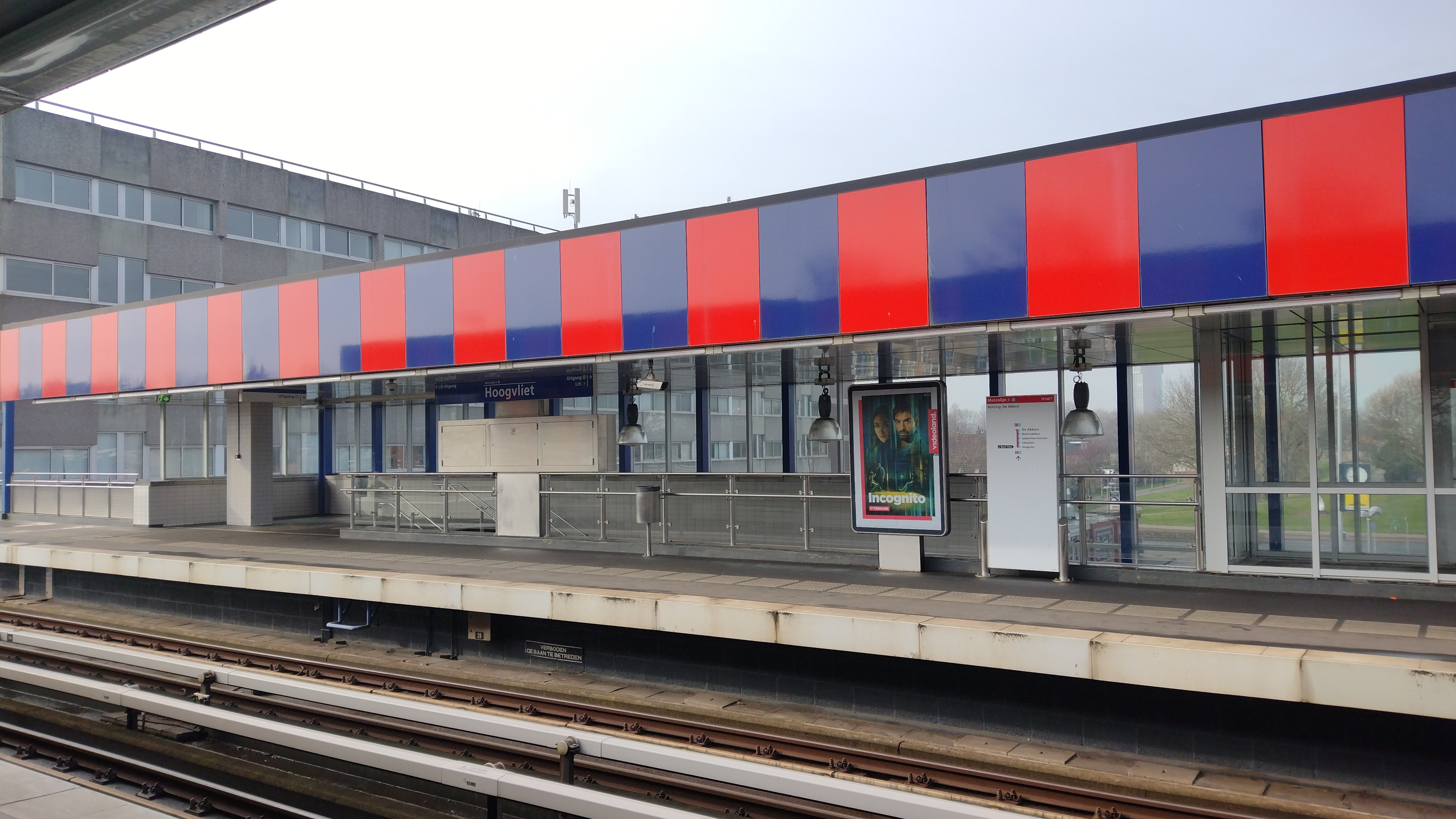

General information
- Coordinates: 51°51′38″N 4°22′0″E
- System: Rotterdam Metro station
- Owner: RET
- Platforms: Side platforms
- Tracks: 2

Construction
- Structure type: Elevated

History
- Opened: 1974

Services
| Preceding station | Rotterdam Metro | Following station |
|---|---|---|
| Zalmplaat towards De Akkers | Line C | Tussenwater towards De Terp |
| Zalmplaat towards De Akkers | Line D | Tussenwater towards Rotterdam Centraal |
Location

Hoogvliet is an above-ground subway station of the Rotterdam Metro lines C and D. The station is located in the borough Hoogvliet in Rotterdam and features two side platforms.

The station was opened on 25 October 1974. On that date, the North-South Line (currently operated by line D trains) was extended from its former terminus, Slinge, towards Zalmplaat station. Since the East-West Line was connected to the North-South Line in November 2002, trains of what is currently line C also call at Hoogvliet station.
