= Tussenwater metro station =

Tussenwater
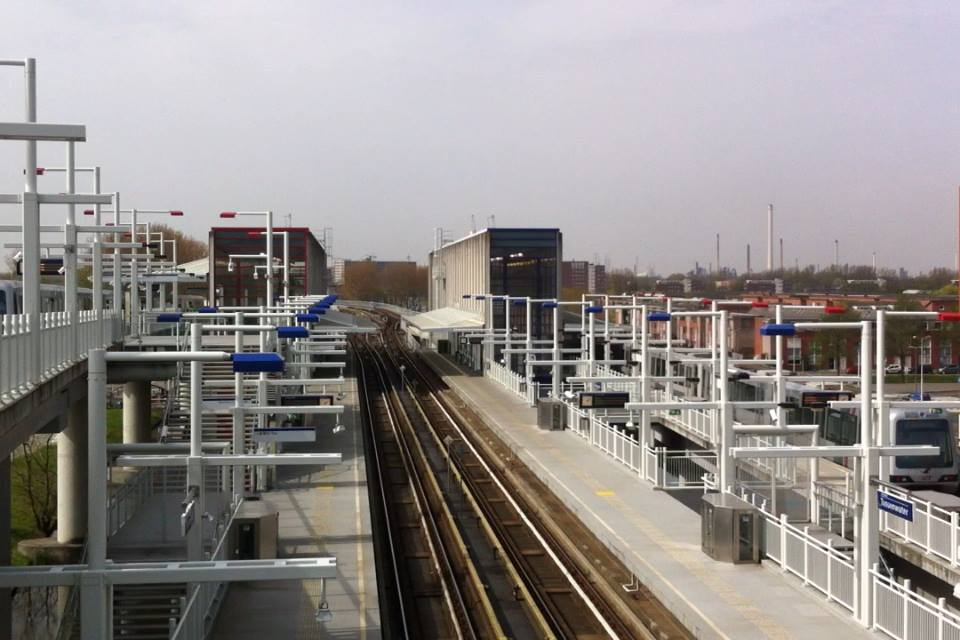

General information
- Coordinates: 51°51′45.92″N 4°22′35.25″E
- System: Rotterdam Metro station
- Owner: RET
- Platforms: 1 Island platforms 2 side platforms
- Tracks: 4

Construction
- Structure type: Elevated
- Parking: Free
- Cycle facilities: Limited covered parking

History
- Opened: 2002

Services
Preceding station	Rotterdam Metro	Following station
Hoogvliet towards De Akkers	Line C	Pernis towards De Terp
Hoogvliet towards De Akkers	Line D	Poortugaal towards Rotterdam Centraal
Location

Tussenwater is an above-ground subway station of the Rotterdam Metro lines C and D. The station is located in the borough Hoogvliet in Rotterdam.

The station is situated just before the tracks of lines C and D split. Because of this, the station has four running tracks, which are situated along three platforms. The northern two tracks (for southbound/westbound trains) share one platform, while the southern two tracks each have their own platform. Because the line C track passes the line D tracks on a fly-over just east of the station, the platform for the eastbound line C trains is located higher than the other platforms.

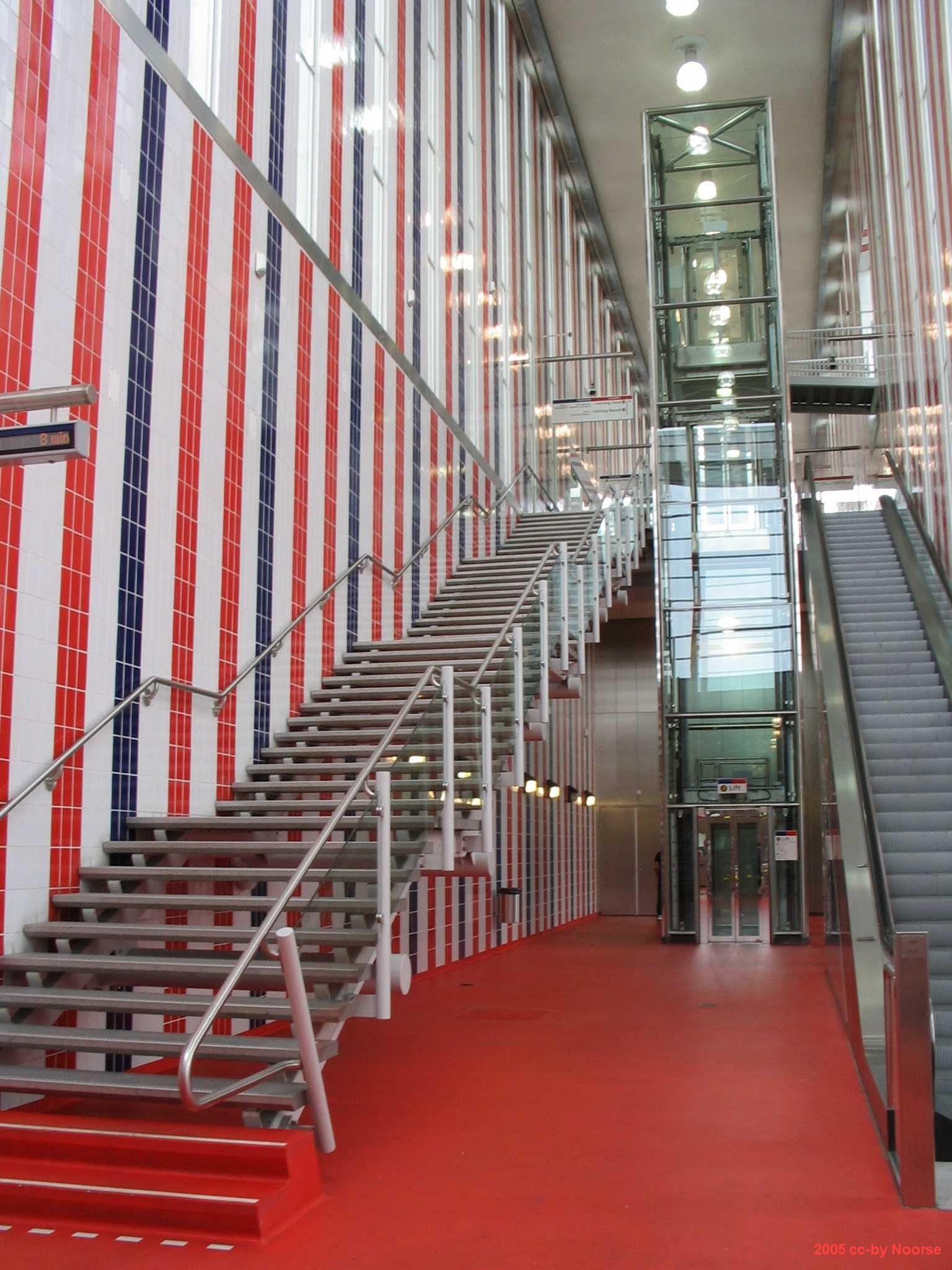
Stairs in Tussenwater station
