= Wilhelminaplein metro station =

Metro station in Rotterdam, Netherlands

Wilhelminaplein
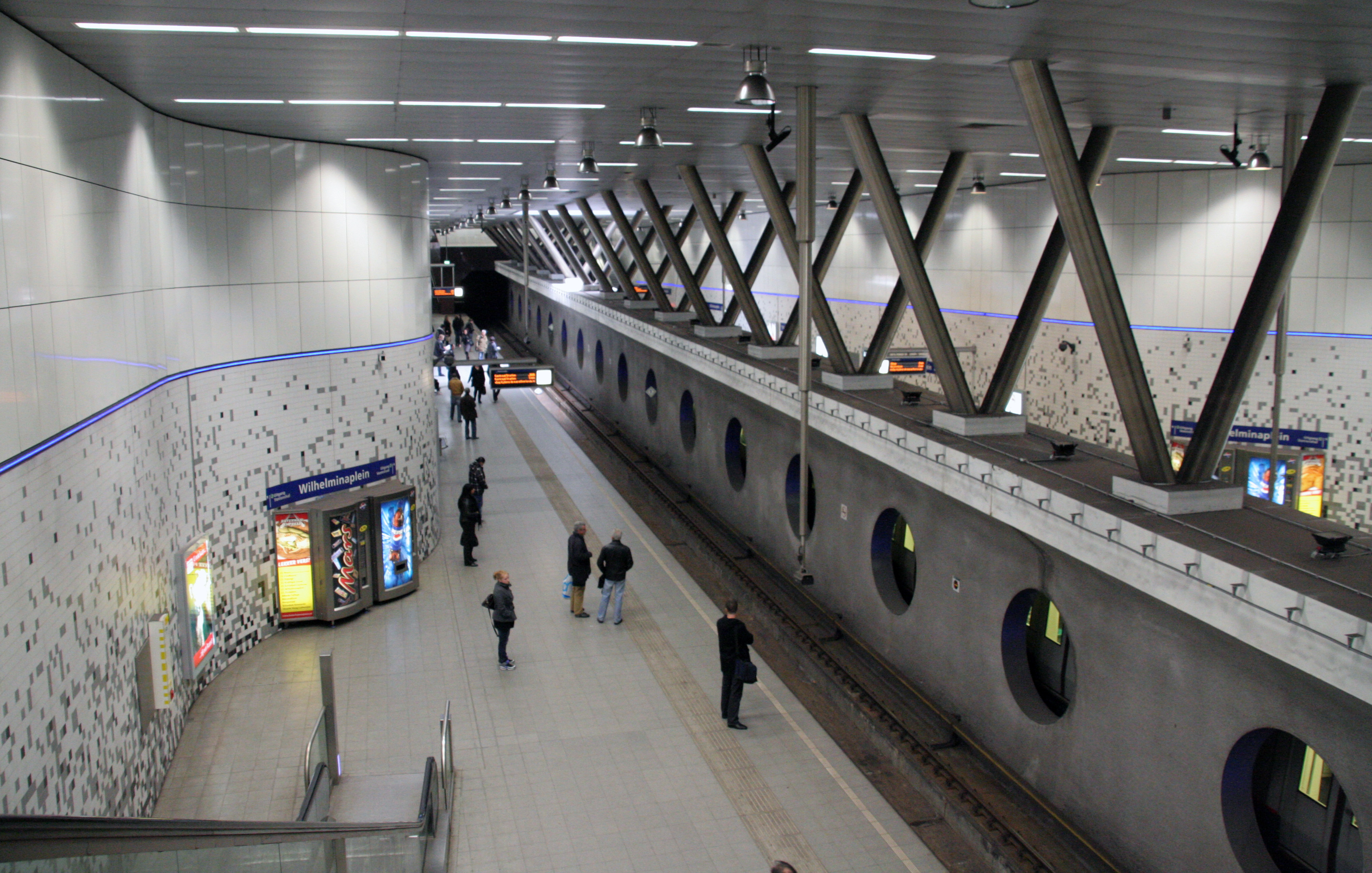
- Platform for northbound trains

General information
- Coordinates: 51°54′26″N 4°29′38″E
- System: Rotterdam Metro station
- Owner: RET
- Platforms: Side platforms
- Tracks: 2

Construction
- Structure type: Underground

History
- Opened: 1997

Services
Preceding station	Rotterdam Metro	Following station
Rijnhaven towards De Akkers	Line D	Leuvehaven towards Rotterdam Centraal
Rijnhaven towards Slinge	Line E	Leuvehaven towards Den Haag Centraal
Location

Wilhelminaplein is an underground subway station in Rotterdam, Netherlands, which lies south of the Maas river. It is part of Rotterdam Metro lines D and E.

Wilhelminaplein station was opened in 1997 as a new infill station of the North-South Line, which itself was already opened in 1968. Because the station was constructed at the location where the metro tunnel is going up on its way to the surface, the platforms, like the rest of the station, are not entirely horizontal.

Near the main entrance of the station, a Rotterdam tram stop is located, allowing interchange with RET-operated tram lines 20, 23 and 25. A connection to RET-bus line 60 towards the Wilhelminakade is also available.

An entrance was opened in 2005 for visitors to the Nieuwe Luxor Theater, which leads passengers directly to the other side of the busy intersection of Wilhelminaplein and Posthumalaan by moving walkways.

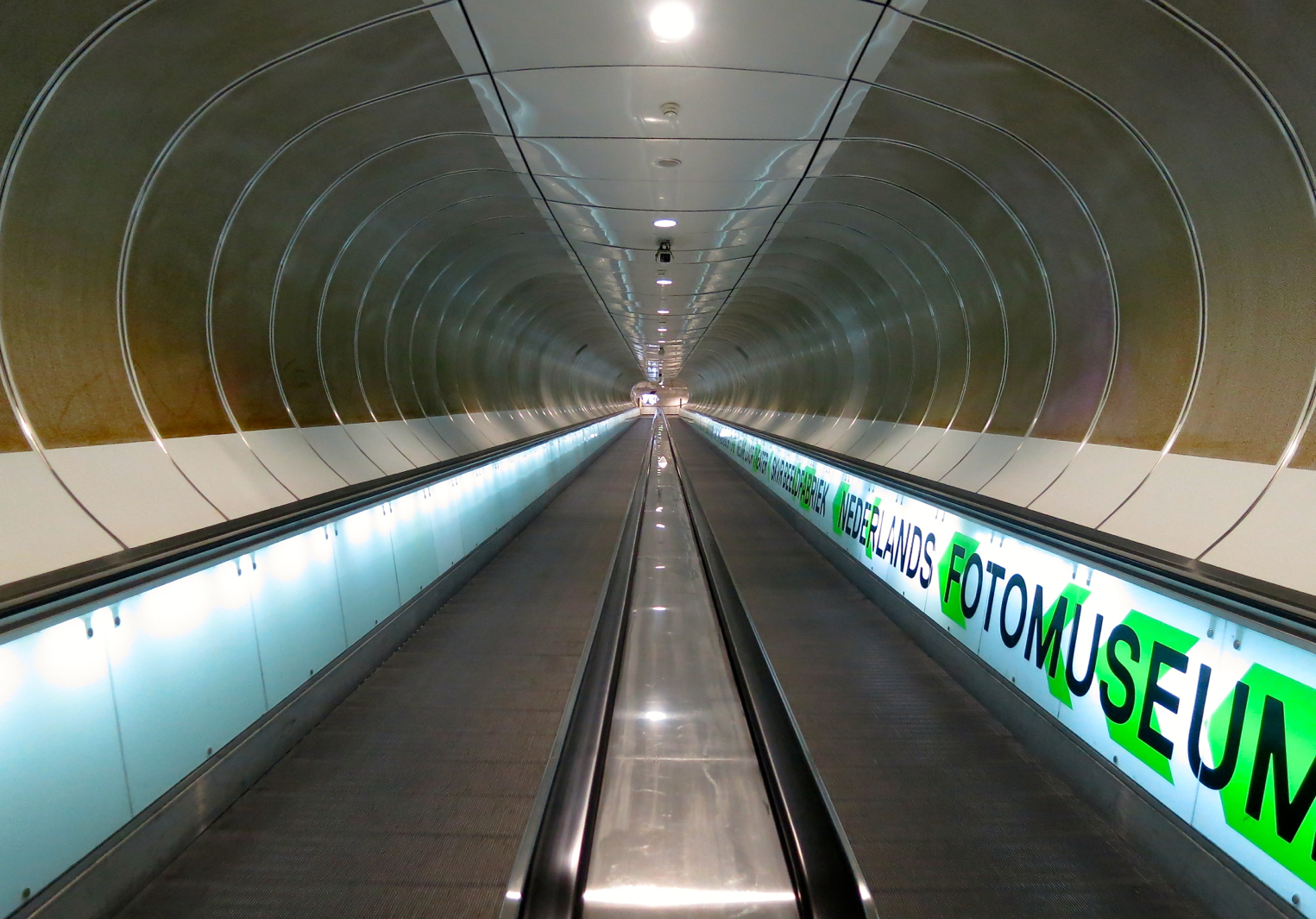
Moving walkways between station and theater
