= Zalmplaat metro station =

Metro station in Rotterdam, Netherlands

Zalmplaat
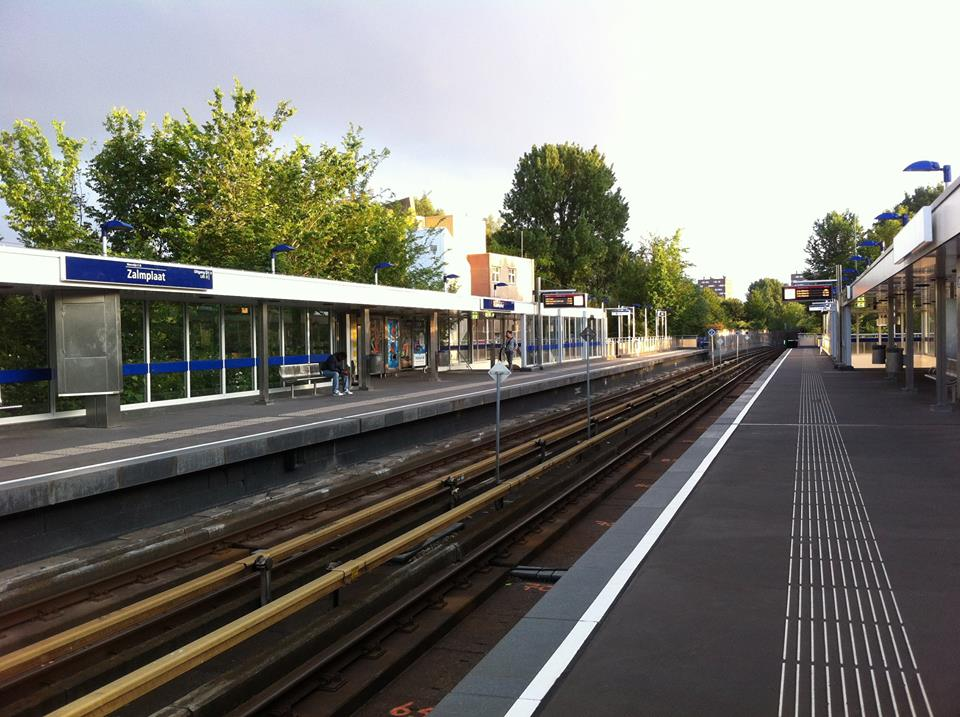

General information
- Coordinates: 51°51′19″N 4°21′46″E
- System: Rotterdam Metro station
- Owner: RET
- Platforms: Side platforms
- Tracks: 2

Construction
- Structure type: Elevated

History
- Opened: 1974

Services
Preceding station	Rotterdam Metro	Following station
Spijkenisse Centrum towards De Akkers	Line C	Hoogvliet towards De Terp
Spijkenisse Centrum towards De Akkers	Line D	Hoogvliet towards Rotterdam Centraal
Location

Zalmplaat is an above-ground subway station of the Rotterdam Metro lines C and D. The station is located in the borough Hoogvliet in Rotterdam and features two side platforms.

The station was opened on 25 October 1974. On that date, the North-South Line (currently operated by line D trains) was extended from its former terminus, Slinge, towards Zalmplaat station. Until the line was extended further towards De Akkers in 1985, Zalmplaat was the southern terminus of the line. Since the East-West Line was connected to the North-South Line in November 2002, trains of what is currently line C also call at the station.
