= Pernis metro station =

Metro station in Rotterdam, Netherlands

Pernis
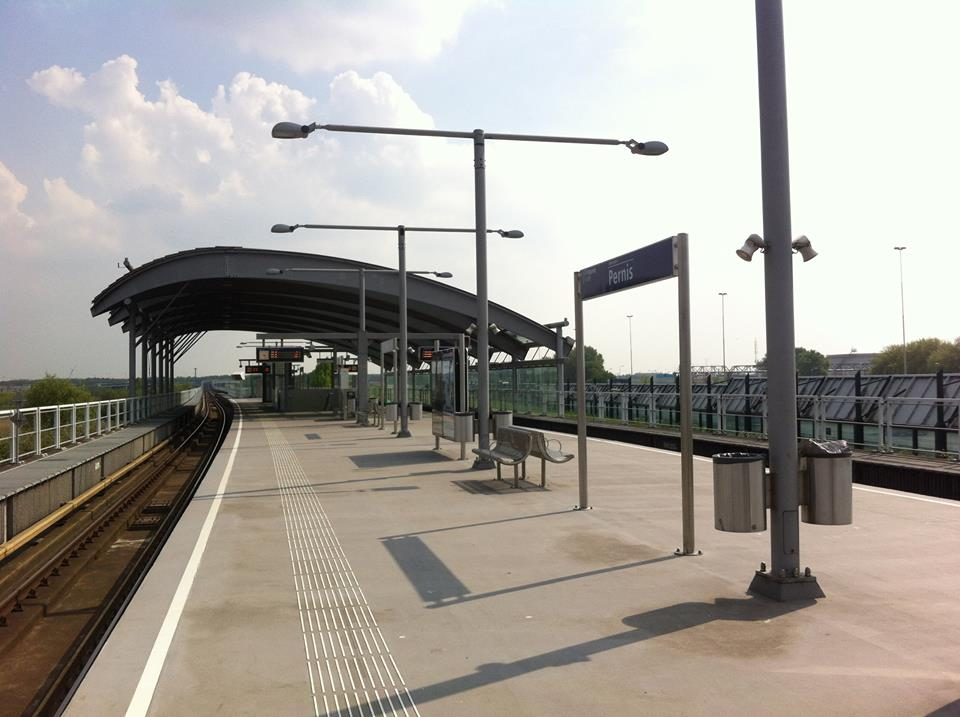
- Pernis station platform

General information
- Location: Pernis, Netherlands
- Coordinates: 51°53′6″N 4°22′55″E
- System: Rotterdam Metro station
- Owner: RET
- Platforms: Island platform
- Tracks: 2

Construction
- Structure type: Elevated

History
- Opened: 2002

Services
Preceding station	Rotterdam Metro	Following station
Tussenwater towards De Akkers	Line C	Vijfsluizen towards De Terp
Location

Pernis is an above-ground metro station of the Rotterdam Metro Line C. The station is located in the village of Pernis, near the centre of Rotterdam.

The station was opened in November 2002, as a result of an extension of the East-West Line (also formerly called Caland line). This extension connected the former terminus Marconiplein to the North-South Line (also Erasmus line) at Tussenwater station.
