= Spijkenisse Centrum metro station =

Metro station in Spijkenisse, Netherlands

Spijkenisse Centrum
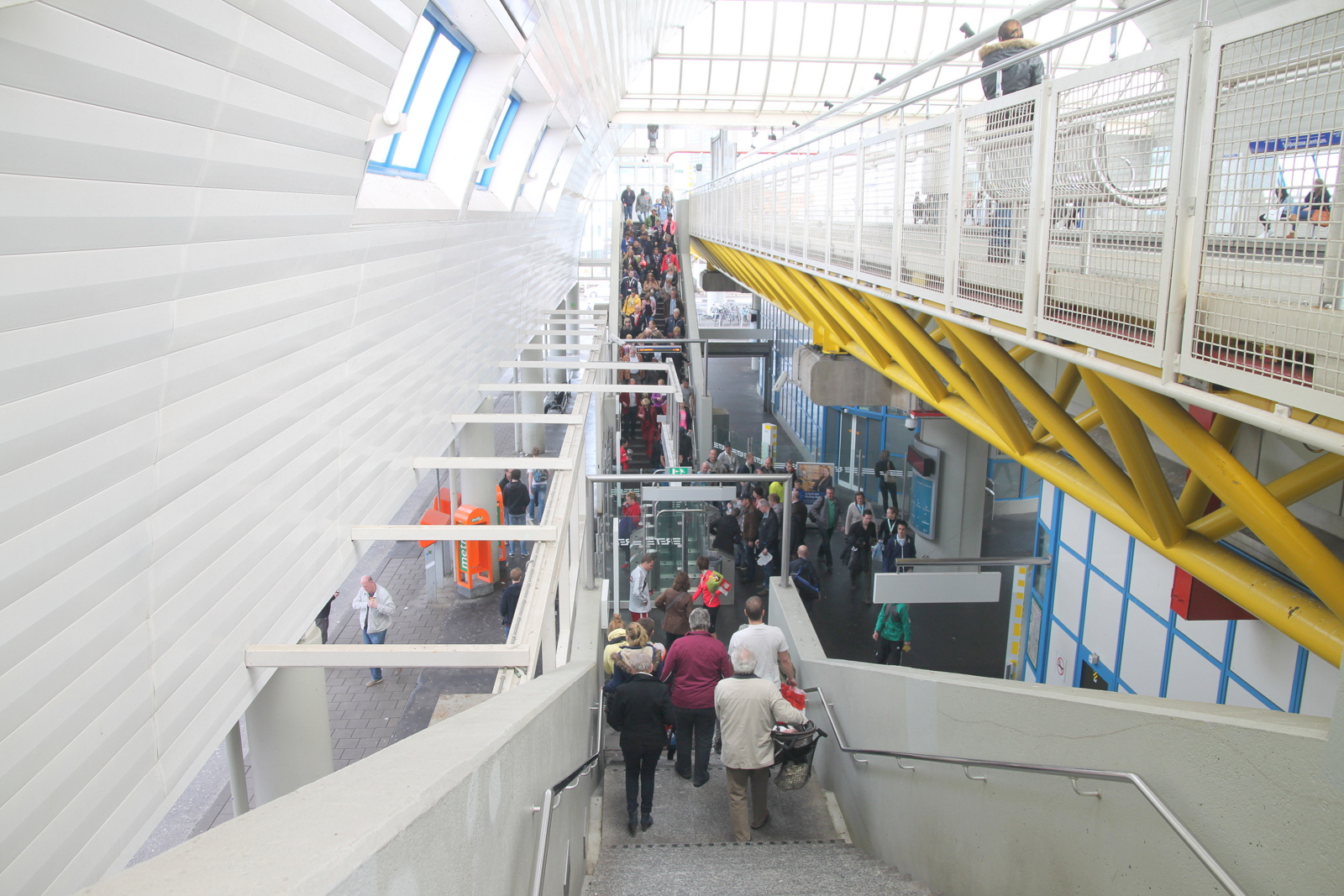

General information
- Location: Spijkenisse, Netherlands
- Coordinates: 51°50′47″N 4°20′4″E
- System: Rotterdam Metro station
- Owner: RET
- Platforms: Side platforms
- Tracks: 2

Construction
- Structure type: Elevated

History
- Opened: 25 April 1985

Services
Preceding station	Rotterdam Metro	Following station
Heemraadlaan towards De Akkers	Line C	Zalmplaat towards De Terp
Heemraadlaan towards De Akkers	Line D	Zalmplaat towards Rotterdam Centraal
Location

Spijkenisse Centrum is one of three above-ground subway stations in the Dutch city of Spijkenisse. The station is served by trains of Rotterdam Metro lines C and D and has two side platforms. Located just outside the station is a hospital, as well as a bus station allowing interchange with local and regional buses. In 1986 the station received the National Steel Award in category A: Buildings with a steel support structure.

The station was opened on 25 April 1985. On that date, the North-South Line (currently operated by line D trains) was extended from its former terminus, Zalmplaat station, towards its current terminus, De Akkers station. Since the East-West Line was connected to the North-South Line in November 2002, trains of what is currently line C also call at the station.
