= Patrick Soultana =

Dutch murderer

- Born: 1 January 1977 (age 49); Amsterdam, Netherlands
- Conviction: Murder
- Penalty: Life imprisonment plus 25 years

Details
- Victims: 2–5
- Span of crimes: 2010–2011
- Country: Netherlands
- Date apprehended: 12 October 2011

Patrick Soultana (born 1 January 1977) is a convicted Dutch murderer. He was sentenced to life imprisonment on 25 July 2013 for two murders and one attempted murder. In December 2014, he was resentenced to 25 years plus provision after an appeal.

== Victims ==
=== Farida Zargar ===
Farida Nadjiebullovna Zargar (born in 1988 in Kemerovo, Russia) was stabbed several times and then strangled by Soultana on 5 August 2010. Soultana declared to a witness that he intended to rob Zargar, but that he killed her because she started screaming. On 9 November 2010 Soultana threw the bank card and e.dentifier of Zargar in a letterbox of a police station in Spijkenisse. Footage of Soultana was captured by police station security cameras and his image was later broadcast in Opsporing Verzocht, but Soultana was not recognized. On 26 November 2010 Zargar's bicycle was found in Mallebos and on 8 March 2011 her key ring was also found. After Soultana's arrest, several items belonging to Zargar were found in his bedroom, including her passport, watch and bracelet, with traces of blood on some of the items. After Soultana killed Zargar, he sawed off her foot and buried it in a pot under his shed, burying her body in Mallebos afterwards. On 11 November 2011, Zargar's body was finally located when Soultana agreed to take police to the location where he had buried her.

=== Nanda Kerklaan ===
Nanda Kerklaan (born 1966) was found in a ditch at the Malledijk in Spijkenisse on the morning of 28 January 2010. She was badly injured and was barely conscious due to a head wound and severe hypothermia. She was resuscitated on the spot and transported to the hospital. After being examined, she appeared to have multiple cranial fractures, four broken ribs and a collapsed lung. According to a forensics doctor, it was due to considerable external violence. On 2 February 2010 Kerklaan died of her injuries, without being able to tell what had happened to her. The police stated to the media that the possible cause was an accident. Soultana, however, confessed to an informant that before the murder of Zargar, he had killed Kerklaan after he attempted to rob her.

=== Polish man ===
On 24 March 2011 Soultana, along with a friend, 21-year-old Timothy S., robbed a Polish man from Włocławek. In doing so, both men hit the man on the head several times with an iron bar, took his belongings and left him for dead. The man, however, survived the attack. Both perpetrators were convicted of attempted murder. Timothy S. was also a co-suspect in Kerklaan's murder but was acquitted.

== Suspected victims ==
=== Joke Lorsé ===
In 2014 suspicion arose that Soultana might have also killed 50-year-old Joke Lorsé on 11 August 2009. In Simonshaven, the woman was beaten to death with a blunt weapon while walking with her husband. Her husband explained that an unknown man jumped out of the bushes and knocked him unconscious. After he recovered, his wife lay dead beside him. However, the statement was dismissed by the police. The husband Ernst L. was sentenced to 12 years in prison but appealed to 9 years.

=== Two unknowns ===
Soultana allegedly stated to a police informant that he had killed five women. Besides Zargar, Kerklaan and possibly Lorsé, two more women could also be victims of Soultana according to the police.

== Arrest and conviction ==
Soultana was arrested on 12 October 2011 after a street robbery. Because money was stolen from his victim, authorities were entitled to search Soultana's house. In the bedroom, officers found 447 items of suspected victims, including several blood-stained items from Farida Zargar. As a result, Soultana came into the picture as a suspect in Zargar's murder. During his stay in a penitentiary in The Hague, Soultana told a police informant that he killed five women. Police had evidence to connect Soultana to the murders of Zargar and Kerklaan, but could not connect him to any further murders. Soultana was sentenced to life imprisonment on 25 July 2013 for the killings of Zargar and Kerklaan, and the attempted murder of the Polish man. Furthermore, he was also convicted for the possession of child pornography and the commission of a large number of robberies. In December 2014, he was given a new sentence of 25 years after an appeal.

On 19 February 2014, Soultana confessed to The Hague Court of Appeal his involvement in the murder of Zargar, to the surprise of the Advocate General. He stated that he had been there, but that he did not use violence himself.

== See also ==
- List of serial killers by country

== Notes ==
Police resumes investigation into Patrick Soultana on Nieuwsopbeeld.nl consulted on 15 June 2020
Prison sentence for 'henchman' of Patrick Soultana on Trouw.nl, consulted on 14 January 2014
Patrick Soultana sentenced to life on Crimesite.nl, consulted on 14 January 2014
