= Spijkenisse =

- Town
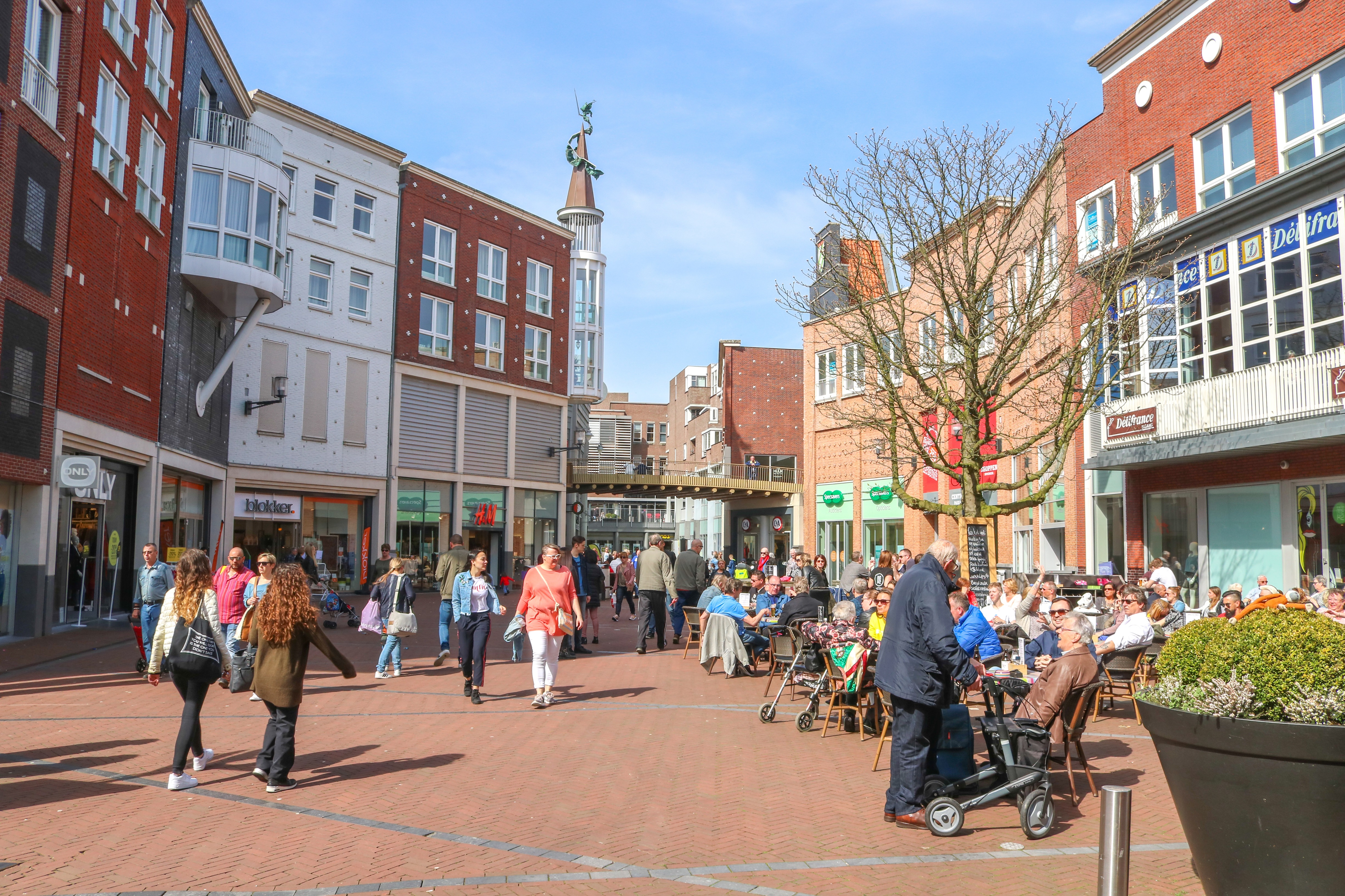
- Town centre of Spijkenisse

- Flag Coat of arms

- Location in South Holland
- Coordinates: 51°51′N 4°20′E
- Country: Netherlands
- Province: South Holland
- Municipality: Nissewaard

Area
  - Total: 30.27 km^{2} (11.69 sq mi)
  - Land: 26.12 km^{2} (10.08 sq mi)
  - Water: 4.15 km^{2} (1.60 sq mi)
- Elevation: −1 m (−3.3 ft)

Population
  - Total: 72,500
- Demonym: Spijkenissenaar
- Time zone: UTC+1 (CET)
  - Summer (DST): UTC+2 (CEST)
- Postcode: 3200–3209
- Area code: 0181
- Website: www.nissewaard.nl

Spijkenisse (Dutch pronunciation: [spɛikəˈnɪsə]) is a large town in the province of South Holland, Netherlands. Following an administrative reform in 2015 which merged the municipialities of Bernisse and Spijkenisse, it is part of the municipality of Nissewaard, and has a population of 72,500. It covers an area of 30.27 km^{2} (11.69 sq mi) of which 4.15 km^{2} (1.60 sq mi) is water. It is part of the Greater Rotterdam area.

== History ==
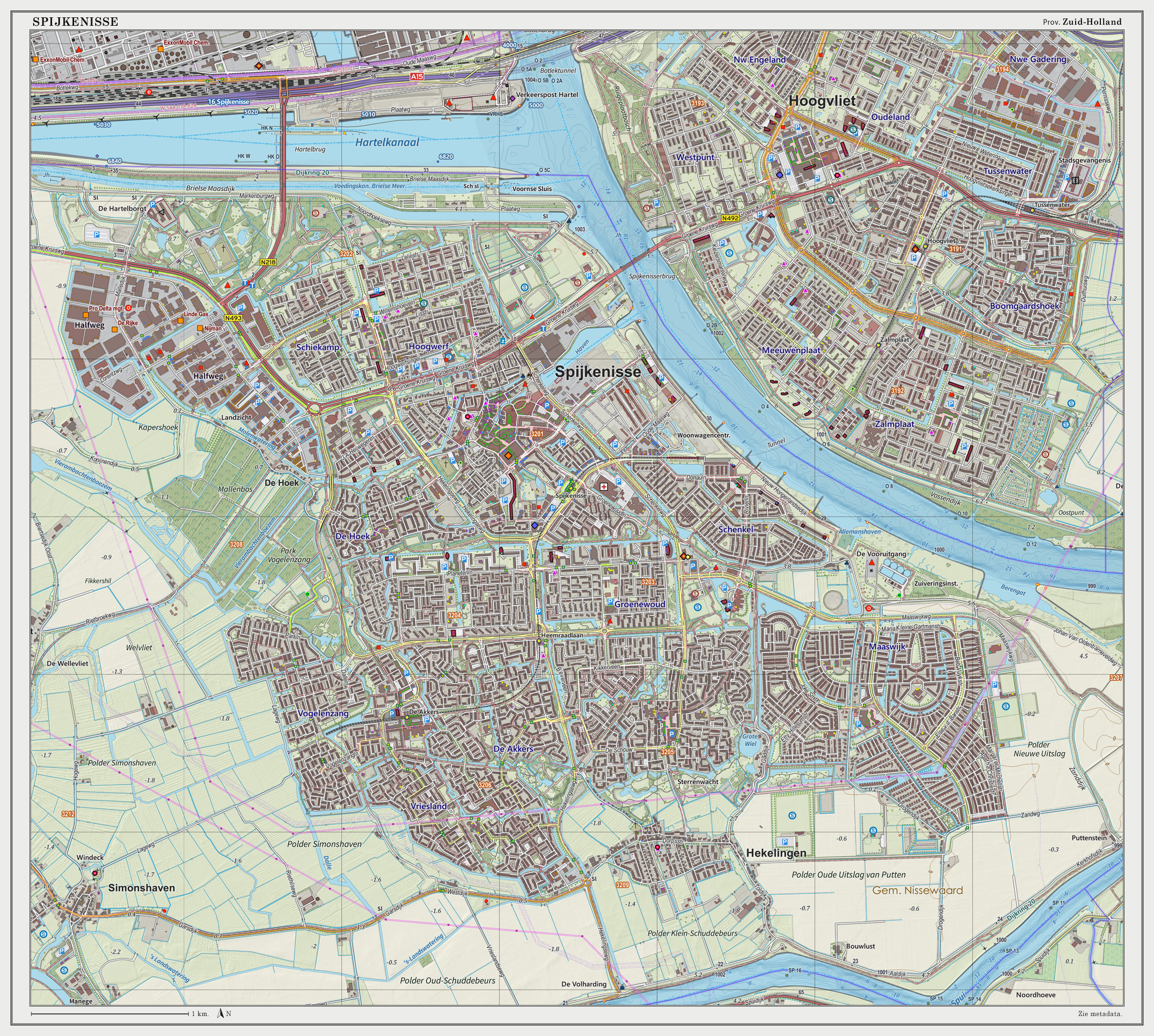
Topographic map of Spijkenisse, as 2014

Archaeological evidence suggests that the area around Spijkenisse has been inhabited for several thousand years. The area's prehistoric inhabitants depended on fishing in the Maas and hunting in the surrounding swamps for sustenance.

The oldest known reference to the name Spickenisse is in a source from 1231. Spijkenisse is a portmanteau of the words spieke (spit) and nesse (nose) meaning "pointy nose." The name is a reference to the settlement's location on a spit of land protruding into the river.

Spijkenisse formed as a farming and fishing village on a creek along the Oude Maas. It originally belonged to the Lord of Putten (whose coat of arms is now used by the town) but in 1459 the fiefdom of Putten, including Spijkenisse, was transferred to Philip III, Duke of Burgundy. In 1581, after the Dutch declaration of independence, the area came under the control of the States of Holland and West Friesland.

In the 16th century, the village suffered several floods, and endured destructive fires in the following two centuries which hampered its economic growth. In the 20th century Spijkenisse heavily urbanised as part of the Greater Rotterdam area. Contemporary Spijkenisse includes the communities of Hekelingen, Den Hoek, and Beerenplaat.

== Transport ==
Spijkenisse has a connection to the city of Rotterdam by Rotterdam Metro lines C and D, through Spijkenisse Centrum, Heemraadlaan and De Akkers stations. The metro is operated by RET.

On 2 November 2020, at about 00:30, a train ran through buffers at the end of the line and was saved from plunging 10 metres by the "Whale tails" sculpture.

There are also several bus services operated by EBS and 1 line of Connexxion to Ouddorp.

There are two bridges which connect the town to the city of Rotterdam, Hartelburg and Spijkenisserbrug.

In 2011, the town built seven bridges designed by Robin Stam, replicating Robert Kalina's fictional designs on the euro banknotes.

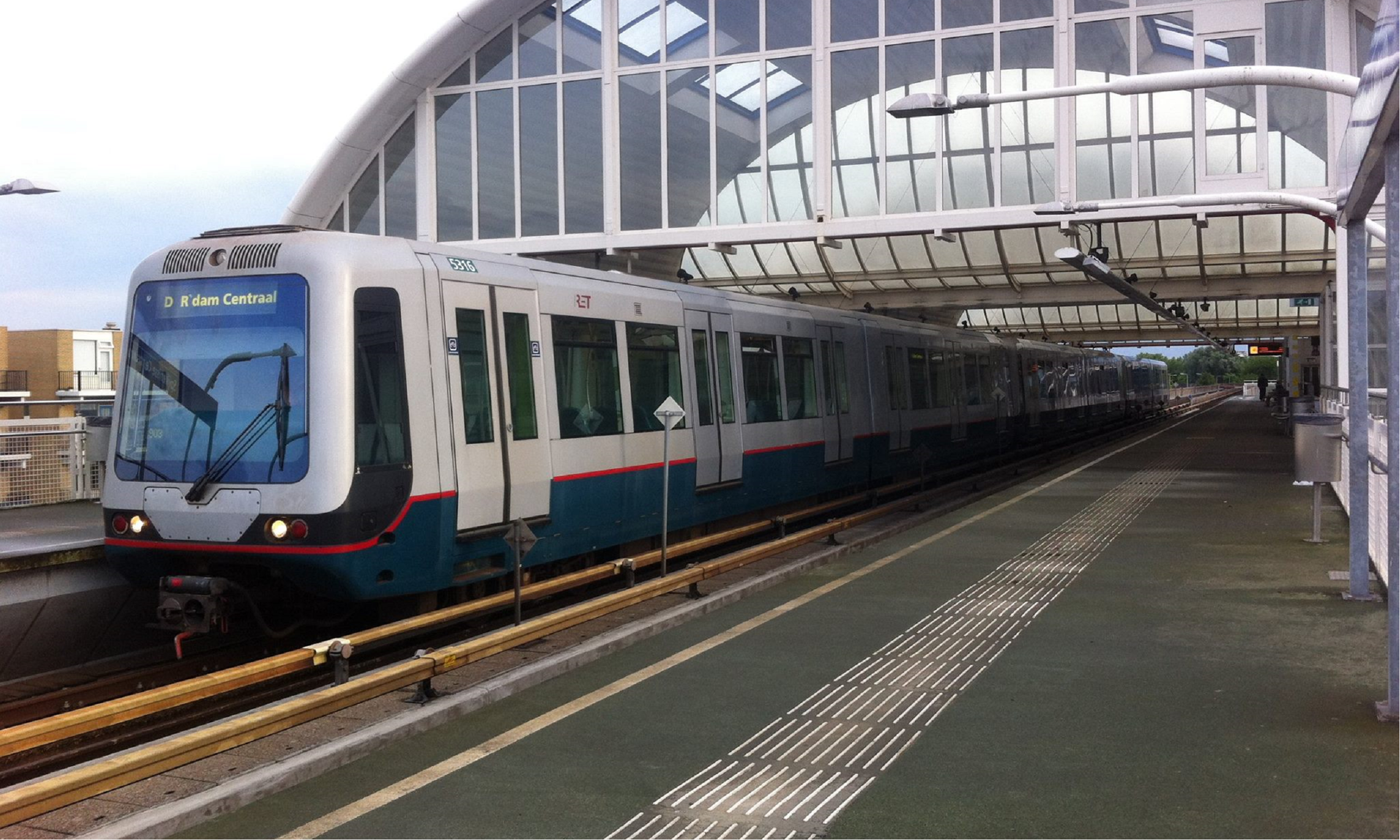
Spijkenisse Centrum

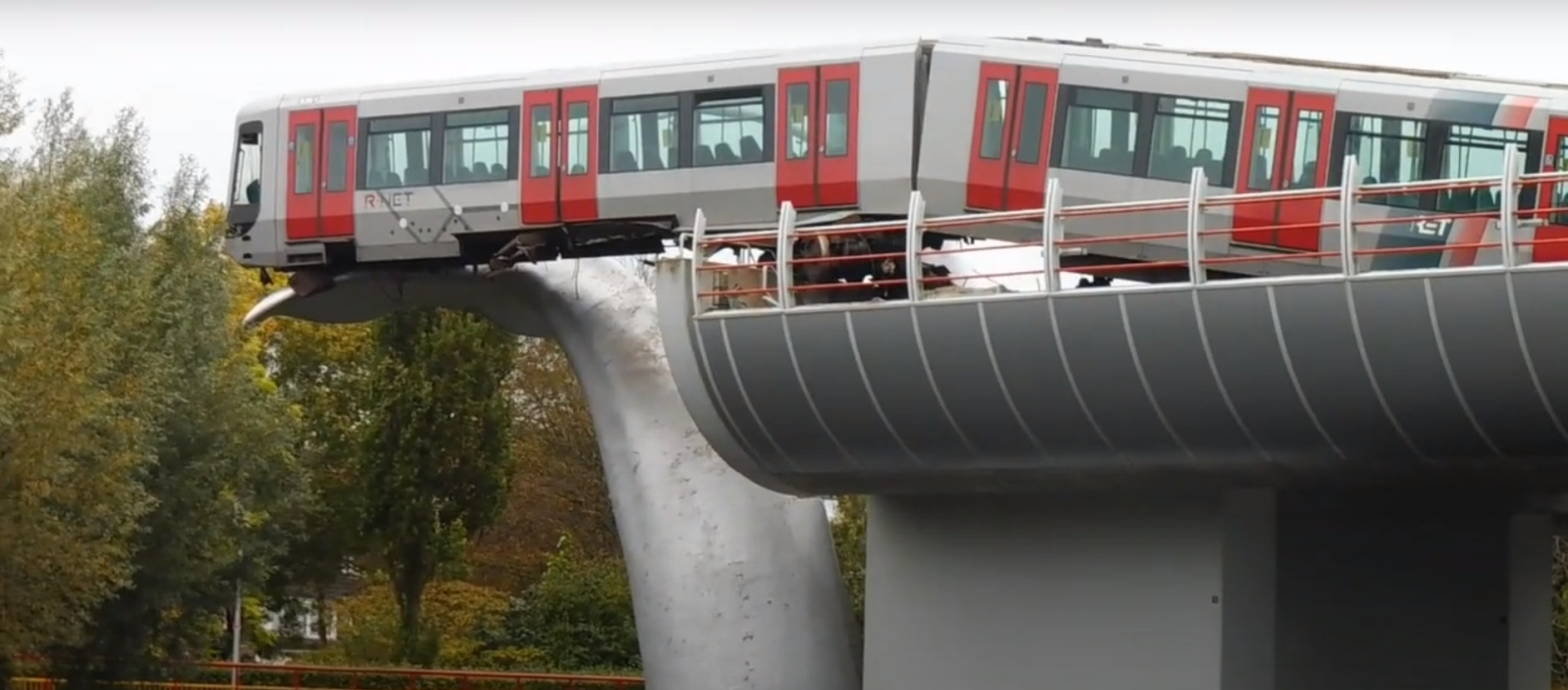
Accident on November 2, 2020

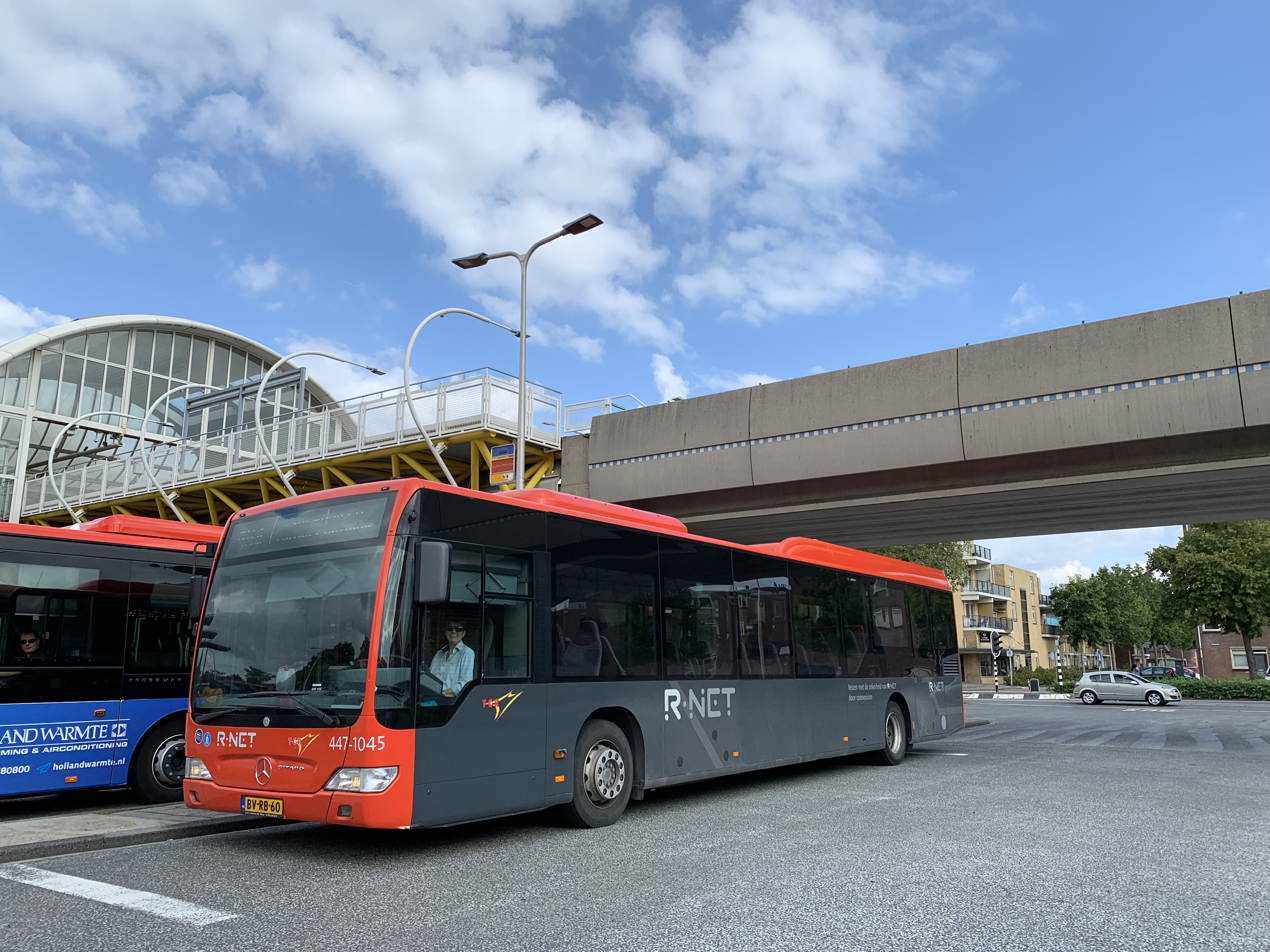
Bus service

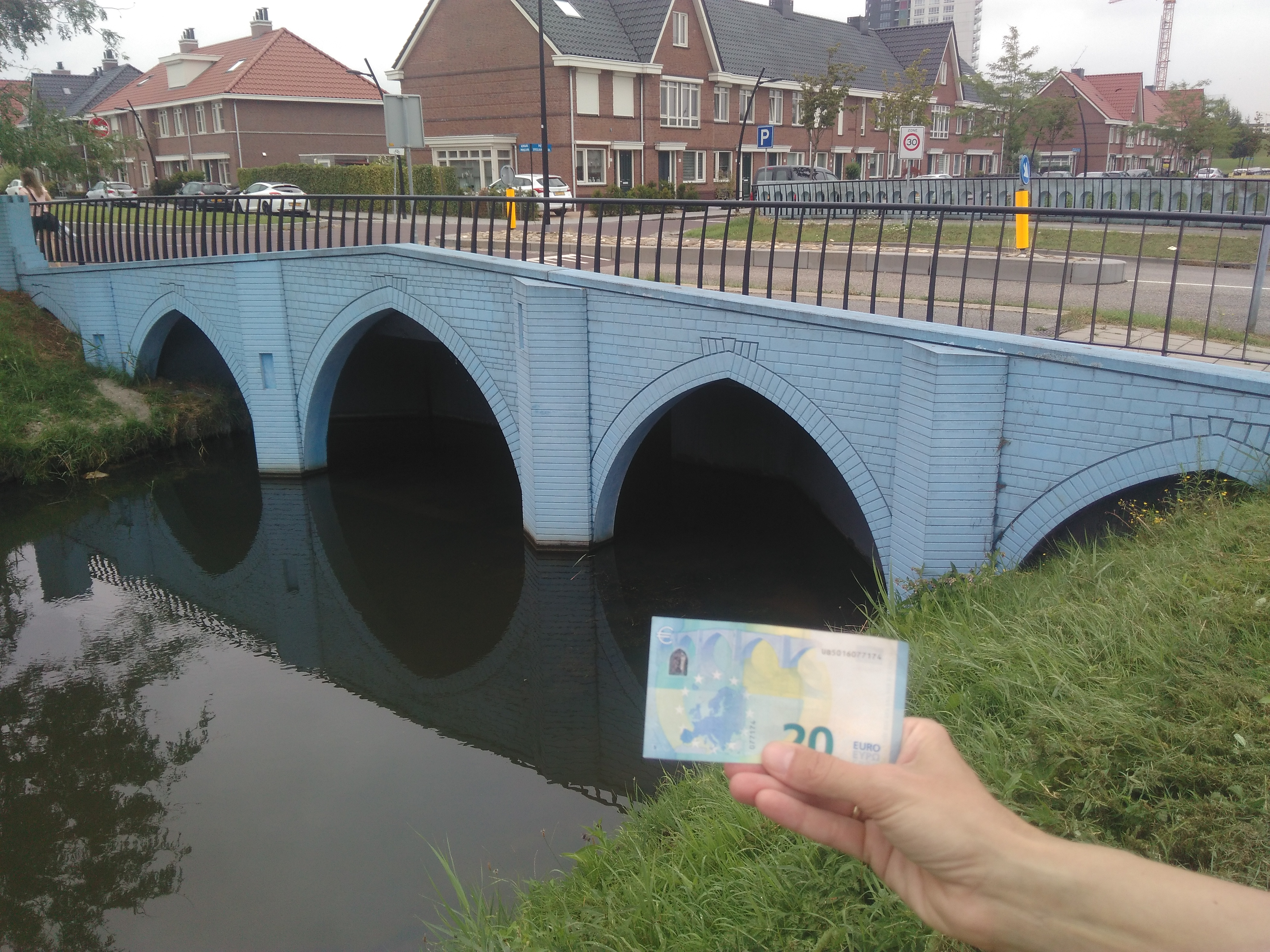
Eurobridge 20 euro

== Districts ==
- De Akkers
- Centrum
- De Elementen
- De Hoek
- Gildenwijk
- Groenewoud
- Hoogwerf
- Maaswijk
- Schenkel
- Schiekamp
- Sterrenkwartier
- Vierambachten
- Vogelenzang
- Vriesland
- Waterland

== Health ==
- Spijkenisse Medisch Centrum (former Ruwaard van Putten hospital)

== Schools ==
=== Primary schools ===
Roman Catholic	Protestant	Public	Calvinist
De Akkers	Het Anker	Annie MG Schmidt	De Morgenster
De Klinker	Het Baken	De Vuurvogel	
De Maasoever	De Bron		
Monseigneur Bekkersschool	De Duif	De Vogelenzang	
De Wegwijzer	De Hoeksteen	De Krullevaar	
Paus Johannes	De Marimba	De Meander(tot 2012)	
	De Rank	De Montessori	
	De Schakel	Jan Campert	
		De Piramide	
		De Toermalijn	
		De Veenvlinder	

=== Secondary school ===
Roman Catholic	Christian	Public
MAVO Charles de Foucauld	PENTA college CSG Scala Molenwatering	OSG My College
	PENTA College CSG Scala Rietvelden	OSG De Ring van Putten
	PENTA college CSG De Oude Maas	

== Notable residents ==
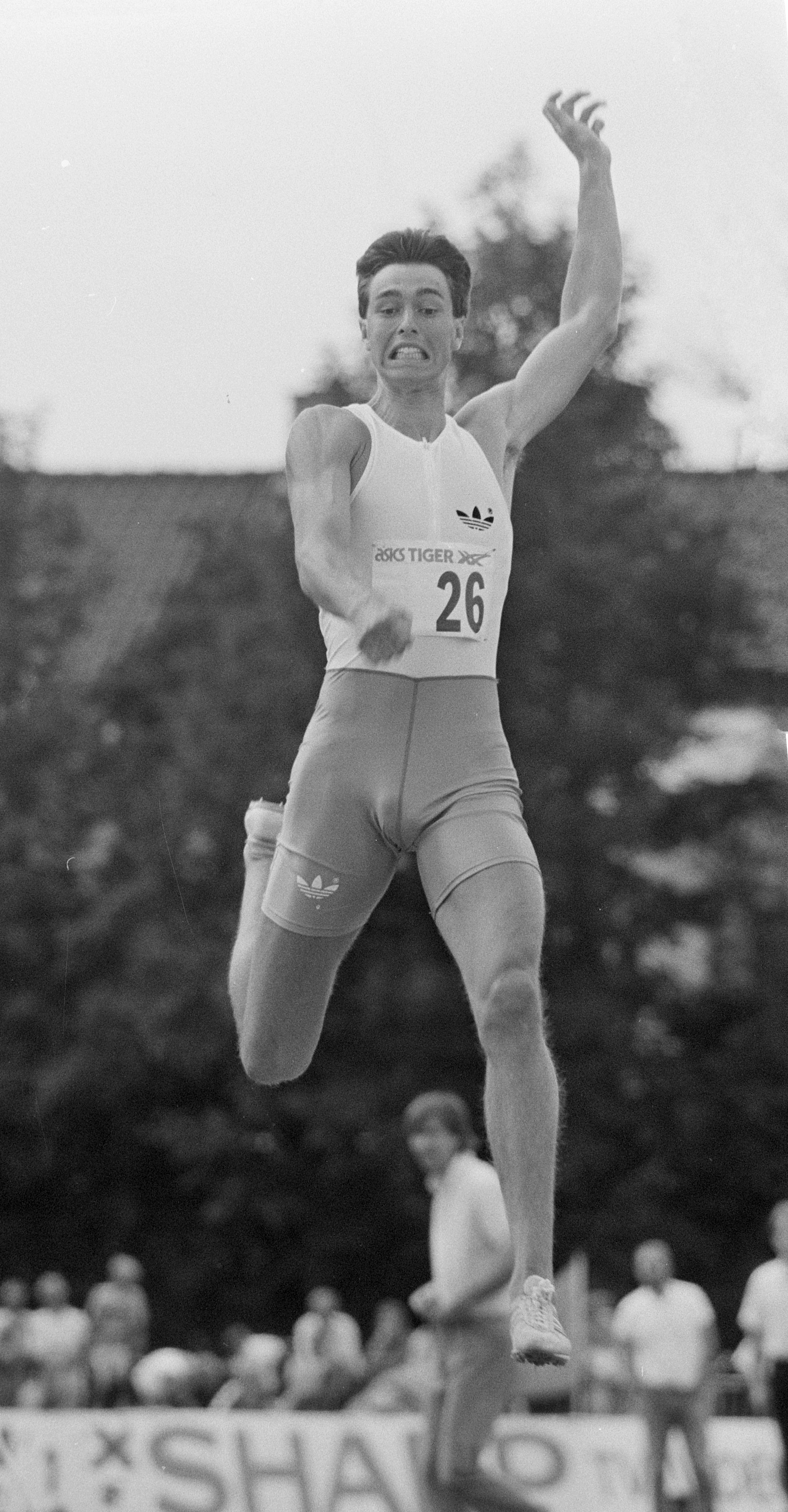
Emiel Mellaard, 1987

- Jan Campert (1902 in Spijkenisse – 1943) a journalist, theater critic and writer
- Marleen de Pater-van der Meer (1950 in Hekelingen – 2015) a Dutch politician
- Jan Bechtum (born 1958 in Spijkenisse) a Dutch guitarist
- Erik de Jong (born 1961 in Spijkenisse) known as Spinvis, a Dutch one-man music project
- Rolf Habben Jansen (born in 1966 in Spijkenisse), current CEO of Hapag-Lloyd AG
- Medy van der Laan (born 1968 in Spijkenisse) a retired Dutch politician
- Björn Franken (born 1983 in Spijkenisse) known as Vato Gonzalez, DJ and producer
- Nick van de Wall (born 1987 in Spijkenisse) known as Afrojack, DJ and producer
- Duncan Laurence (born 1994 in Spijkenisse) singer, winner of the Eurovision Song Contest 2019
- Fabiënne Nicole Groeneveld (born 1999 in Spijkenisse) businesswoman, model, winner of Miss Universe Indonesia 2023

Sport

- Bram Groeneweg (1905 in Spijkenisse – 1988) a Dutch long-distance runner, competed in the marathon at the 1928 Summer Olympics
- Emiel Mellaard (born 1966 in Spijkenisse) is a retired Dutch long jump record holder
- Joeri de Groot (born 1977 in Spijkenisse) a Dutch rower, competed at the 2004 Summer Olympics
- Patrick van Luijk (born 1984 in Spijkenisse) a Dutch sprinter
- Martijn Barto (born 1984 in Spijkenisse) a Dutch professional footballer with over 200 club caps
- Djenairo Daniels

== International relations ==
Spijkenisse is twinned with the following cities:

Hürth (Germany) since 1966	Thetford (United Kingdom) since 1962

== Gallery ==
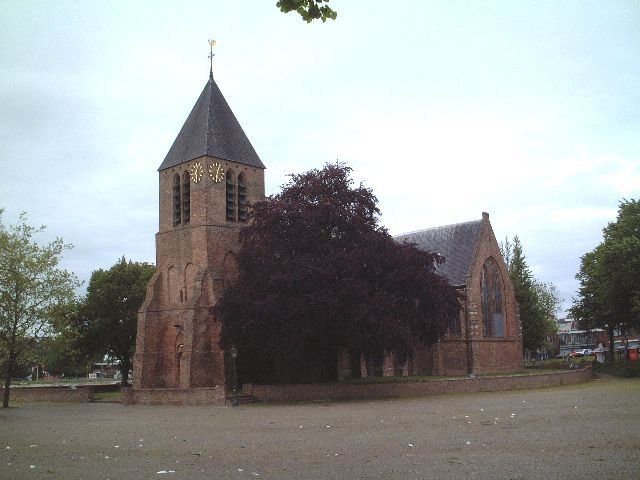
The medieval village church is the oldest building in Spijkenisse.

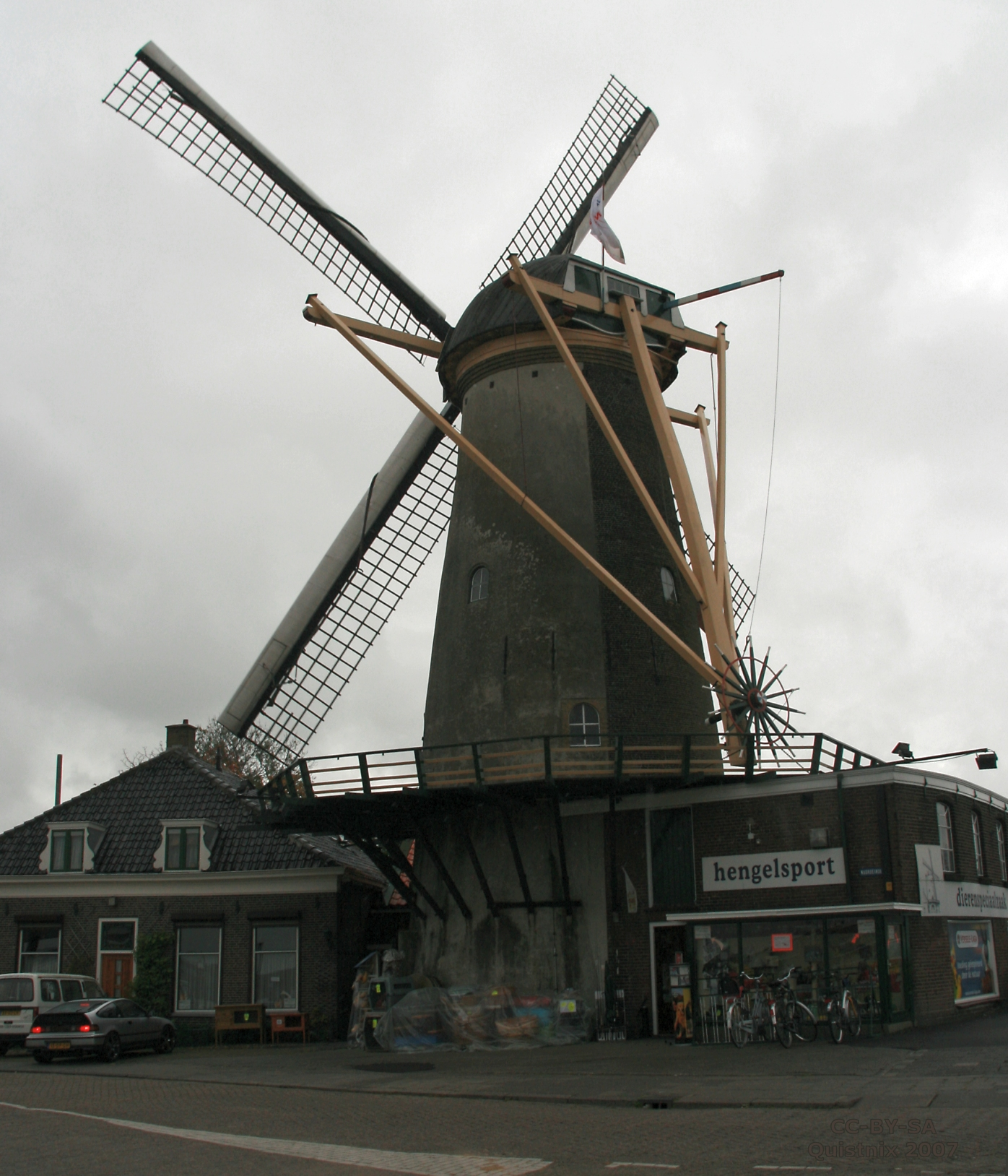
Windmill "Nooitgedacht" in Spijkenisse.

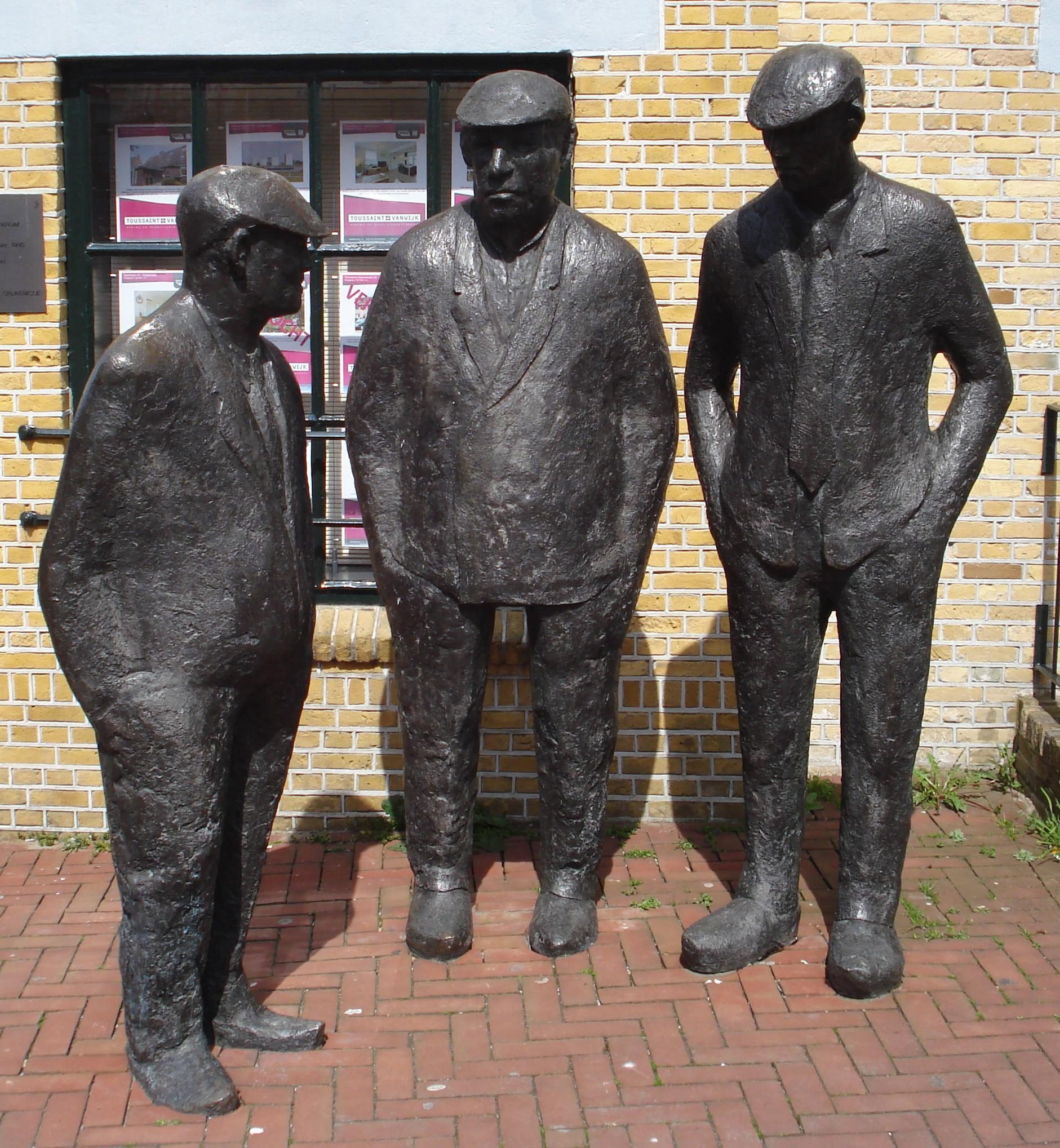
Mannetjes op de krom by Bert Kiewiet

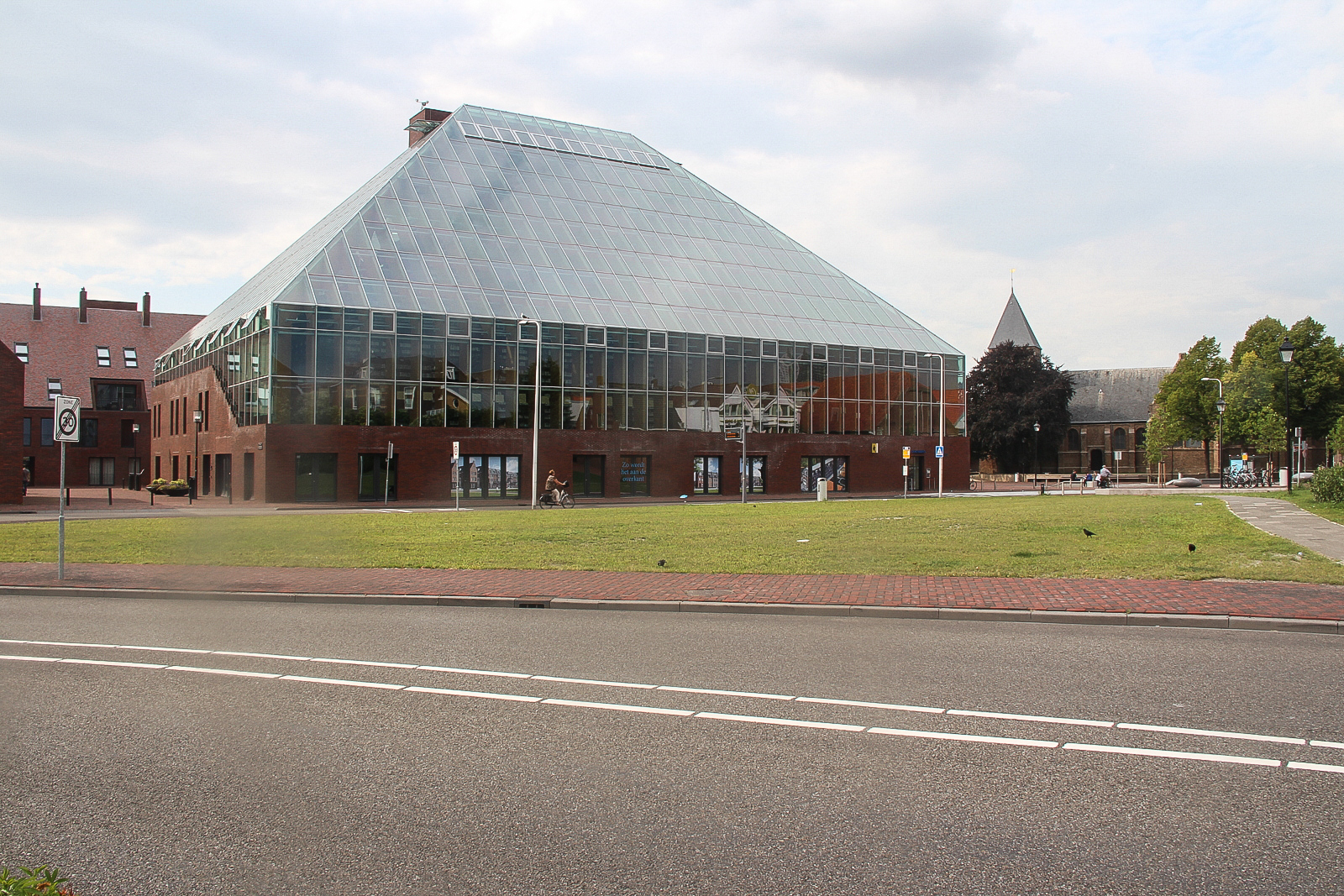
The library "Bookmountain"

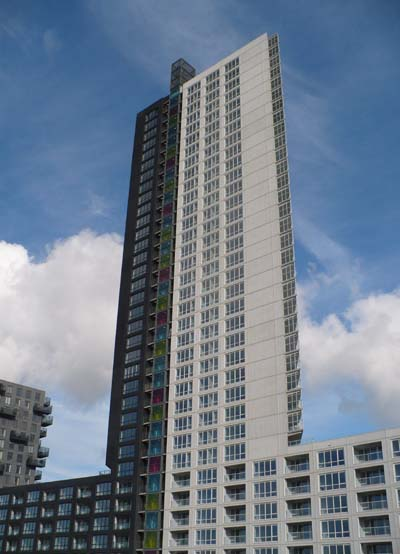
The Rokade

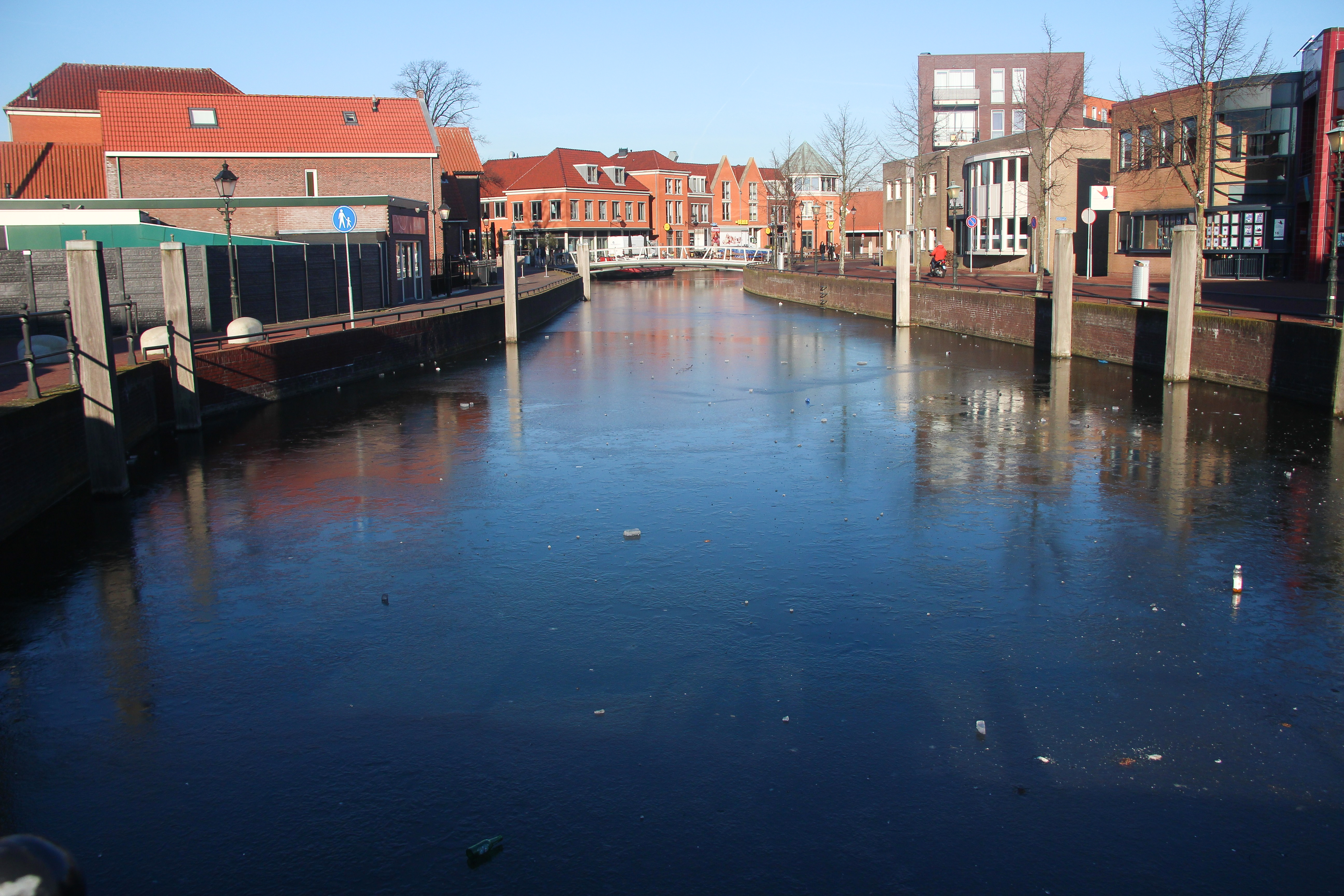
Ice in the harbour of Spijkenisse

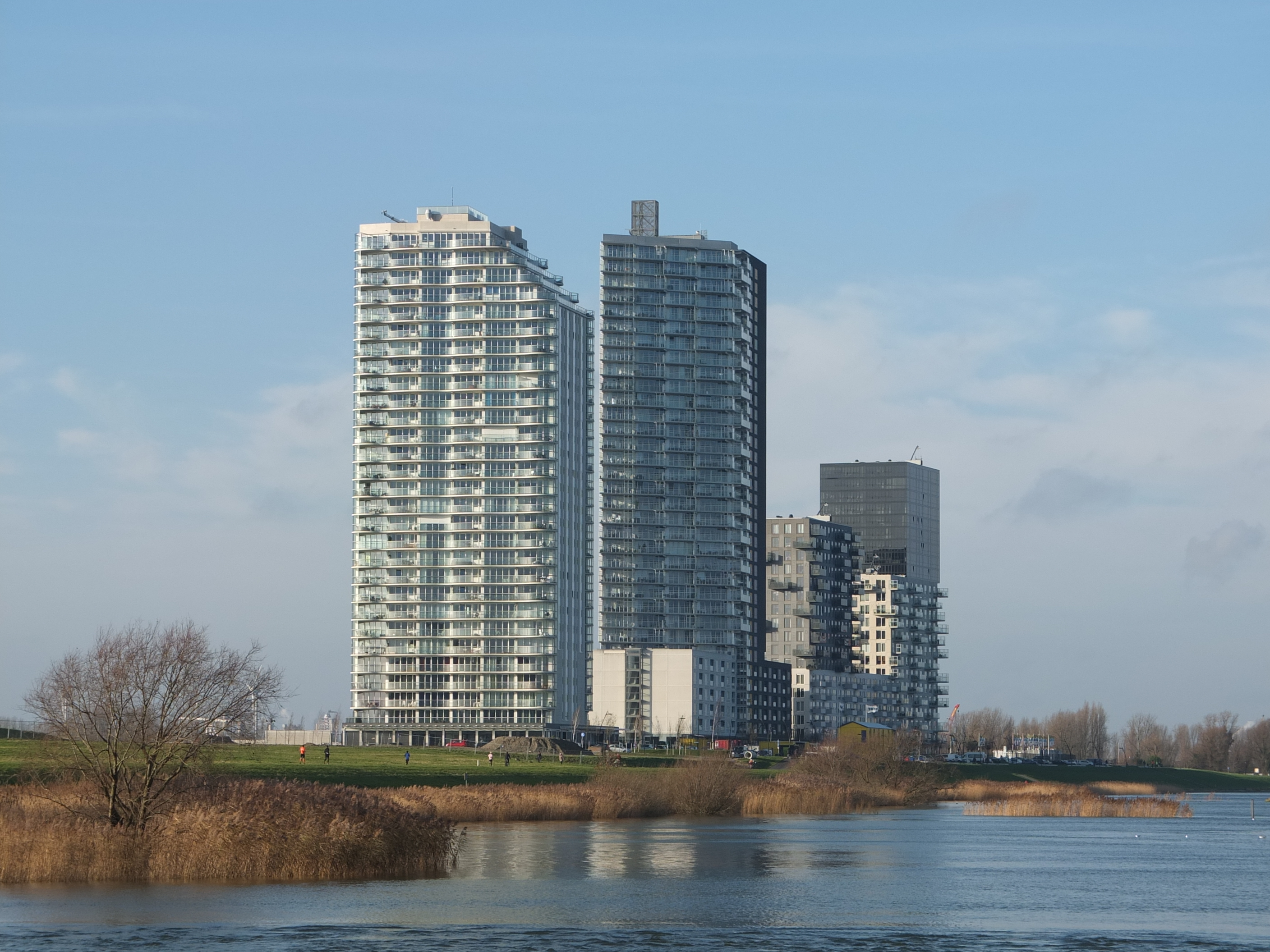
The Maasboulevard

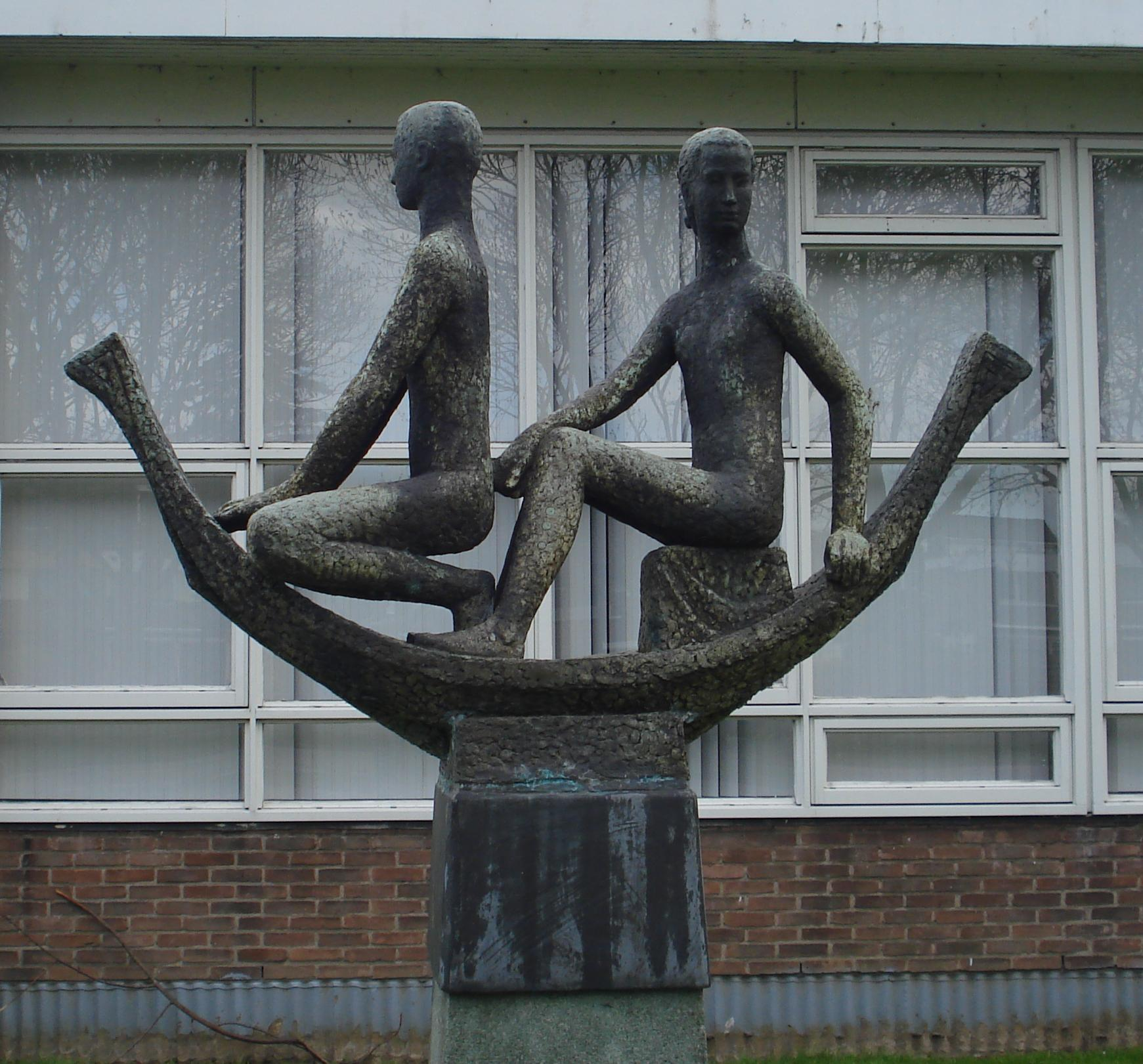
Sculpture "droomboot" (dream boat)

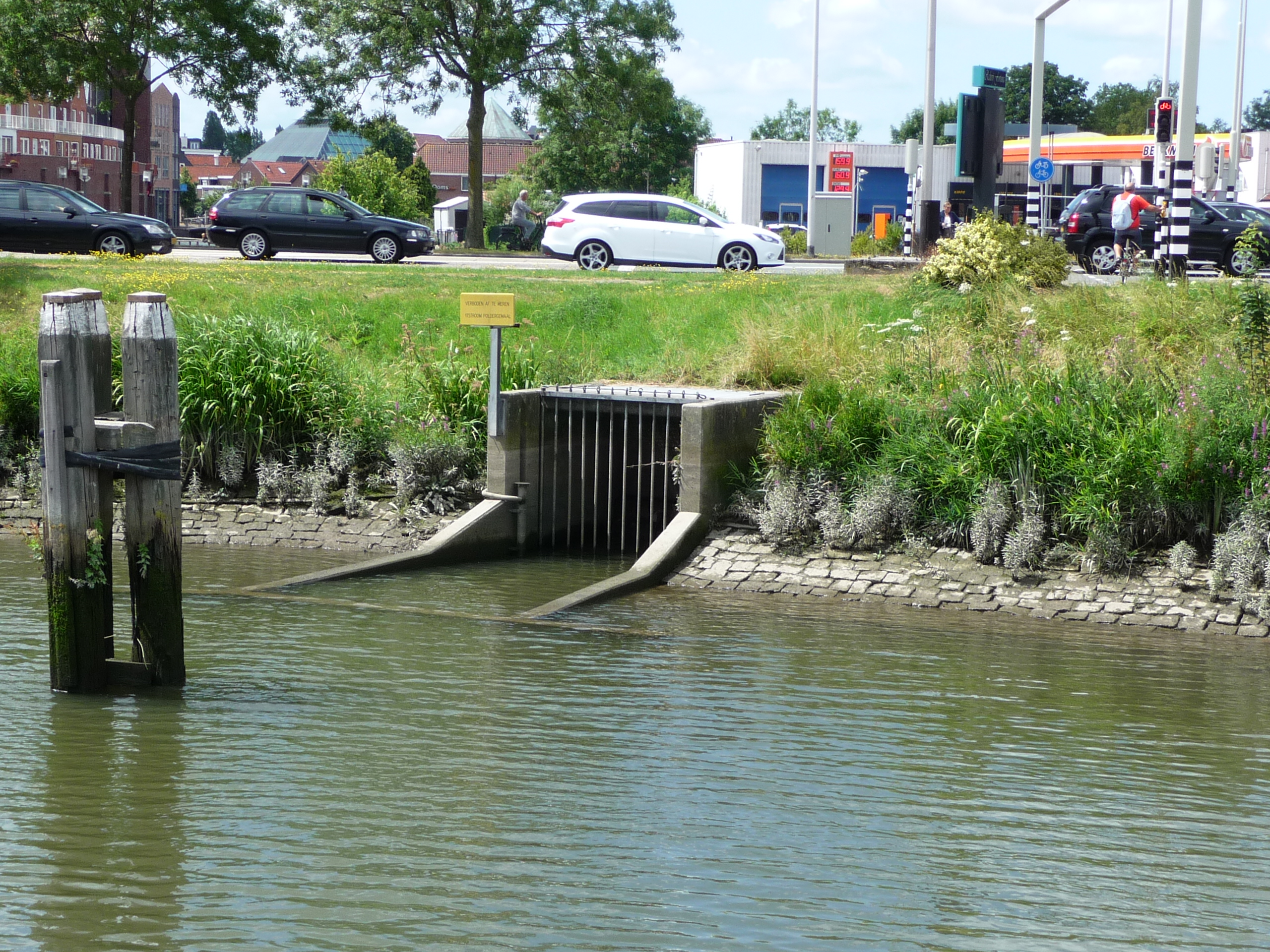
Outfall sluice
