= Rotterdam Metro =

Rapid transit system in Rotterdam, Netherlands

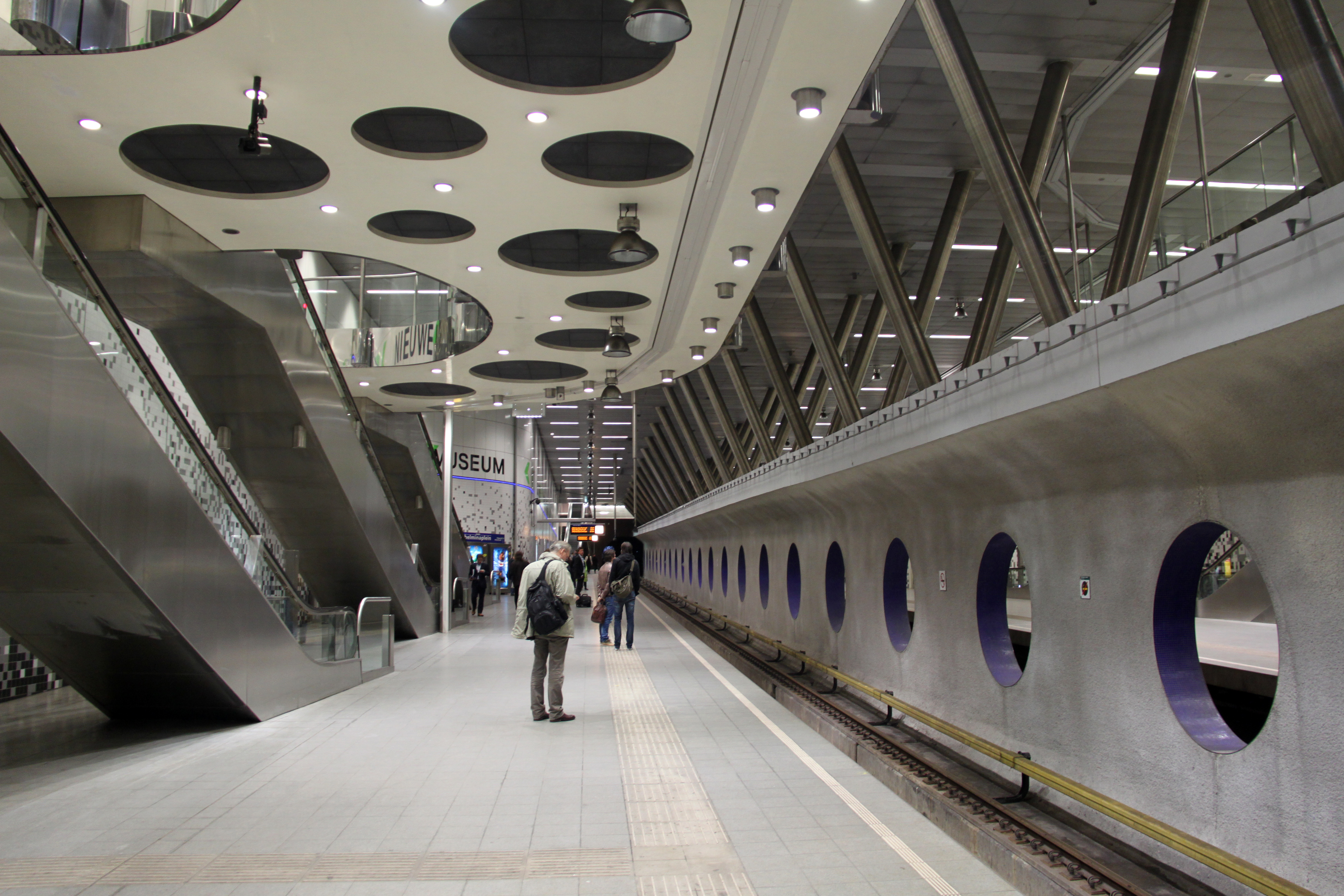
- Wilhelminaplein metro station, Lines D and E

Overview
- Native name: Rotterdamse metro
- Locale: Rotterdam, Netherlands
- Transit type: Rapid transit and light rail
- Number of lines: 5
- Number of stations: 71
- Annual ridership: 100.7 million (2024)
- Website: RET (in English)

Operation
- Began operation: 9 February 1968; 58 years ago
- Operator: Rotterdamse Elektrische Tram (RET)
- Number of vehicles: 167

Technical
- System length: 103.1 km (64.1 mi)
- Track gauge: 1,435 mm (4 ft 8 1/2 in) standard gauge
- Electrification: Third rail/overhead line, 750 V DC
- Top speed: 100 km/h (62 mph)
System map

The Rotterdam Metro (Dutch: Rotterdamse Metro) is a rapid transit system operated in Rotterdam, Netherlands and surrounding municipalities by RET. The first line, called Noord – Zuidlijn (lit. 'North – South line') opened in 1968 and ran from Centraal Station to Zuidplein, crossing the river Nieuwe Maas in a tunnel. It was the first metro system to open in the Netherlands. At the time it was also one of the shortest metro lines in the world with a length of only 5.9 km (3.7 mi).

In 1982 a second line was opened, the Oost – Westlijn (lit. 'East – West line'), running between Capelsebrug and Coolhaven stations. In the late 1990s, the lines were named after two historic Rotterdam citizens, the Erasmus Line (North – South) after Desiderius Erasmus and the Caland Line (East – West) after Pieter Caland. As of December 2009, these names were dropped again in favour of a combination of letters and colours, to emphasise and clarify the difference between the separate branches, especially of the former East – West line.

In 2015, there were about 175,000 daily riders of Lines A, B and C. There were 145,000 on Lines D and E.

== Lines ==
=== Lines A and B ===
In the northeast of Rotterdam, Lines A and B branch to Binnenhof (Line A) and to Nesselande (Line B). The latter has been extended since September 2005; before that date, this line terminated at De Tochten.

North of Capelsebrug station and west of Schiedam Centrum station, with the exception of the De Tochten-Nesselande section, Lines A and B have some level crossings (with priority), and could therefore be called light rail instead of metro. These sections also have overhead wires, while most of the system has a third rail (the other exception is Line E (RandstadRail) to The Hague). However, the term light rail is not used in Rotterdam; most people just call these branches metro.

As of 30 September 2019 Line B is connected to the Schiedam–Hoek van Holland railway line, extending the metro network to Hook of Holland (Hoek van Holland), while line A operates on this line as far as Vlaardingen West, starting 1 November 2019.

=== Line C ===
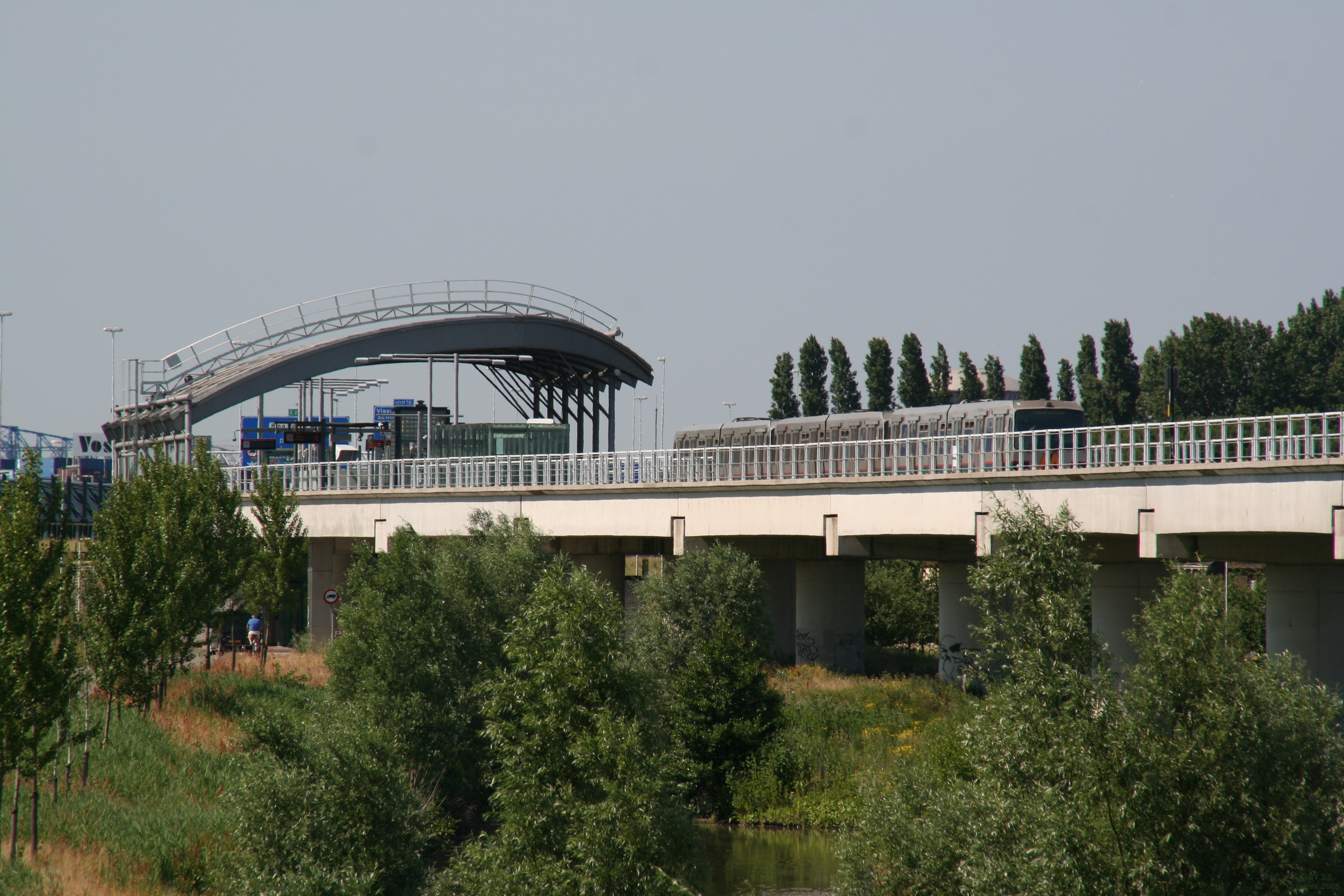
Pernis metro station

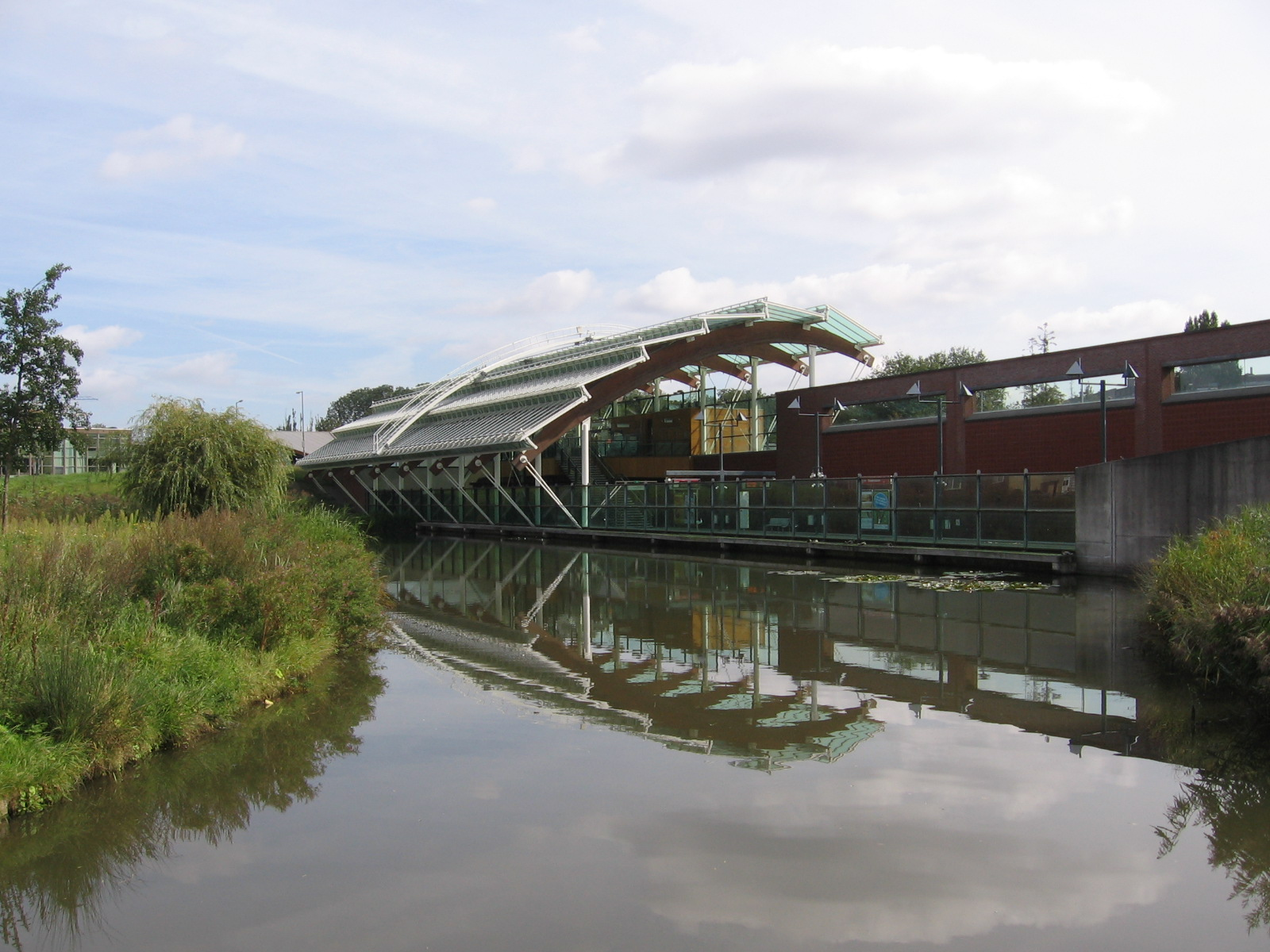
Troelstralaan metro station

At Capelsebrug, Line C branches off the main East-West section to De Terp in Capelle aan den IJssel. Until November 2002, the Calandlijn (now lines A, B and C) terminated in the west of Rotterdam, at Marconiplein. On 4 November 2002 an extension through the city of Schiedam towards Spijkenisse was opened. The extension included four new stations in Schiedam (including Schiedam Centrum station) and one in Pernis. Line C joins Line D at the Tussenwater station in Hoogvliet. Line A and B branch off to the Schiedam-Hoek van Holland railway, while Line C trains continue and, like those on the Line D, terminate at De Akkers station in Spijkenisse.

=== Line D ===
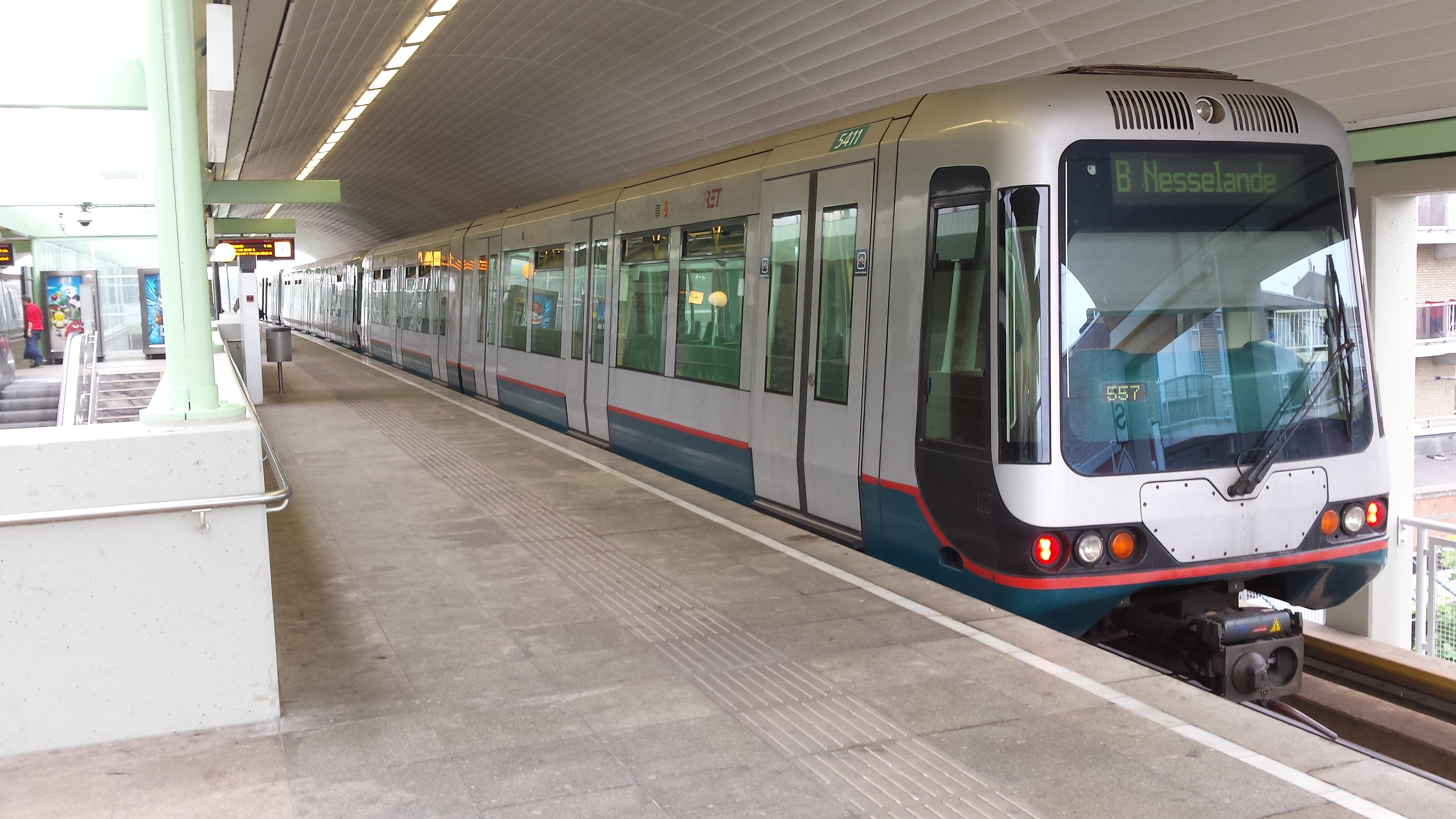
De Akkers metro station

Line D runs from Rotterdam Centraal via Beurs, Slinge, Rhoon, Tussenwater, and Spijkenisse Centrum towards De Akkers.

Line D intersects with Lines A, B and C at Beurs station. Before the connection with Line E at Rotterdam Centraal was realized in December 2011, some Line D trains terminated at Slinge during rush hours.

=== Line E ===
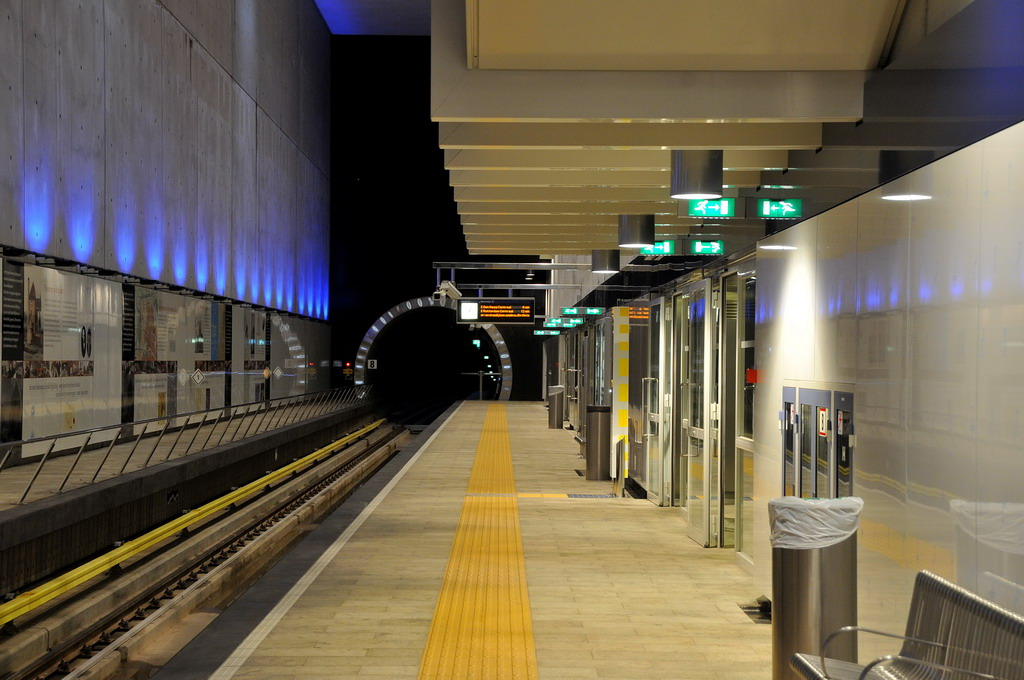
Blijdorp RandstadRail station

Line E is a direct conversion of the former Hofpleinlijn from a railway line to a rapid transit line in 2006. The section of the route between Laan van NOI and Leidschendam-Voorburg is shared with light rail vehicles on two routes from the Hague tram network heading towards Zoetermeer via the Zoetermeer Stadslijn. All of these services fall under the RandstadRail branding.

At the time of opening, the old Hofplein station was temporarily kept as the line's southern terminus. On 17 August 2010, a new tunnel opened, which connected the metro station at Rotterdam Centraal via a new tunnel and new Blijdorp station with the existing tracks near Melanchthonweg station.

For the next year, work was in progress to connect Line D to Line E at Rotterdam Centraal station. Since the completion of this project in December 2011, all trains coming from Den Haag Centraal terminate at Slinge (these are Line E trains), while line D continues in service between De Akkers and Rotterdam Centraal.

The line's northern terminus used the former railway platforms at Den Haag Centraal, which had been inherited from NS and in use since 1975, having been moved from the previous terminus at Den Haag Hollands Spoor. These platforms remained in use until 12 February 2016. The line was then closed between here and Laan Van NOI while construction was completed of a new station built on an elevated viaduct adjacent to the railway platforms. This opened on 22 August 2016.

== Overview ==
Line	Termini (North / East – South / West)	Stations	Length km (mi)	Notes
A	Binnenhof – Vlaardingen West	24	17.2 (10.7) (Note: Length to Schiedam Centum)	Terminates at Schiedam Centrum outside peak hours.
B	Nesselande – Hoek van Holland Strand	32	42.4 (26.3)	Alternate trains terminate at Steendijkpolder.
C	De Terp – De Akkers	26	30 (18.6)	
D	Pijnacker Zuid – De Akkers	23	21 (13) (Note: Length to Rotterdam Central Station)	Terminates at Rotterdam Central Station outside peak hours.
E	Den Haag Centraal – Slinge	23	27 (16.8)	Part of RandstadRail.

=== Future extensions ===
RET plans to build a connecting line from Kralingse Zoom station to the new Feijenoord City housing area, and then on to Zuidplein, Charlois and Rotterdam Central station; along with plans to convert two tracks of four heavy-rail tracks between Rotterdam Central and Dordrecht to metro operation. By adding extra stations and operating trains at two-minute interval RET expects to achieve a significant increase in traffic. Another ambition is to automate the metro to achieve 90-second headways.

== Rolling stock ==
Series	Built	Vehicle numbers	Manufacturer	Status	Power supply	Vehicle length	Cabs	Image
MG2	1966‍–‍1967	5001‍–‍5027	Werkspoor	Retired	Third rail	29 m (95 ft)	2	
MG2	1970	5051–5066	Werkspoor	Retired	Third rail	29 m (95 ft)	2	
MG2	1974–1975	5101–5126; 5151–5152	Duewag	Retired	Third rail	29 m (95 ft)	2	
SG2	1980–1984	5201–5271	Duewag	Retired	Third rail Overhead wire	29.8 m (98 ft)	2	
MG2/1	1998–2001	5301–5363	Bombardier	In service	Third rail	30.5 m (100 ft)	1	
SG2/1	2001–2002	5401–5418	Bombardier	In service	Third rail Overhead wire	30.5 m (100 ft)	1	
RSG3	2007–2009	5501–5522	Bombardier	In service	Third rail Overhead wire	42 m (138 ft)	2	
SG3	2009–2011	5601–5642	Bombardier	In service	Third rail Overhead wire	42 m (138 ft)	2	
HSG3	2015–2017	5701–5722	Bombardier	In service	Third rail Overhead wire	42 m (138 ft)	2	

Trains series 5300, 5400, 5500, 5600 and 5700 are Bombardier Flexity Swifts. The series 5500 trains, made between 2007 and 2009, were built for the new RandstadRail Line E. The 5601-5642 trains were built to replace older Duewag stock (series 5200). In 2013, RET announced that it ordered 16 additional vehicles of SG3 stock to run on the Hoekse Line extension. A further six vehicles were ordered to increase capacity on the Randstadrail branch in 2015. Delivery of these 22 vehicles, called HSG3, took place between 2015 and 2017.

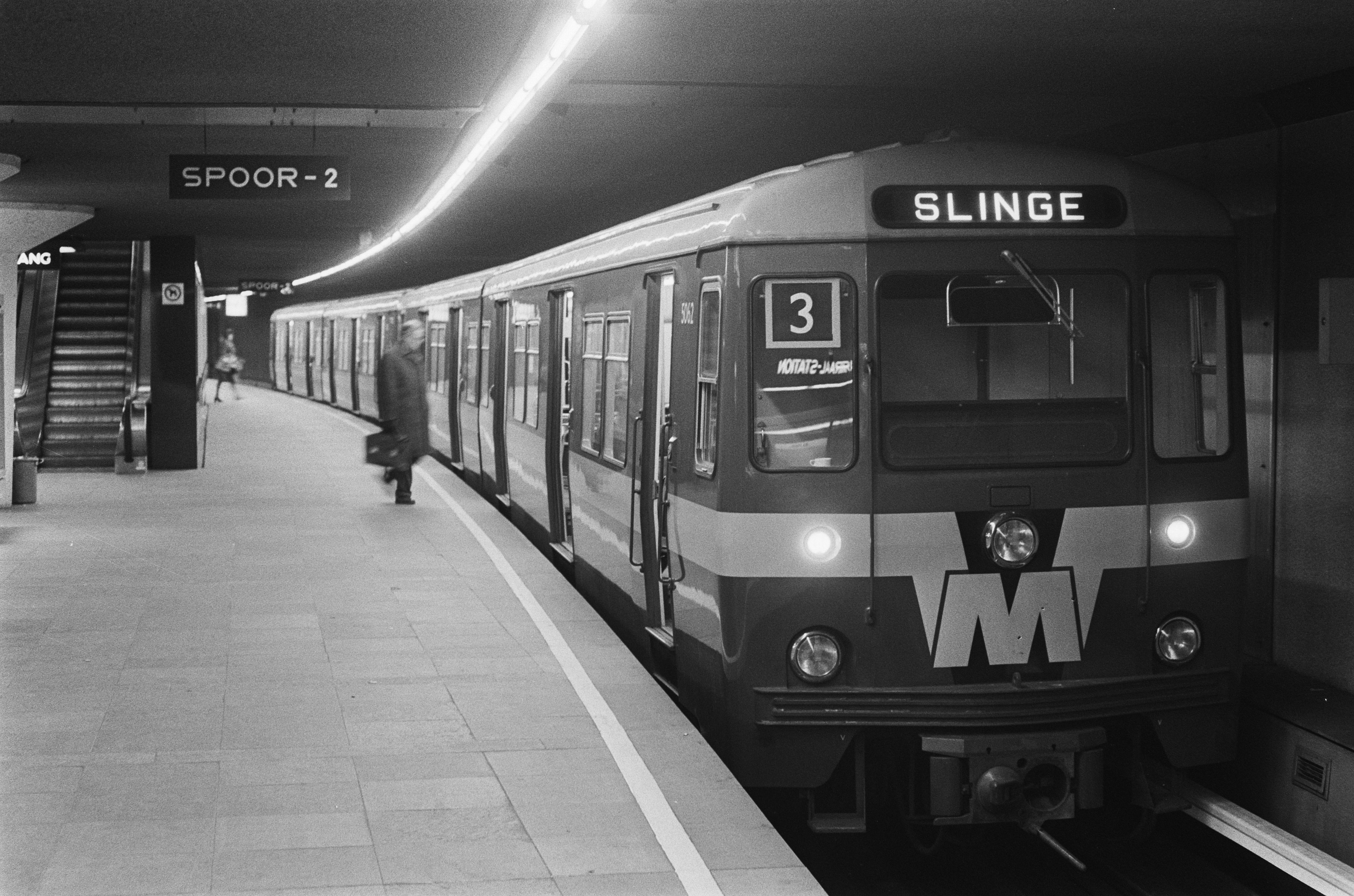
First train series of the Rotterdam Metro, built by Werkspoor

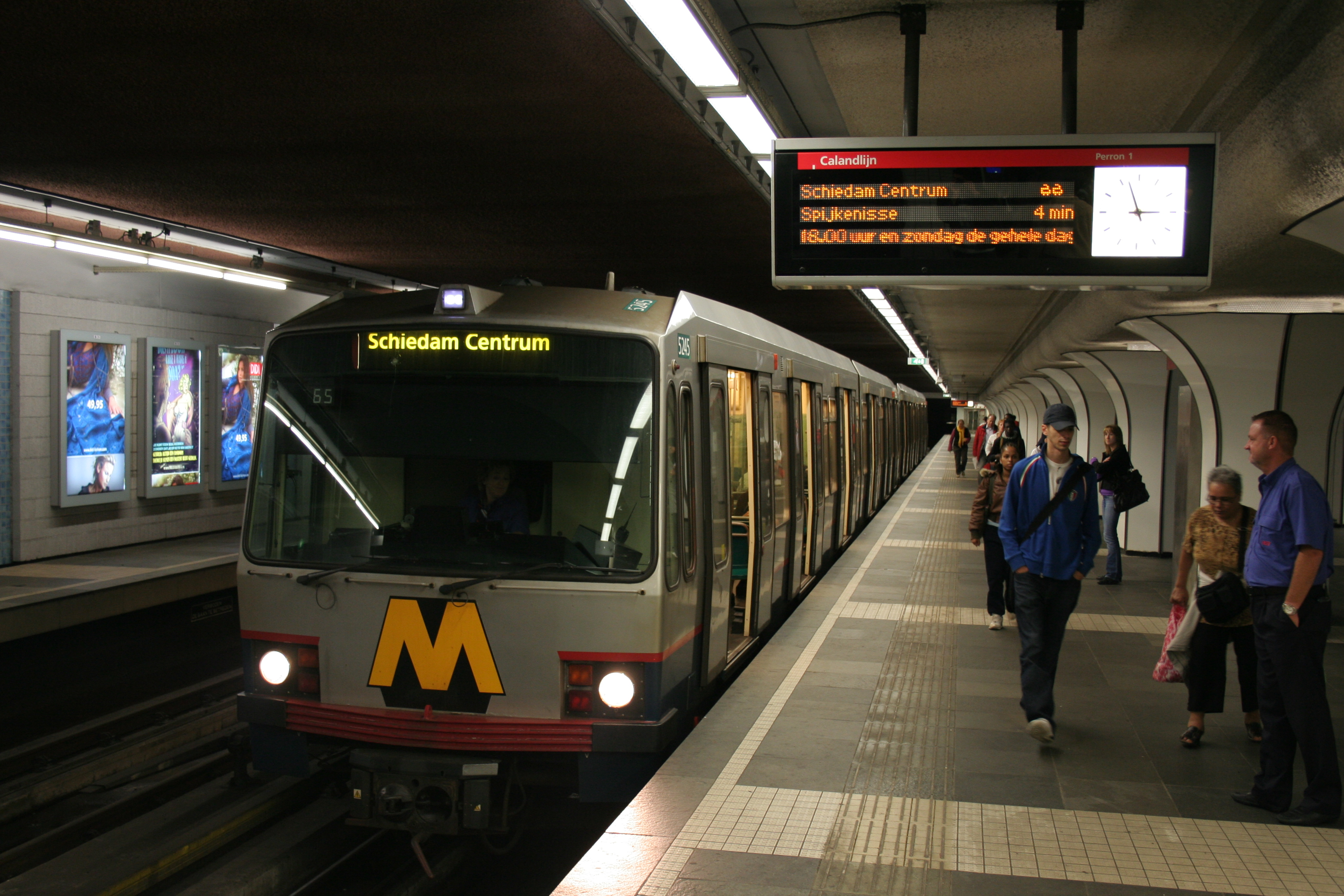
A series 5200 train, built by Duewag

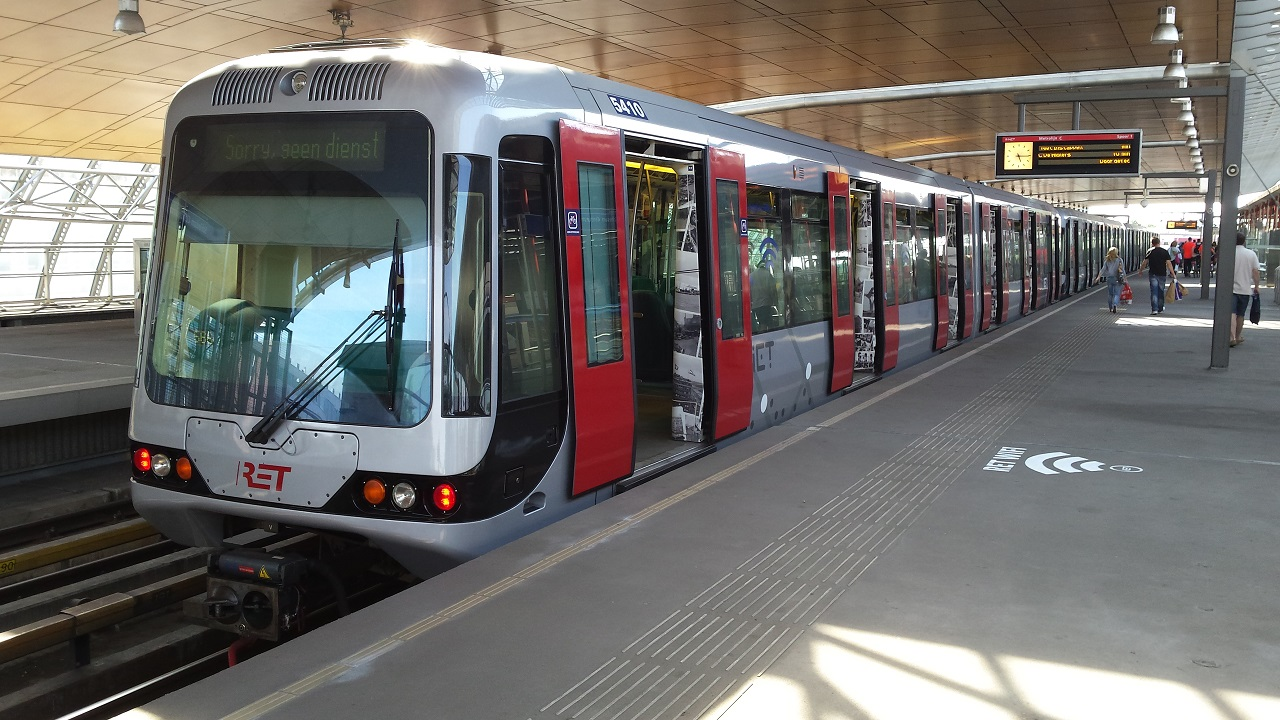
A series 5400 train, built by Bombardier

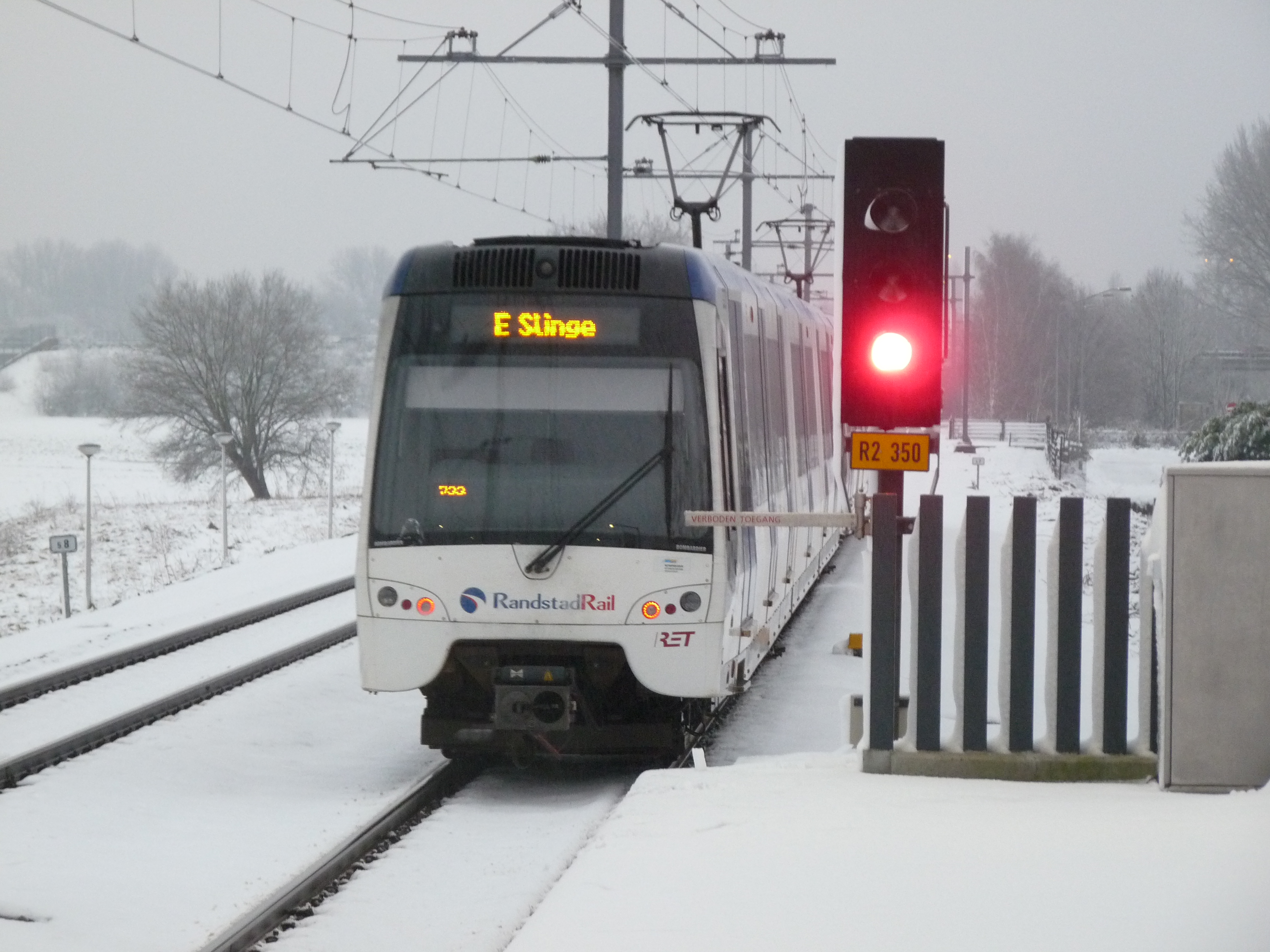
The new train for RandstadRail, built by Bombardier (5501)

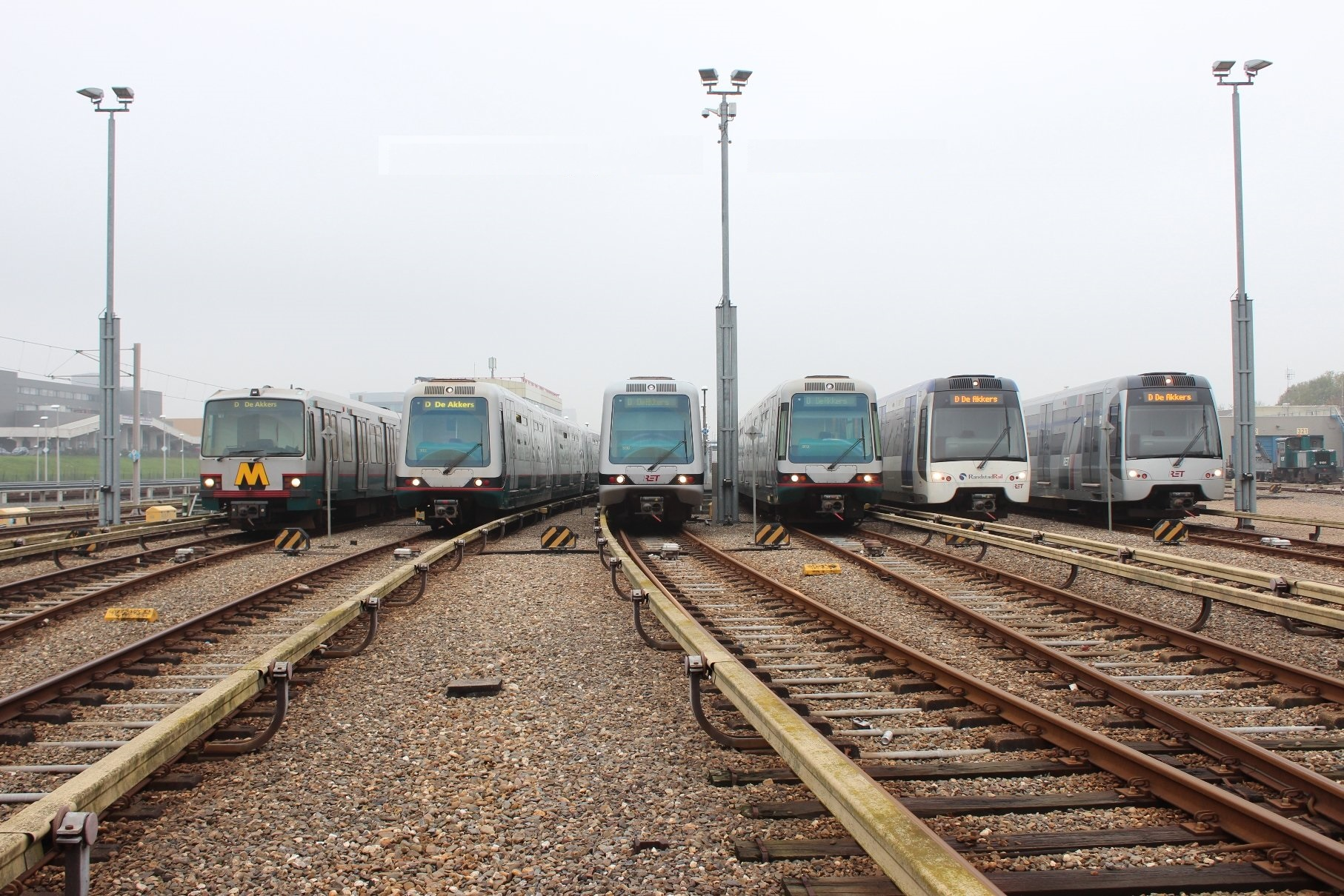
Train in order from left to right: 5239, 5322, 5350, 5408, 5513 and 5631

== Traction power ==
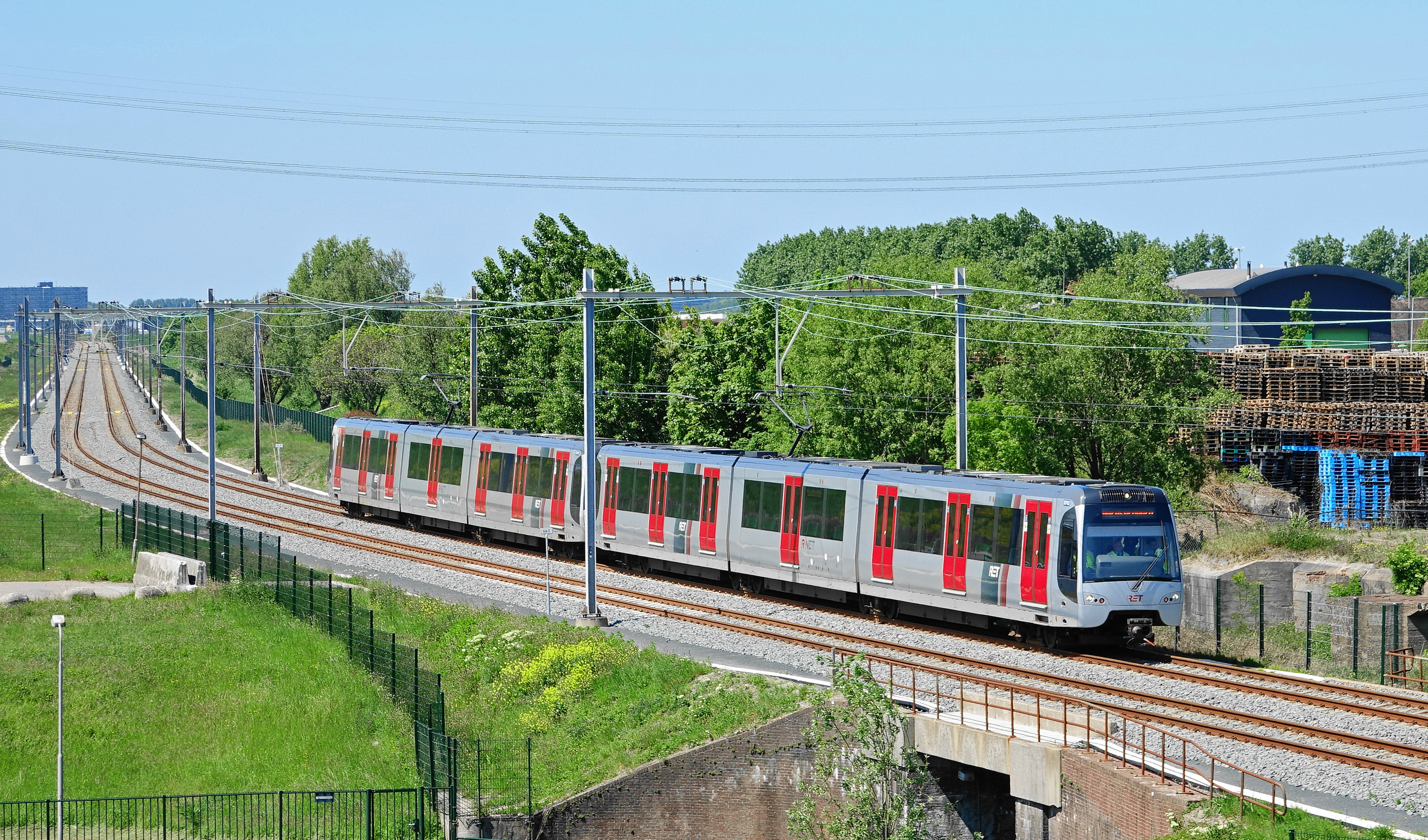
A Bombardier 5700 series EMU between Vlaardingen and Hoek van Holland

Trains run on 750 volts DC power which is supplied through a bottom-contact third rail throughout most of the system. There are multiple spring-loaded contact shoes on both sides of the vehicle, which are loaded and unloaded automatically due to the slanted edges of third rail ends. This allows the rail to be installed on either side of the track, a necessity around points and station platforms. There is sufficient overlap between the two rails on either end to avoid a "gapped" train, a situation where none of the shoes are in contact with the live rail. To reduce the risk of electrocution, the rail consists of a sturdy yellow insulating material, with the live current carried on a thick metal strip on the bottom side. This also guards against grime (such as from fallen autumn leaves) reducing or preventing electrical contact.

Three lines do however have sections that use overhead wires. These are lines A (towards Binnenhof), B (towards Nesselande), and E (towards Den Haag Centraal). On lines A and B, trains raise or lower their pantographs while the vehicle is in motion just east of Capelsebrug station, while on line E this happens while stationary at Melanchtonweg station (this leads to the only level crossing with third rail in the country being at the Kleiweg just outside the tunnel heading to Blijdorp station). Note that Line B trains switch back to third rail for the final leg of the journey, from the penultimate station De Tochten to Nesselande. The western extension of lines A and B to Hook of Holland also use overhead power as they are converted directly from the existing railway line.

The sections of the metro that use overhead wires are called sneltram (light rail) by locals, as they include several protected level crossings at street level, which trains pass through with priority, as in a conventional railway line. For this reason, trains with a pantograph (series 5200 and 5400) are equipped with turn signals just like any road vehicle. This makes it easy to see the difference between series 5300 and series 5400 Bombardier-built trains. Series 5500 and 5600 trains are also equipped, although the former is normally used on line E only as they carry the RandstadRail branding and livery while the latter carries that of R-net.

== See also ==
- List of Rotterdam Metro stations
- RandstadRail
- Trams in Rotterdam
- List of metro systems
- De Akkers metro station crash
