= De Akkers metro station =

Metro station in Spijkenisse, Netherlands

De Akkers
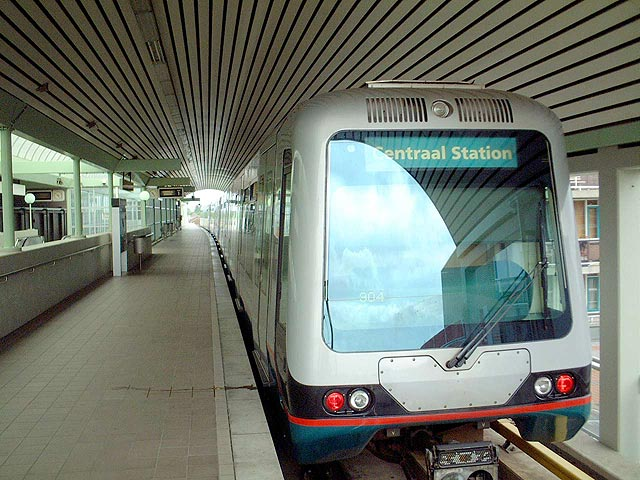

General information
- Coordinates: 51°50′0″N 4°19′11″E
- System: Rotterdam Metro station
- Owner: RET
- Platforms: Island platform
- Tracks: 2

History
- Opened: 1985

Services
Preceding station	Rotterdam Metro	Following station
Terminus	Line C	Heemraadlaan towards De Terp
Terminus	Line D	Heemraadlaan towards Rotterdam Centraal
Location

De Akkers (Dutch pronunciation: [də ˈʔɑkərs]) is the most southwestern subway station of the Rotterdam Metro and is located in the Dutch city of Spijkenisse. The station, with one island platform, opened on 25 April 1985 as a terminus of the North-South Line (also formerly called Erasmus line), nowadays line D. Since the extension of the East-West Line (Caland line) opened on 4 November 2002, the station also serves as terminus of that line. The station is named for the adjacent neighbourhood and is located on top of its shopping mall.

== Whale tail sculpture ==
In 2002, two whale sculptures, designed by architect Maarten Struijs and named Walvisstaarten (Dutch for Whale's tails) were installed at the end of the sidings beyond the station. The sculptures were made of reinforced polyester.

== Train crash ==
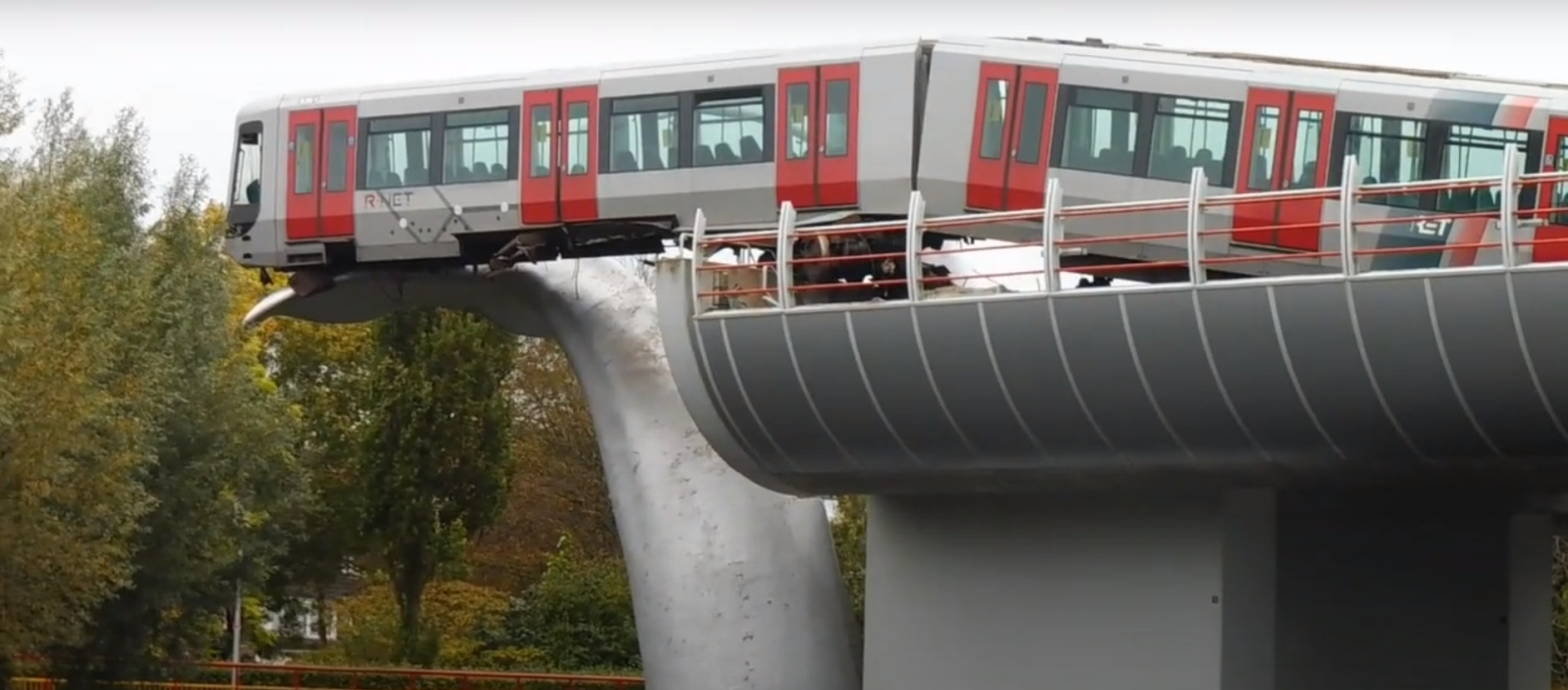
The train came to a rest on a sculpture of a whale

Just after midnight on 2 November 2020, a train empty of passengers, operated by RET, on the Rotterdam Metro crashed through the buffer stop at the end of the sidings beyond the station. The sidings are built on a viaduct projecting out over the canal. The lead car of the train came to a partial rest on a 10-metre (33 ft) high whale sculpture erected in front of the sidings, preventing the train from falling over the edge and into the canal below. Only the driver was on board when the crash happened and he freed himself without injury. He was taken to hospital as a precautionary measure.

Following the crash, the creator of the sculpture, Maarten Struijs, stated he was surprised the statue was able to hold the weight of the train, and stated that "it does look rather poetic." He said the statue was never meant to be an extra safety measure for the trains.

Since the crash, these sculptures have been referred to in some media with the name Saved by a Whale's Tail.
