= Transport in Rotterdam =

Rotterdam has an extensive public transport network consisting of the metro, its own tram system, buses, trains, water buses, and international ferries.

== Public transport ==
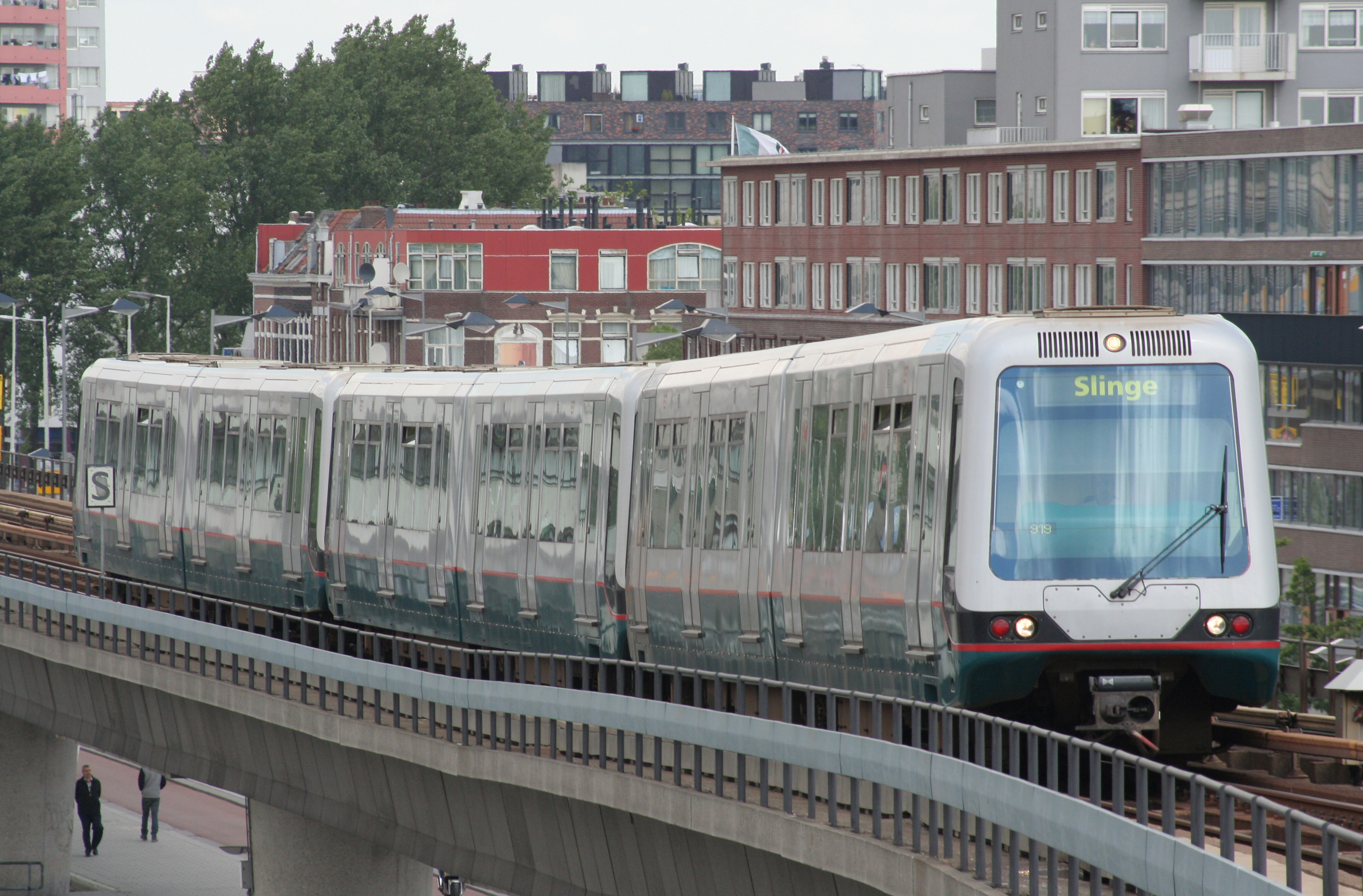
Rotterdam metro

In Rotterdam, public transport services are provided by Nederlandse Spoorwegen (national train services), Rotterdamse Elektrische Tram (RET, Rotterdam Electric Tram; tram, city bus, metro, RandstadRail and ferry services in Rotterdam and surrounding cities). Arriva Netherlands, Connexxion, Qbuzz and Veolia all provide private regional bus services.

=== Metro ===
In 1968, Rotterdam was the first Dutch city to open a metro system. The metro system consists of three main lines, each of which has its own variants. The metro network has 78.3 km (48.7 mi) of rail tracks, and there are 70 stations, which makes it the biggest of the Benelux. 5 lines operate the system: 3 lines (A, B and C) on the east–west line and two (D and E) on the north–south line. Line E (RandstadRail) connects Rotterdam with The Hague as of December 2011.

Map of the 2020 Rotterdam metro

Line	Southern / western terminus	Northern / eastern terminus	Additional info
Line A	Vlaardingen West	Binnenhof	Terminates at Schiedam Centrum outside peak hours.
Line B	Hoek van Holland Strand	Nesselande	
Line C	De Akkers	De Terp	
Line D	De Akkers	Rotterdam Centraal	
Line E	Slinge	Den Haag Centraal	

=== Tram ===
The Rotterdam tramway network offers 9 regular tram lines and 4 special tram lines with a total length of 93.4 km (58.0 mi).

Line	Termini	Route	Transport Company	Details
1	De Esch - Vlaardingen, Holy	Erasmus Universiteit, Oostplein, Station Blaak, Beurs, Rotterdam Centraal, Marconiplein, Station Schiedam Centrum, Station Nieuwland	RET	
2	Keizerswaard - Charlois	Station Lombardijen, Randweg, Hillevliet, Maashaven	RET	
3	Beverwaard - Rotterdam Centraal	Stadion Feijenoord, Wilhelminaplein, Leuvehaven, Beurs	RET	
4	Molenlaan - Heemraadsplein	Station Noord, Rotterdam Centraal, Eendrachtsplein	RET	
5	Carnisselande - Rotterdam Centraal	Groene Hilledijk, Randweg, Wilhelminaplein, Leuvehaven, Beurs	RET	
6	Kleiweg - Heemraadsplein	Station Noord, Rotterdam Centraal, Eendrachtsplein	RET	
7	Woudestein - Marconiplein	Erasmus Universiteit, Voorschoterlaan, Oostplein, Rotterdam Centraal	RET	
8	Spangen - Schiebroek	Marconiplein, Delfshaven, Erasmus MC, Eendrachtsplein, Rotterdam Centraal, Sint Franciscus Gasthuis, Melanchthonweg	RET	
11	De Esch - Schiedam, Woudhoek	Erasmus Universiteit, Oostplein, Station Blaak, Beurs, Rotterdam Centraal, Marconiplein, Station Schiedam Centrum, Station Nieuwland	RET	Does not run at night after 20:00, or on Sunday mornings.

The following two tramlines are seasonal lines or special lines:

Line	Termini	Transport Company	Details
10	Citytour Line 10	Rotterdam Public Transport Museum	Summer-only historical tourist tramline; outside of summer, the tram is available for rent for parties or marriages. Driven with historic Rotterdam trams.
12	Rotterdam Centraal - Stadion Feyenoord - Park+Ride Beverwaard	RET	Football-tram: only operates during big events or big matches in De Kuip (Feyenoord Stadium).

=== RandstadRail ===
Map of the RandstadRail network between The Hague (northwest), Zoetermeer (northeast) and Rotterdam (south) as of 2021

The RandstadRail network consists of four routes: one metro line (E) between The Hague and Rotterdam, and three tram-train lines (3, 4 and 34) between The Hague and Zoetermeer. Line E is operated by RET and uses high-floor Flexity Swift vehicles, while lines 3, 4 and 34 are operated by HTM and use low-floor RegioCitadis vehicles. Stations that are served by both types of carriages have extended platforms with a higher and a lower part.

Line	Route	Stations	Opened	Type
E	Den Haag Centraal – Rotterdam Slinge	23	2006	High-floor
3	Den Haag Loosduinen – Zoetermeer Centrum-West	39	2007	Low-floor
4	Den Haag De Uithof – Lansingerland-Zoetermeer	33	2006	Low-floor
34	Den Haag De Savornin Lohmanplein – Lansingerland-Zoetermeer	31	2020	Low-floor

=== Bus ===
Rotterdam offers 55 city bus lines with a total length of 432.7 km (268.9 mi).

RET runs buses in the city of Rotterdam and surrounding places like Barendrecht, Ridderkerk, Rhoon, Poortugaal, Schiedam, Vlaardingen, Delft and Capelle aan den IJssel.

Arriva Netherlands, Connexxion, Qbuzz and Veolia run buses from other cities to Rotterdam. An automated bus service, ParkShuttle, runs between Kralingse Zoom metro station and the Rivium Business Park in Capelle aan den IJssel.

=== Waterbus ===
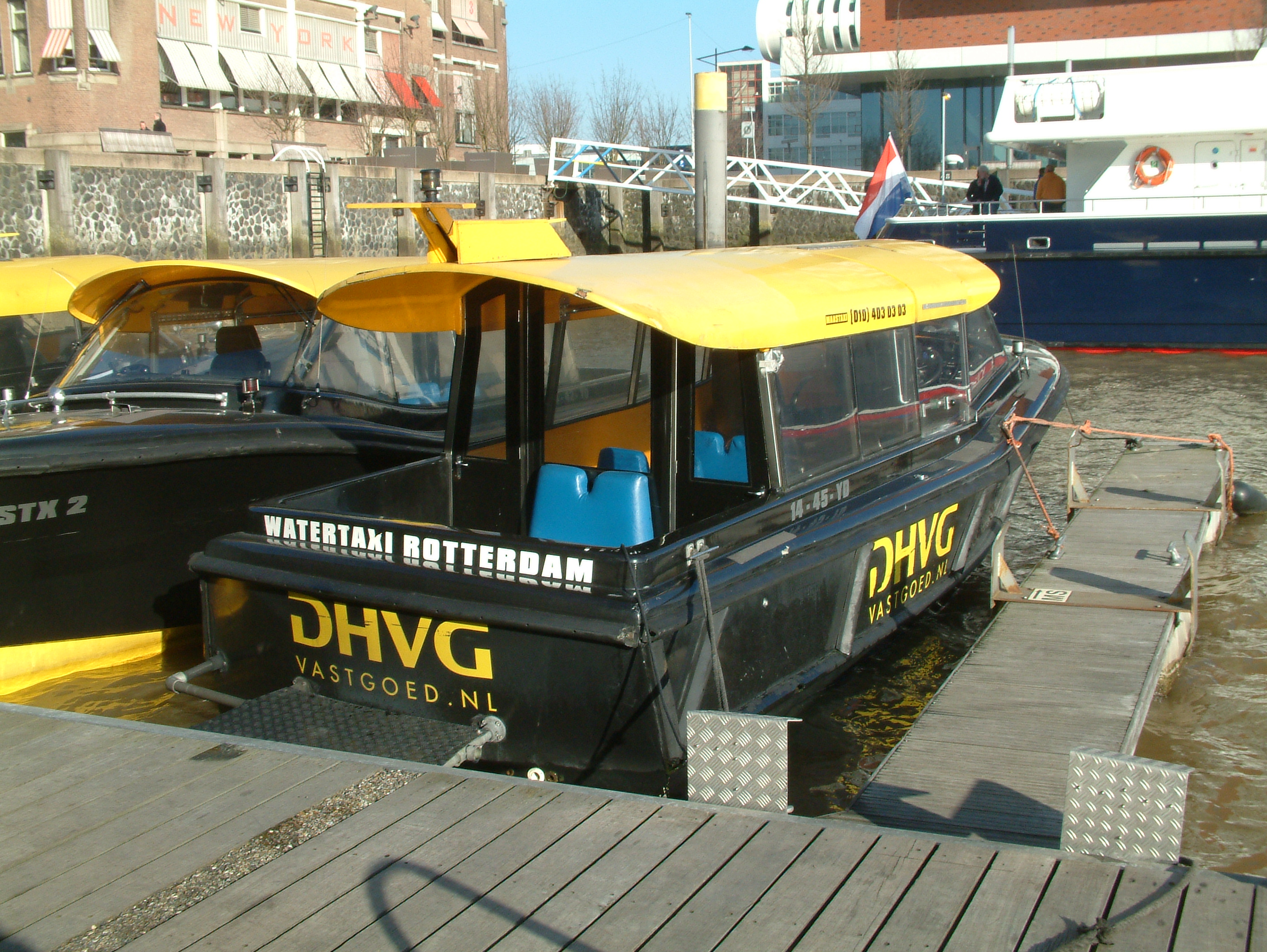
Water Taxi in Rotterdam

The Waterbus network consists of seven lines. The mainline (Line 20) stretches from Rotterdam to Dordrecht. The ferry carries about 130 passengers, and there is space for 60 bicycles. The stops between Rotterdam and Dordrecht are:

- Rotterdam Erasmusbrug – Krimpen aan den IJssel Stormpolder – Ridderkerk De Schans – Alblasserdam Kade – Hendrik-Ido-Ambacht Noordeinde – Papendrecht Westeind – Dordrecht Merwekade.

== Road ==
There are several motorways to/from Rotterdam. The following four are part of its 'Ring' (ring road):

- A20 (Ring North): Hook of Holland – Rotterdam – Gouda
- A16 (Ring East): Rotterdam – Breda (– Antwerp – Paris)
- A15 (Ring South): Europoort – Rotterdam – Nijmegen
- A4 (Ring West): Rotterdam – The Hague (– Amsterdam)

The following two other motorways also serve Rotterdam:

- A13 (Amsterdam –) The Hague – Delft – Rotterdam
- A29 (Antwerp –): Bergen op Zoom – Rotterdam

== Air ==
Rotterdam The Hague Airport (formerly Rotterdam Airport, Vliegveld Zestienhoven in Dutch) is an international airport serving Rotterdam, the Netherlands' second largest city, and The Hague, its administrative and royal capital. Located 5.5 kilometres (3.4 mi; 3.0 nmi) north northwest of Rotterdam, it is the third busiest airport in the Netherlands.

The airport handled over 2.1 million passengers in 2019 and features scheduled flights to European metropolitan and leisure destinations. It is also used extensively by general aviation and there are several flying clubs, a skydiving club and a flight training school located at the airport.

== Rail ==
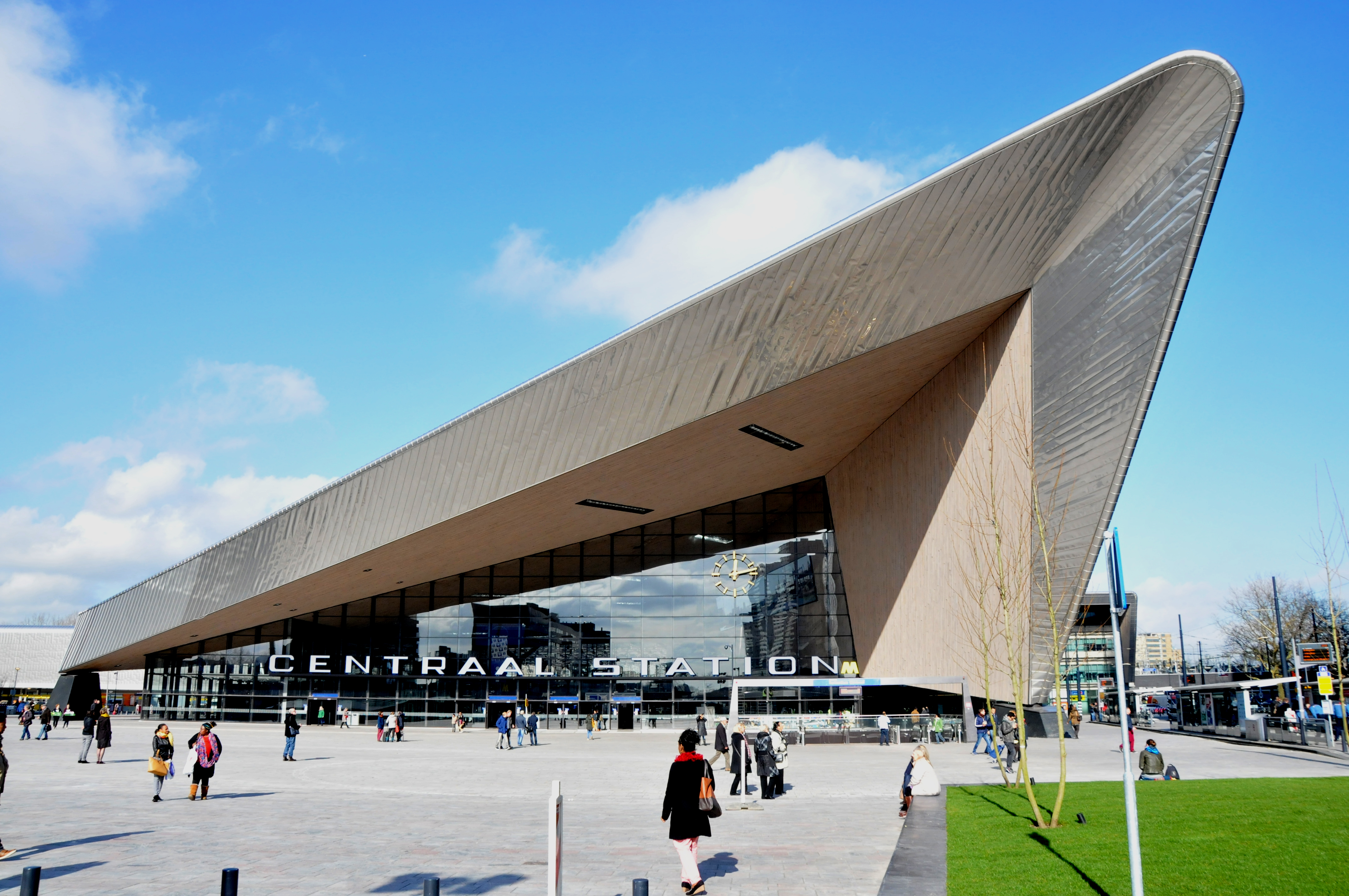
Rotterdam's new Central Station reopened in March 2014, designed to handle up to 320,000 passengers daily.

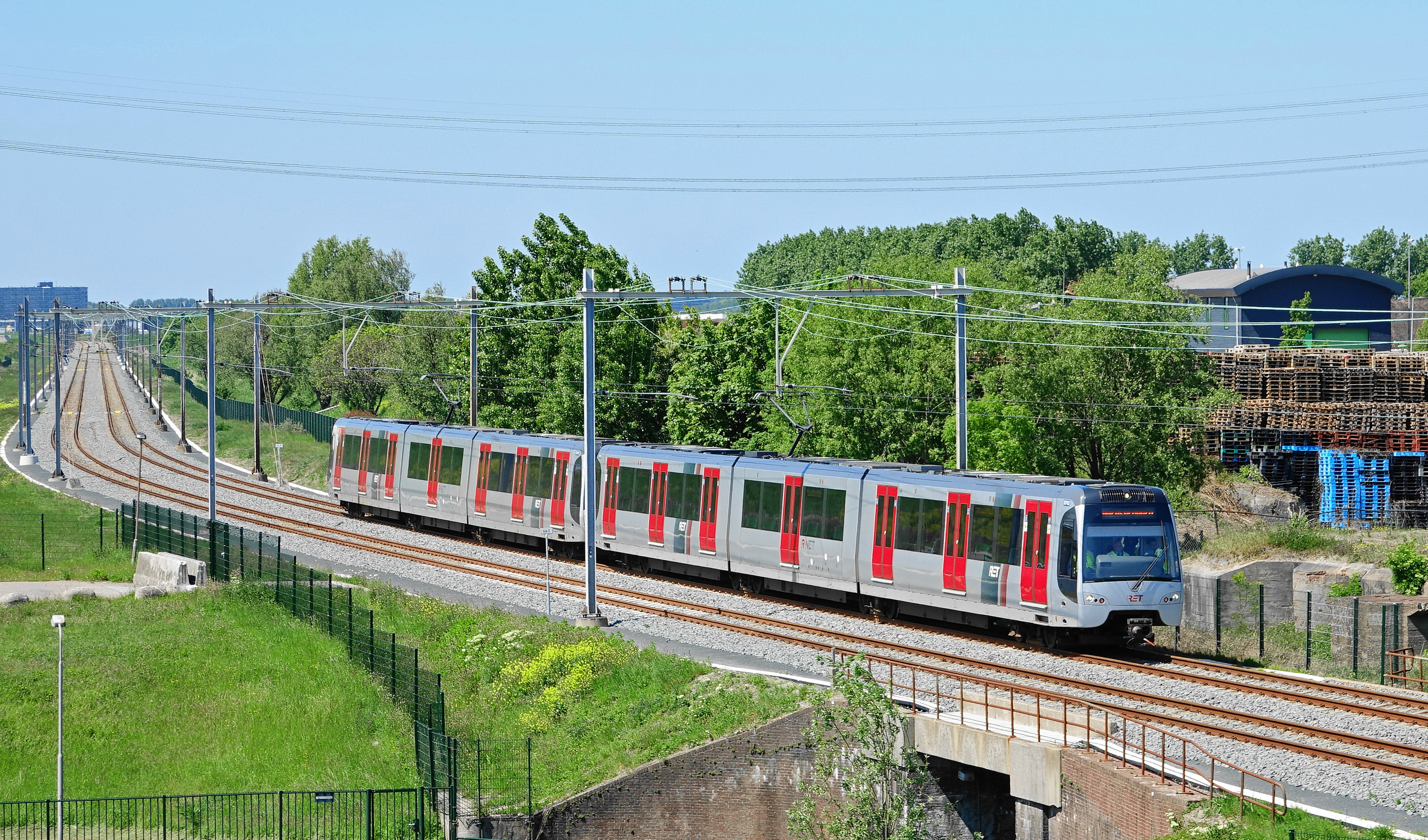
A Bombardier 5700 series EMU between Vlaardingen and Hoek van Holland

Rotterdam is well connected to the Dutch railway network and has several international connections. Direct international services are available to Belgium, France and the UK via the high-speed train system Eurostar. The launch of services to the UK was postponed due to the COVID-19 pandemic.

Traveling to the South, passengers can reach Dordrecht, Breda, Eindhoven, Flushing (Vlissingen) and with international connections, Antwerp, Brussels and Paris can be reached. To the west, a metro line operates to Hook of Holland since 2019.

To the north and northwest, passengers can connect to The Hague, Leiden, Amsterdam and Schiphol using high-speed rail, Utrecht and further. A fifth alternative train system to The Hague, the Hofplein Line was converted to the light rail system RandstadRail in 2006. The city is often mentioned as the terminus of the Eurasian Land Bridge.

Night services every hour every day of the week are available connecting Rotterdam to Delft, The Hague, Leiden, Schiphol, Amsterdam, and, with a detour, Utrecht. On Thursdays, Fridays and Saturdays night, services are also available to Den Bosch, Eindhoven, Tilburg and Roosendaal.

=== Railway stations ===
- Rotterdam Centraal – Rotterdam's main station
- Rotterdam Alexander – Eastern part of Rotterdam
- Rotterdam Blaak – Close to the centre of Rotterdam
- Rotterdam Lombardijen – Most southern part of Rotterdam
- Rotterdam Noord – Northern part of Rotterdam
- Rotterdam Zuid – Northern part of the Southern part of Rotterdam
- Rotterdam Stadion – A station near the Feyenoord stadium, open in connection with football matches and music concerts

== Sea ==
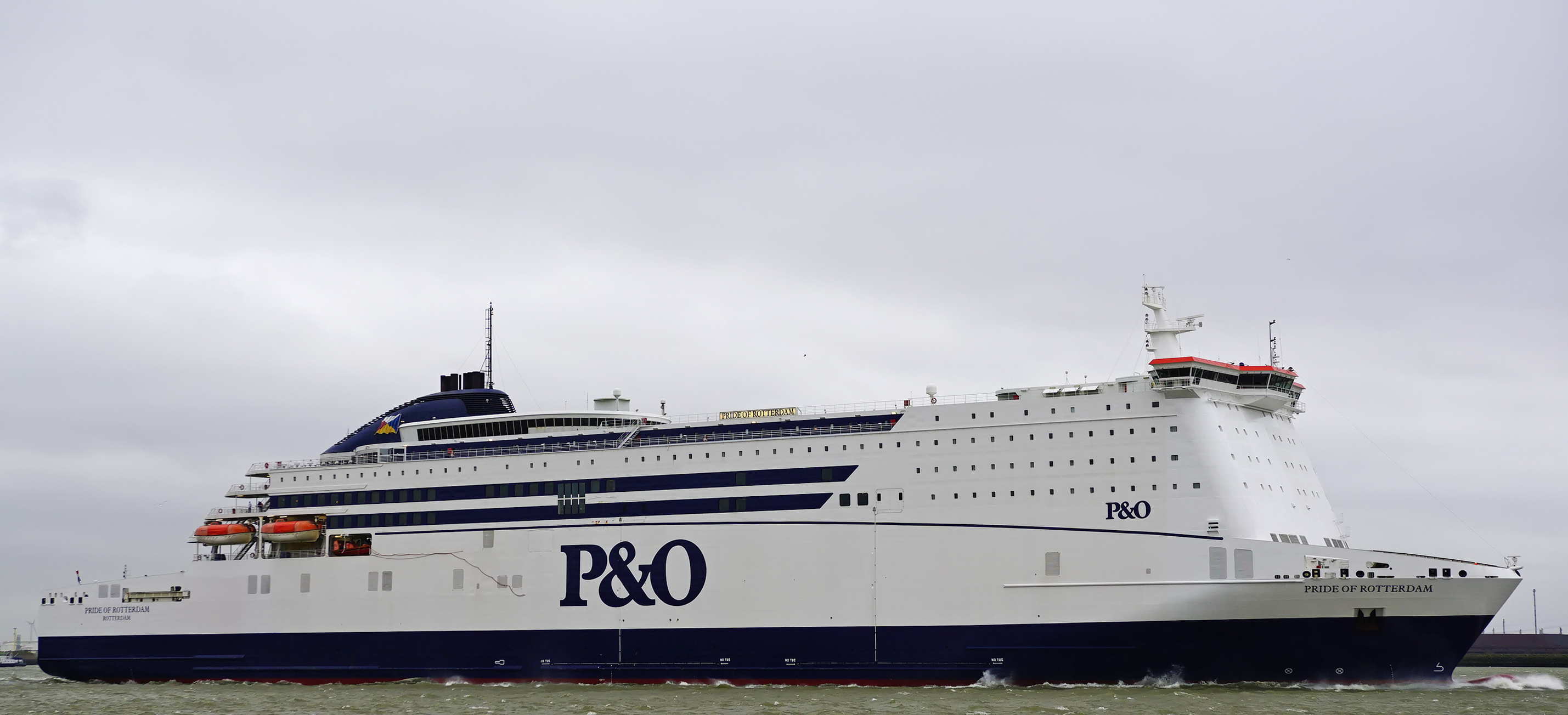
P&O ferry MS Pride of Rotterdam in Europoort.

P&O Ferries has daily sailings from Europoort to Kingston upon Hull in the UK. From the nearby Hoek van Holland (adjacent to the of Port of Rotterdam), Stena Line sails daily to Harwich in the UK.

Rotterdam is also home to the largest seaport in Europe and the world's largest seaport outside of Asia. Located in and near the city of Rotterdam, in the province of South Holland in the Netherlands, from 1962 until 2004, it was the world's busiest port by annual cargo tonnage. In 2020, Rotterdam was the world's tenth-largest container port in terms of twenty-foot equivalent units (TEU) handled. In 2017, Rotterdam was also the world's tenth-largest cargo port in terms of annual cargo tonnage.

Covering 105 square kilometres (41 sq mi), the port of Rotterdam now stretches over a distance of 40 kilometres (25 mi). It consists of the city centre's historic harbour area, including Delfshaven; the Maashaven/Rijnhaven/Feijenoord complex; the harbours around Nieuw-Mathenesse; Waalhaven; Vondelingenplaat; Eemhaven; Botlek; Europoort, situated along the Calandkanaal, Nieuwe Waterweg and Scheur (the latter two being continuations of the Nieuwe Maas); and the reclaimed Maasvlakte area, which projects into the North Sea. The Port of Rotterdam is located in the middle of the Rhine-Meuse-Scheldt delta. Rotterdam has five port concessions (ports) within its boundaries—operated by separate companies under the overall authority of Rotterdam.

== The RoMeO Foundation ==
The Foundation RoMeO (Rotterdam Public Transport Museum and Exploitation of Oldtimers) was founded in 1997. It consists of sixty trams, twenty buses and an underground metro from 1967. Since 2010, the Rotterdam Public Transport Museum has been housed in the monumental tram depot Hillegersberg from 1923.
