= Rotterdam Centraal station =

Railway station in Rotterdam, Netherlands

Rotterdam Centraal
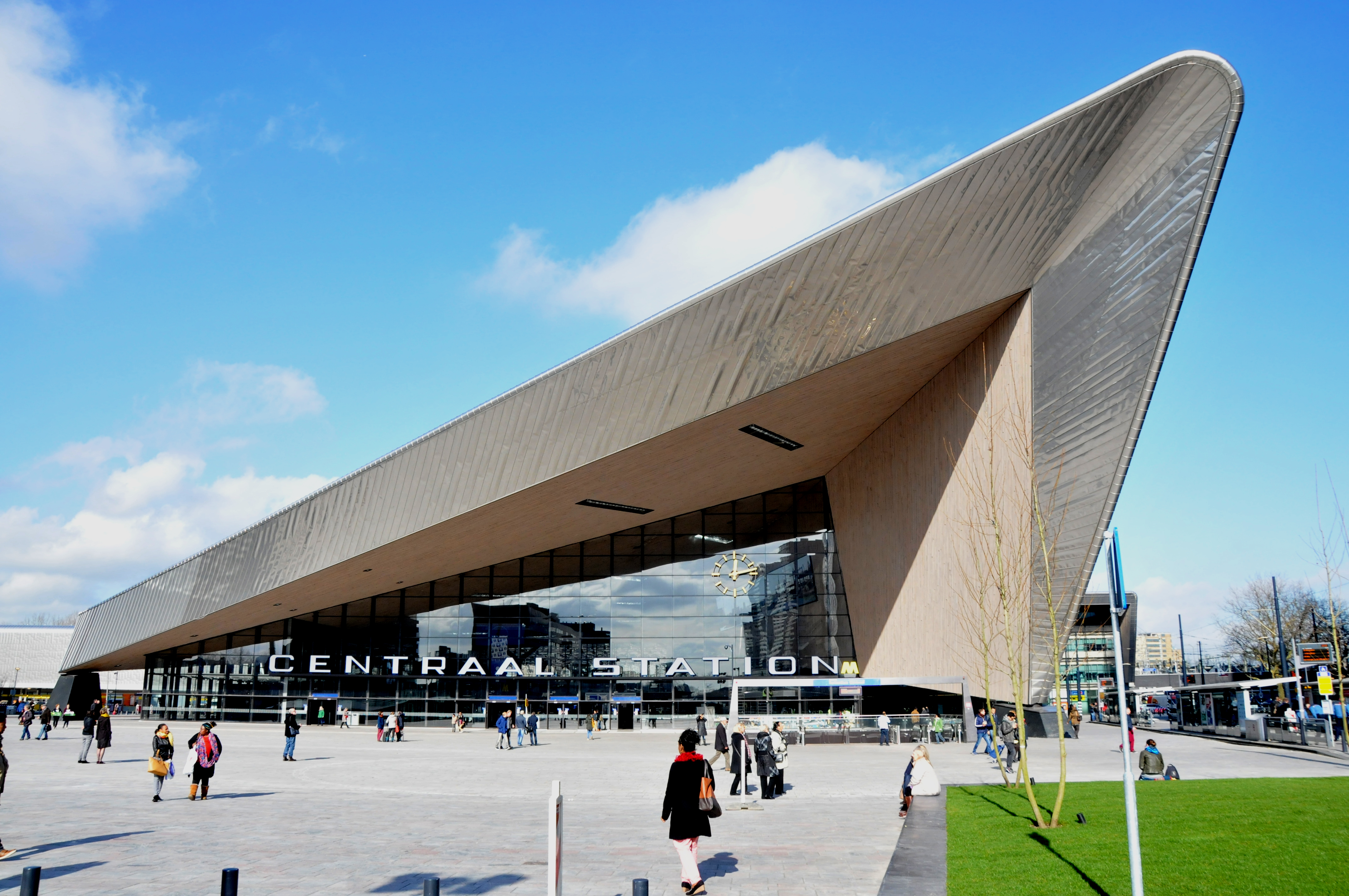
- The station building in February 2014

General information
- Location: Stationsplein 8a Rotterdam; Netherlands
- Coordinates: 51°55′28″N 4°28′10″E
- Operator: NS; NS International; Eurostar; European Sleeper
- Lines: Amsterdam–Rotterdam railway; Breda–Rotterdam railway; HSL-Zuid; Utrecht–Rotterdam railway
- Tracks: 13
- Bus operators: : 33, 38, 39, 40, 44, 48; : 860, 867; : 824
- Connections: Metro: D E; Tram: 1, 3, 4, 5, 6, 7, 8, 11, 12

Construction
- Parking: 97 spaces
- Cycle facilities: Parking station, racks, repair shop
- Accessible: Yes

Other information
- Station code: Rtd
- Website: mijnstation.nl/en/rotterdam

History
- Opened: 1847; 179 years ago (first); 21 May 1957; 69 years ago (train); 9 February 1968; 58 years ago (metro/subway); March 2014; 12 years ago current building)

Passengers
- 2023: 104,840 per day (train); 23,141 per day (metro)
Services
Preceding station	Eurostar	Following station
Amsterdam Centraal Terminus	Eurostar	Brussels-South towards London St Pancras
Schiphol Airport towards Amsterdam Centraal	Eurostar	Antwerpen-Centraal towards Paris-Nord
Schiphol Airport towards Amsterdam Centraal	Eurostar	Antwerpen-Centraal towards Disneyland Paris
Schiphol Airport towards Amsterdam Centraal	Eurostar (winter)	Antwerpen-Centraal towards Bourg-Saint-Maurice
Schiphol Airport towards Amsterdam Centraal	Eurostar (summer)	Antwerpen-Centraal towards Marseille-Saint-Charles
Preceding station	NS International	Following station
Terminus	Eurocity 9200	Breda towards Brussels-South
Schiphol Airport towards Lelystad Centrum	Eurocity Direct 9500	Antwerpen Centraal towards Brussels-South
Preceding station	Nederlandse Spoorwegen	Following station
Delft towards Den Haag Centraal	NS Intercity 1100	Breda towards Eindhoven Centraal
Delft towards Utrecht Centraal	NS Nachtnet 1400 Night Train, not on Wed	Terminus
Schiphol Airport towards Amersfoort Schothorst	NS Intercity Direct 1800	Breda Terminus
Rotterdam Alexander towards Utrecht Centraal	NS Intercity 2000 Until 20:30	Terminus
Schiedam Centrum towards Amsterdam Centraal	NS Intercity 2200	Rotterdam Blaak towards Vlissingen
Schiedam Centrum towards Amsterdam Centraal	NS Intercity 2300 Mon-Fri until 20:00	Rotterdam Blaak towards Vlissingen
Schiphol Airport towards Lelystad Centrum	NS Intercity Direct 2400 Mon-Sat until 20:00	Terminus
Rotterdam Alexander towards Utrecht Centraal	NS Intercity 2800	Terminus
Delft towards Arnhem Centraal	NS Intercity 3200 Mon-Thurs before 19:00	Terminus
Schiedam Centrum towards Venlo	NS Intercity 3500	Rotterdam Blaak towards Dordrecht
Den Haag HS towards Utrecht Centraal	NS Nachtnet 11400 Wednesday Night only	Terminus
Schiphol Airport towards Amsterdam Zuid	NS Intercity Direct 12400 After 20:00 and Sundays	Terminus
Terminus	NS Nachtnet 21410 Fri, Sat night only	Dordrecht towards Eindhoven Centraal
Rotterdam Noord towards Uitgeest	NS Sprinter 4000	Terminus
Schiedam Centrum towards Den Haag Centraal	NS Sprinter 5000 Mon-Fri until 20:00	Rotterdam Blaak towards Dordrecht
Schiedam Centrum towards Den Haag Centraal	NS Sprinter 5100	Rotterdam Blaak towards Dordrecht
Schiedam Centrum towards Den Haag Centraal	NS Sprinter 5200 Mon-Thu until 19:00	Rotterdam Blaak towards Dordrecht
Preceding station	European Sleeper	Following station
Roosendaal towards Brussels-South	Brussels–Prague	Den Haag HS towards Prague
Location
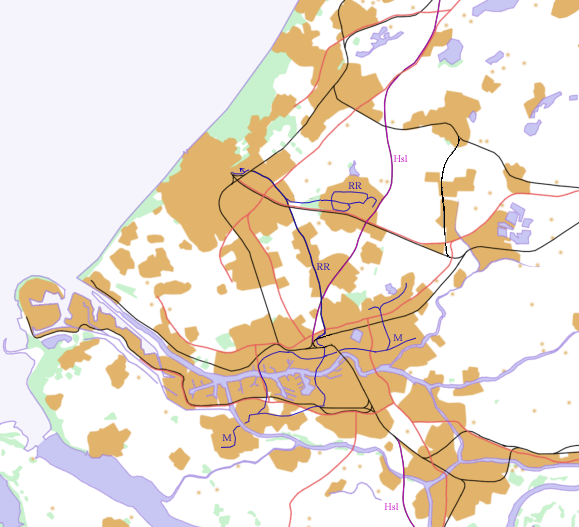
- Location within Southwest Randstad Location within Netherlands

Rotterdam Centraal station (Dutch pronunciation: [ˌrɔtərˈdɑm sɛnˈtraːl]; English: Rotterdam Central station) is the main railway station of the city Rotterdam in South Holland, Netherlands. The station received an average of 112,000 passengers daily in 2019. The current station building, located at Station Square, was officially opened in March 2014.

== History ==
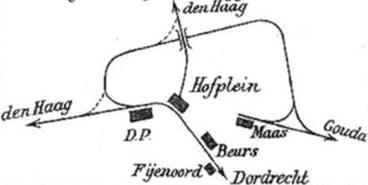
Railways in Rotterdam in 1936.

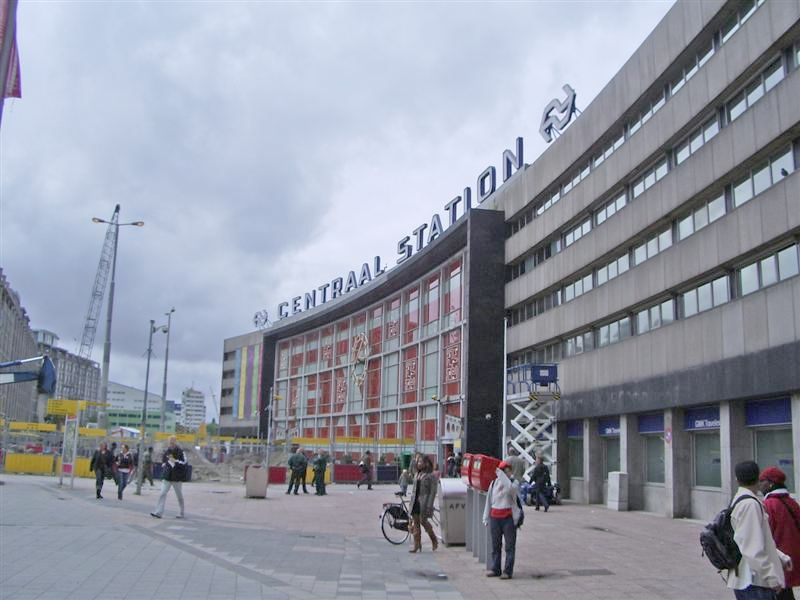
Rotterdam's former Centraal Station by architect Sybold van Ravesteyn built 1950–1957.

Before World War II, Rotterdam did not have a central railway station, instead there were four stations in and around the city centre:

- Rotterdam Delftsche Poort: for westbound trains towards Schiedam, Den Haag HS and Amsterdam CS and eastbound trains towards Dordrecht.
- Rotterdam Beurs: towards Dordrecht, connected to Delftsche Poort.
- Rotterdam Maas: terminus for eastbound trains to Gouda and Utrecht.
- Rotterdam Hofplein: terminus for the Hofpleinlijn, an alternative line to Den Haag HS, also going to Scheveningen.

Delftsche Poort station was badly damaged by bombing in the Rotterdam Blitz, it was replaced by the newly-built Rotterdam Centraal station just west of the site. The station building was designed by architect Sybold van Ravesteyn and was completed on 13 March 1957, officially opening on 21 May. Maas station had also been badly damaged during the bombing in 1940 and closed in 1953, trains from Utrecht were diverted to Rotterdam Centraal station via the new Rotterdam Noord station. The Hofpleinlijn continued to bypass the station until 2006 when it was converted to light rail, becoming part of RandstadRail. Rotterdam Hofplein closed in 2010 after the track was redirected through the new Blijdorp tunnel to connect to the Rotterdam Metro at Rotterdam Centraal.

On 9 February 1968 Princess Beatrix opened the first metro line in the Netherlands at Rotterdam Centraal station. The line connected the station to the south of Rotterdam and is now known as Line D. The first subway station had an island platform with two tracks. On 28 September 2009, a new and more spacious underground station opened right next to the old one, which was immediately demolished. The new station has two island platforms with three tracks.

The mainline station has seven island platforms with thirteen platform tracks. There are three tracks without platform (tracks 2, 5 and 10). In 2007, it was used by approximately 110,000 passengers a day.

The 1957 station building was closed in 2007 and demolished the next year, making it the first major post-war railway station in the Netherlands to be taken down to make way for a new one. The new station was completed and opened in 2014.

== New Rotterdam Centraal ==
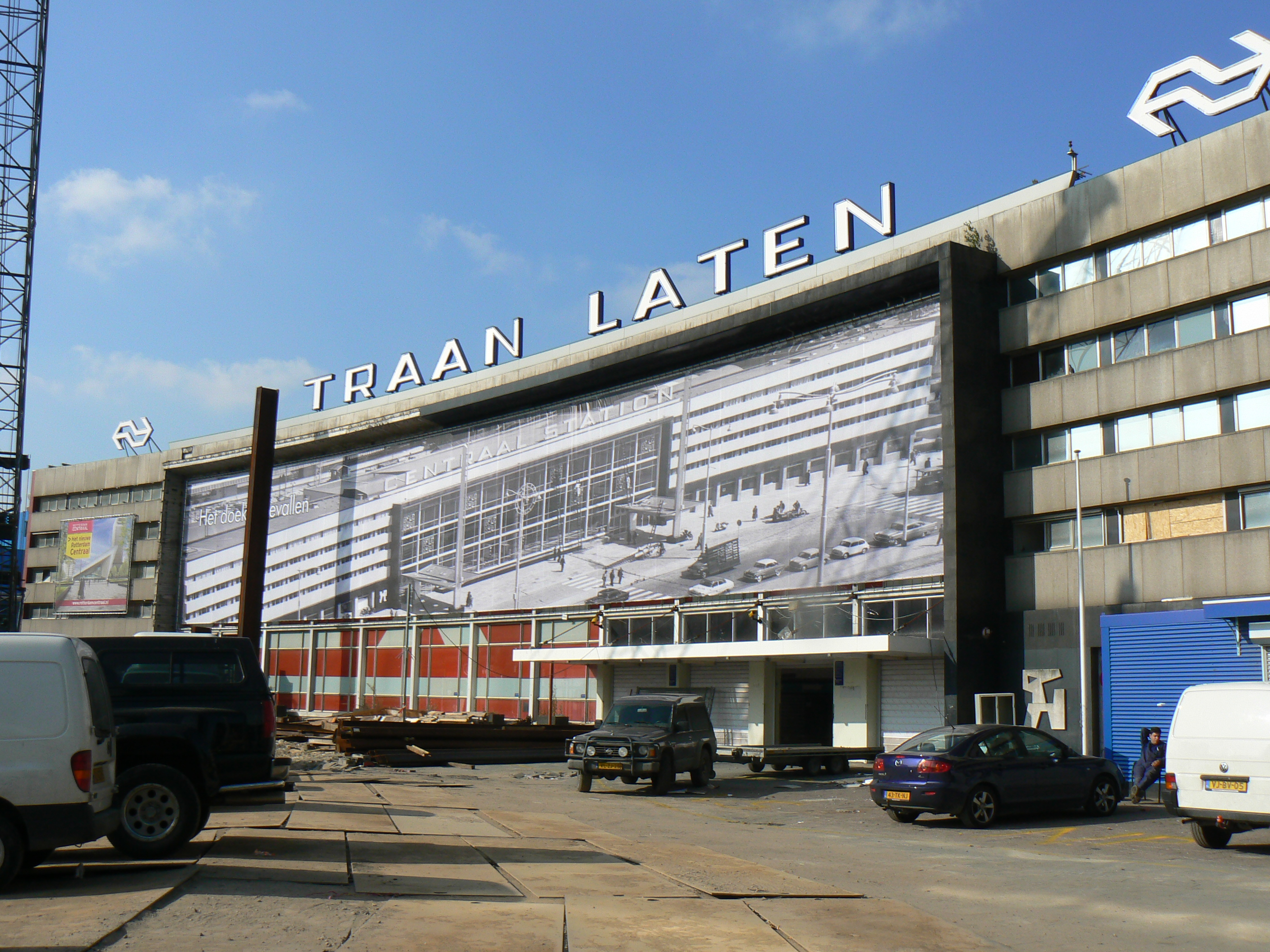
Rearranged roof text spelled the 1957 Central Station's swan song.

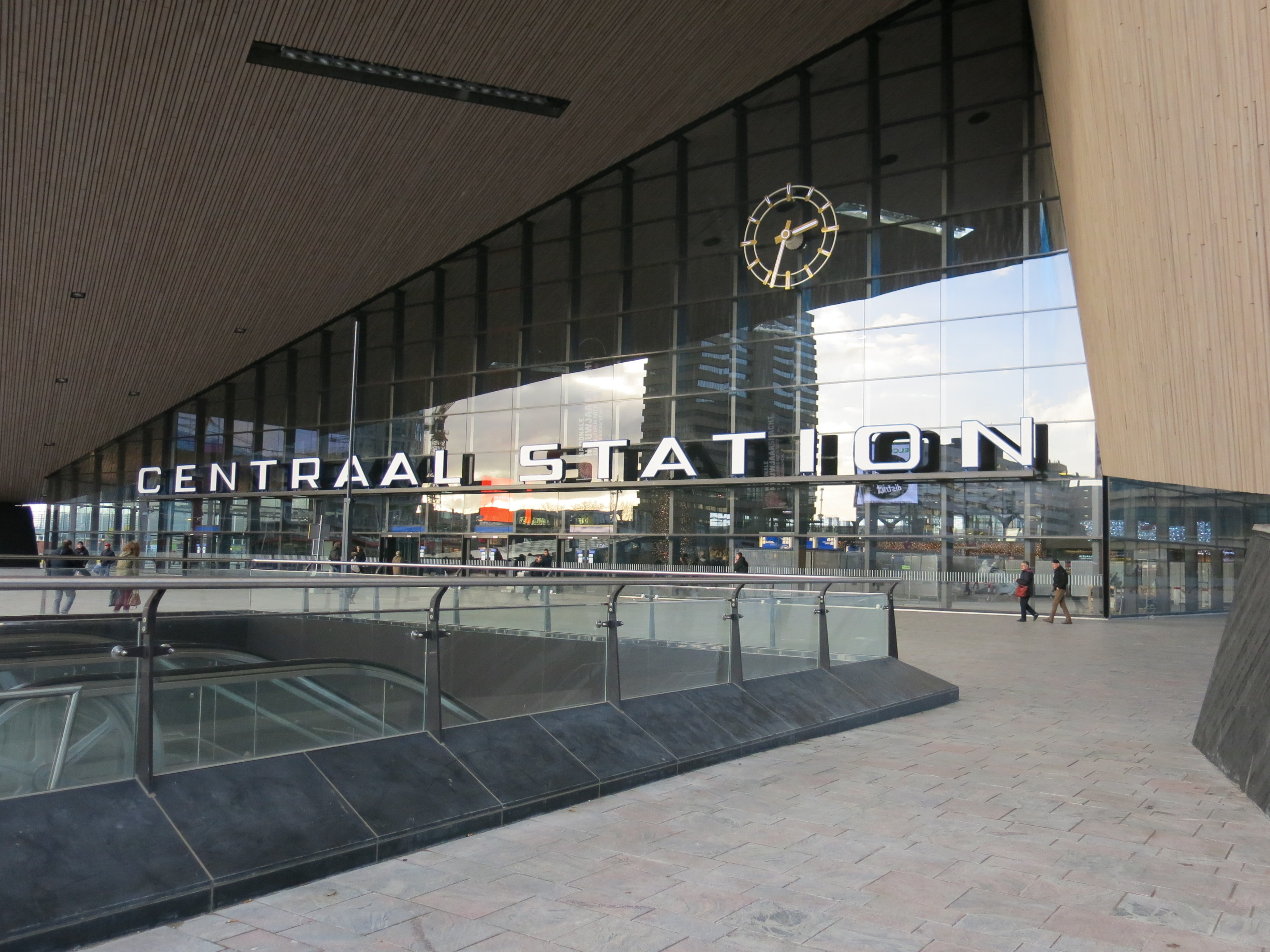
The clock and letters from 1957 were carried over on the new station

A total reconstruction of the station and its surroundings started in 2004 to cope with an increasing number of trains, for example the high-speed train between Amsterdam, Brussels and Paris, and to accommodate for RandstadRail. Furthermore, the existing station, especially the passenger tunnel, also became too small to handle the growing number of passengers. Traveller numbers were projected to be 320,000 per day in 2025. To cope with this increase, a new station was necessary.

In June 2004, ProRail, NS and the Municipality of Rotterdam awarded the contract to Team CS, a cooperative between Benthem Crouwel Architekten, MVSA Meyer & Van Schooten Architects, and West 8, for transforming the existing plans into a design for the new Central Station.

On 16 May 2006 Mayor Ivo Opstelten revealed a work of Onno Poiesz consisting of the word EXIT, which was mounted behind the windows of the facade. Some of the letters "CENTRAAL STATION" that stood on the roof of the station until its closing were put in a different order by Peter Hopman and Margien Reuvekamp of Bureau Lakenvelder to read "TRAAN LATEN" ("SHED A TEAR"). The final closure of the outdated station took place on 2 September 2007 in the presence of Mayor Opstelten, to allow for the demolition of the station. Between 16 January 2008 and the end of March 2008 the station was completely demolished.

Passengers then, for years, had to use amenities housed in a temporary shelter, a smurf-blue building complex on Conrad Street on the northeast corner of the Groothandelsgebouw. The bicycle tunnel served as a temporary passenger tunnel. On 28 November 2012 the six-times-as-large, new passenger tunnel opened, and on 28 August 2013 the renovated bicycle tunnel opened; the so-called biscuits - artworks that had adorned the wings of the former Central Station - are now above the ends of the bicycle tunnel. The full completion of the station was on 13 March 2014, when the station was reopened by King Willem-Alexander. Rotterdam Centraal Station, as the station is now officially called - on the south side, at the explicit request of the citizens of Rotterdam, the name Centraal Station in the lettering that architect Van Ravensteyn had put on the old station, has returned - will obtain the status of world station, as it is on the international high-speed railway towards Belgium. Some modifications to accommodate security screening of Eurostar passengers from the UK were made and finished in March 2018.

In addition to the railway station, the old metro station of Rotterdam Centraal with two tracks and an island platform was renewed and extended to accommodate for the light rail connection to The Hague Central Station. The location of the former island platform is now occupied by switches. The tracks of the RandstadRail Metro Line E were connected to the rest of the metro network with a new tunnel at Rotterdam Central Station. The new metro station has three tracks and two island platforms. Track 1 serves metro line E, part of RandstadRail in the direction Den Haag Central Station. Track 2 is for metro line E towards Slinge; additional services between Slinge - Rotterdam Central vv also use track 2 as terminus of metro line D. Track 3 is between the two island platforms; uniquely the doors of the subway open on both sides while halting at this platform. The latter track is used as the starting point of Metro Line D to the Akkers. On 28 September 2009 the new metro station was opened, after it had been closed for two days. The connection for RandstadRail was officially opened on 16 August 2010, a day after it was available for passenger service.

On 26 March 2014, one of the 60-year-old trees that had to 'move' to allow for the renovation of the station area was placed on Conrad Street.

On 4 February 2020, the Minister of Infrastructure and Water Management, Cora van Nieuwenhuizen, and the UK Transport Secretary, Grant Shapps, announced juxtaposed controls would be established in the station. According to the announcement, starting from 18 May 2020, Eurostar passengers travelling to the UK would clear exit checks from the Schengen Area as well as UK entry checks (conducted by the UK Border Force) in the station before boarding their train (without having to disembark at Brussels-South station, go through the juxtaposed controls there, and board another train to the UK). However, the launch was postponed due to the COVID-19 pandemic. The inauguration of juxtaposed controls in the station subsequently took place on 26 October 2020.

== Train services ==
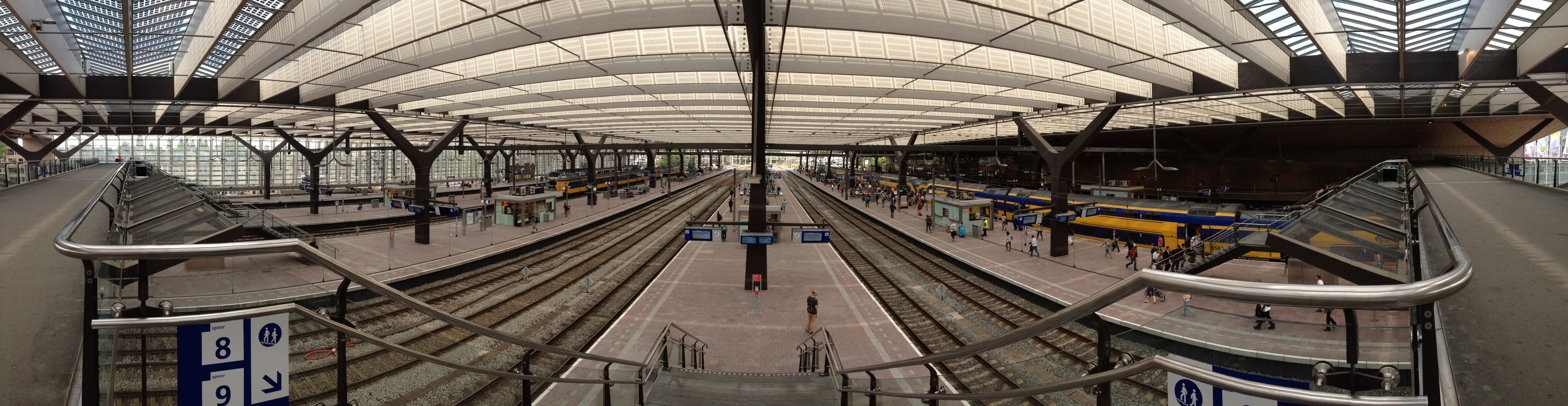
Panorama of the platforms at Rotterdam Centraal in 2014

As one of the four main stations in the Netherlands, Rotterdam Centraal is well connected with cities all over the country. Major destinations include: Amsterdam, Amersfoort, Bergen op Zoom, Breda, Dordrecht, Delft, The Hague (Den Haag), Eindhoven, Gouda, Groningen, Haarlem, Leeuwarden, Leiden, Middelburg, Roosendaal, Tilburg, Utrecht, Venlo, Vlissingen and Zwolle. There are also international services to Antwerp, Brussels and Paris up to fourteen times a day and to Disneyland Paris twice per day. Eurostar services from London to Amsterdam Centraal also call here. Direct services to London were due to start on 18 May 2020, but this was postponed to 26 October due to the COVID-19 pandemic.

As of 2024, the following train services call at this station:

=== International service ===
Series	Operator	Route
Eurostar 9100	Eurostar	Amsterdam Centraal – Rotterdam Centraal – Brussel-Zuid – Lille-Europe – London St Pancras International
Eurostar 9300	Eurostar	Amsterdam Centraal – Schiphol Airport – Rotterdam Centraal – Antwerpen-Centraal – Brussel-Zuid – Paris-Nord
Eurostar 9900	Eurostar	Amsterdam Centraal – Schiphol Airport – Rotterdam Centraal – Antwerpen-Centraal – Brussel-Zuid – [ Aéroport Charles-de-Gaulle 2 TGV – Marne-la-Vallée - Chessy ] / [ Chambéry-Challes-les-Eaux – Albertville – Moûtiers - Salins - Brides-les-Bains – Aime-La Plagne – Landry – Bourg-Saint-Maurice ] / [ Valence-Rhône-Alpes-Sud TGV – Avignon TGV – Aix-en-Provence TGV – Marseille Saint-Charles ]
9200 IC 35	Intercity direct, Beneluxtrein (NS International)	Amsterdam Centraal – Schiphol Airport – Rotterdam Centraal – Breda – Noorderkempen – Antwerpen-Centraal – Mechelen – Brussels Airport-Zaventem – Brussel-Noord – Brussel-Centraal – Brussel-Zuid
ES 450	European Sleeper	Brussel-Zuid – Antwerpen-Centraal – Roosendaal – Rotterdam Centraal – Den Haag HS – Amsterdam Centraal – Amersfoort Centraal – Deventer – Bad Bentheim – Berlin Hbf – Dresden Hbf – Praha hl.n.

=== National service ===
Series	Operator	Route
900	Intercity Direct (NS)	Amsterdam Centraal – Schiphol Airport – Rotterdam Centraal – Breda
1000	Intercity Direct (NS)	Amsterdam Centraal – Schiphol Airport – Rotterdam Centraal
500	Intercity (NS)	Rotterdam Centraal – Utrecht Centraal – Amersfoort Centraal – Zwolle – Assen – Groningen
600	Intercity (NS)	Leeuwarden – Meppel – Zwolle – Amersfoort Centraal – Utrecht Centraal – Rotterdam Centraal
1100	Intercity (NS)	Den Haag Centraal – Den Haag HS – Delft – Rotterdam Centraal – Breda – Tilburg – Eindhoven Centraal
1400	Intercity (NS)	Utrecht Centraal – Amsterdam Centraal – Schiphol Airport – Den Haag HS – Rotterdam Centraal
2200	Intercity (NS)	Amsterdam Centraal – Amsterdam Sloterdijk – Haarlem – Leiden Centraal – Den Haag HS – Delft – Schiedam Centrum – Rotterdam Centraal – Dordrecht – Roosendaal – Vlissingen
2300	Intercity (NS)	Amsterdam Centraal – Amsterdam Sloterdijk – Haarlem – Leiden Centraal – Den Haag HS – Delft – Schiedam Centrum – Rotterdam Centraal – Dordrecht – Roosendaal – Vlissingen
2400	Intercity (NS)	(Lelystad Centrum – Almere Buiten – Almere Centrum – Amsterdam Zuid – )Schiphol Airport – Leiden Centraal – Den Haag HS – Delft – Schiedam Centrum – Rotterdam Centraal – Dordrecht
2800	Intercity (NS)	Rotterdam Centraal – Gouda – Utrecht Centraal
3200	Intercity (NS)	Arnhem Centraal – Ede-Wageningen – Utrecht Centraal – Amsterdam Zuid – Schiphol Airport – Leiden Centraal – Den Haag HS – Delft – Schiedam Centrum – Rotterdam Centraal
3700	Intercity (NS)	Dordrecht – Rotterdam Centraal – Schiedam Centrum – Delft – Den Haag HS – Leiden Centraal – Schiphol Airport – Amsterdam Zuid – Utrecht Centraal – 's-Hertogenbosch – Eindhoven Centraal – Helmond – Venlo
4000	Sprinter (NS)	Uitgeest – Zaandam – Amsterdam Centraal – Breukelen – Woerden – Gouda – Rotterdam Centraal
5000	Sprinter (NS)	Den Haag Centraal – Den Haag HS – Delft – Schiedam Centrum – Rotterdam Centraal – Rotterdam Blaak – Rotterdam Lombardijen – Dordrecht
5100	Sprinter (NS)	Den Haag Centraal – Den Haag HS – Delft – Schiedam Centrum – Rotterdam Centraal – Rotterdam Blaak – Rotterdam Lombardijen – Dordrecht
5200	Sprinter (NS)	Rotterdam Centraal – Rotterdam Blaak – Rotterdam Lombardijen – Dordrecht
21400	Intercity (NS)	Rotterdam Centraal – Eindhoven Centraal; Tilburg – 's-Hertogenbosch; Eindhoven Centraal – Utrecht Centraal

== Metro services ==
Rotterdam Centraal
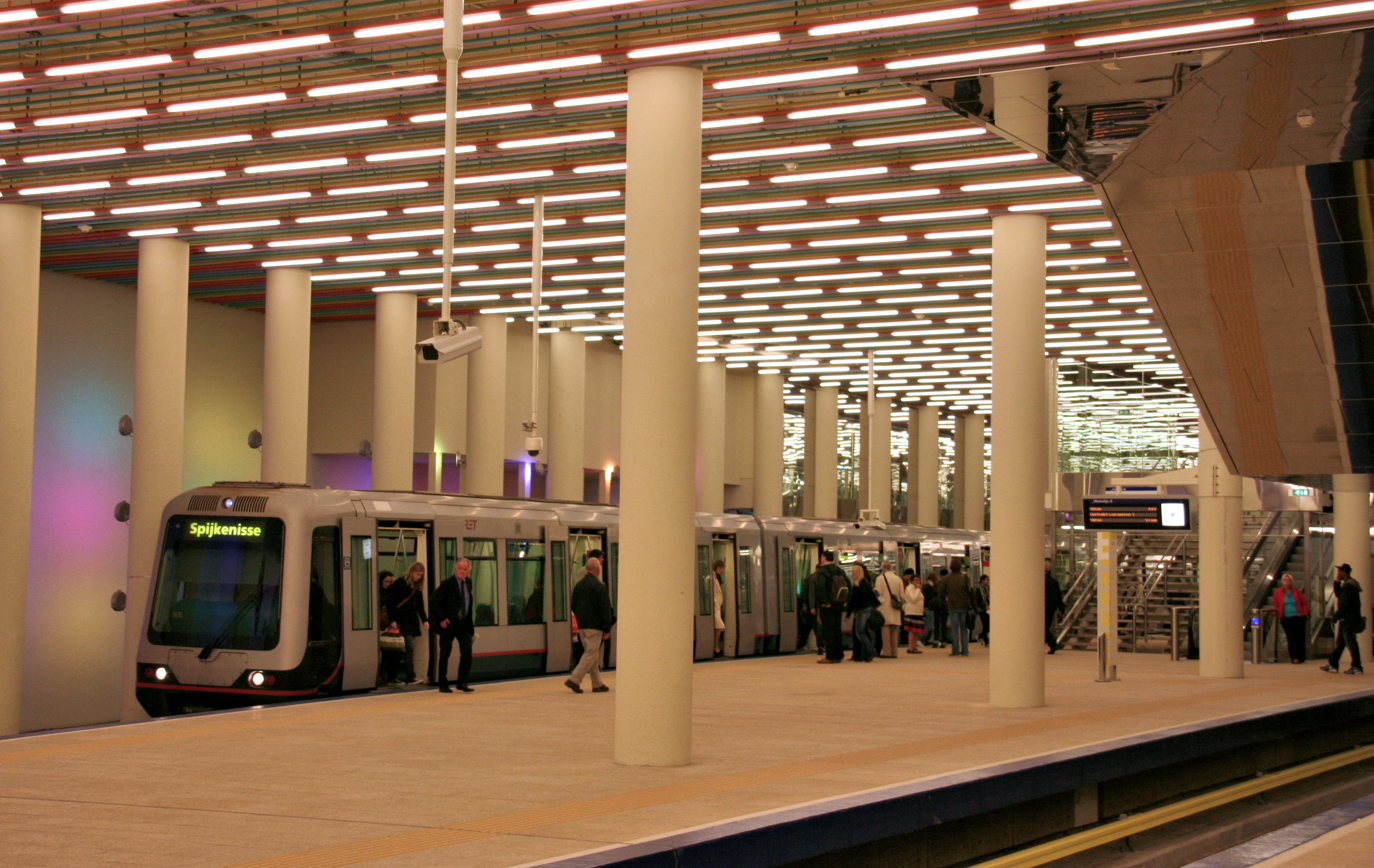

General information
- System: Rotterdam Metro station
- Owner: RET
- Tracks: 2

Construction
- Structure type: Underground

Services
Preceding station	Rotterdam Metro	Following station
Stadhuis towards De Akkers	Line D	Terminus
Stadhuis towards Slinge	Line E	Blijdorp towards Den Haag Centraal
Location

Rotterdam Centraal currently serves as a terminus for metro line D, while line E trains continue further north to Voorburg and The Hague, sharing the section between Rotterdam Centraal and Slinge with line D. The trains are operated by RET.

Line	Operator	Route	Notes
D	RET	Rotterdam Centraal – Stadhuis – Beurs – Leuvehaven – Wilhelminaplein – Rijnhaven – Maashaven – Zuidplein – Slinge – Rhoon – Poortugaal – Tussenwater – Hoogvliet – Zalmplaat – Spijkenisse Centrum – Heemraadlaan – De Akkers	
E	RET	Den Haag Centraal – Laan van NOI – Voorburg 't Loo – Leidschendam-Voorburg – Forepark – Leidschenveen – Nootdorp – Pijnacker Centrum – Pijnacker Zuid – Berkel Westpolder – Rodenrijs – Meijersplein/Airport – Melanchthonweg – Blijdorp – Rotterdam Centraal – Stadhuis – Beurs – Leuvehaven – Wilhelminaplein – Rijnhaven – Maashaven – Zuidplein – Slinge	Part of RandstadRail

== Tram services ==
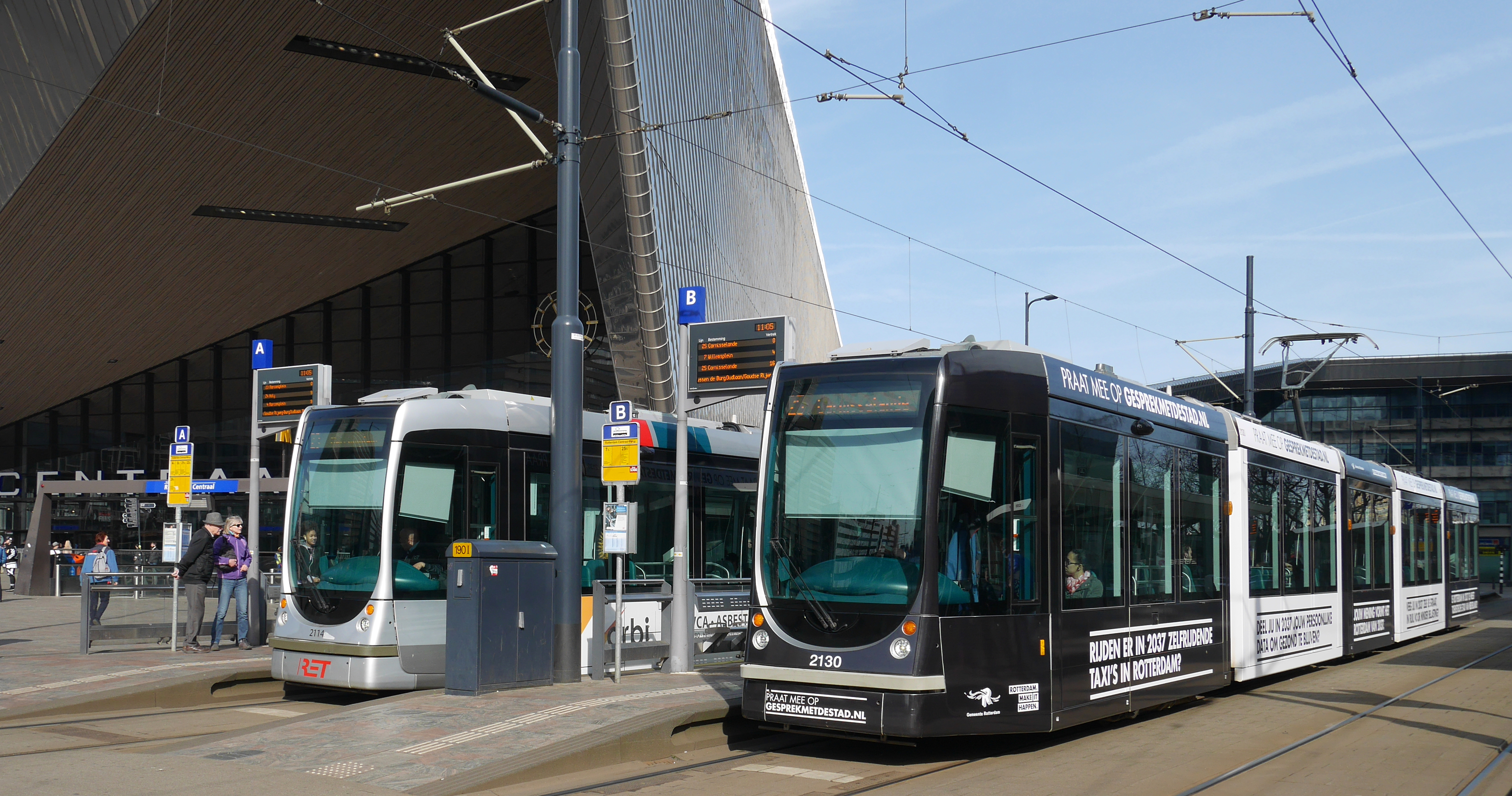
Tram stop at Rotterdam Centraal station

The station is served by almost all lines in the Rotterdam tramway network (1, 3, 4, 5, 6, 7, 8, 11 and 12) and are operated by RET.

The routes of the trams are as follows:

Line	Route	Frequency	Notes
1	De Esch - Woudestein - Oostplein Metro station - Station Blaak - Beurs Metro station - Stadhuis Metro station - Weena - Centraal Station - Middellandstraat - Nieuwe Westen - Marconiplein Metro station - Station Schiedam Centrum - Schiedam, Parkweg - Station Schiedam Nieuwland - Schiedam, Bachplein - Vlaardingen, Holy	Outside Summer and Christmas holidays: 4x/hour, but only 3x/hour on weekends; Summer and Christmas holidays: 3x/hour	
3	Beverwaard - Keizerswaard - IJsselmonde - De Kuip (Stadion Feijenoord) - Kop van Zuid - Wilhelminaplein Metro station - Leuvehaven Metro station - Beurs Metro station - Stadhuis Metro station - Weena - Centraal Station	Outside Summer and Christmas holidays: 9x/hour, but only 6x/hour on weekends and only 4x/hour on evenings; Summer and Christmas holidays: 6x/hour, but only 4x/hour on evenings	
4	Marconiplein Metro station - Delfshaven - Delfshaven Metro station - Eendrachtsplein Metro station - Centraal Station - Weena - Oude Noorden - Station Noord - Hillegersberg - Molenlaan	Outside Summer and Christmas holidays: 3x/hour; Summer and Christmas holidays: 3x/hour	
5	Barendrecht, Carnisselande - Zuidwijk - Randweg - Laan op Zuid - Wilhelminaplein Metro station - Leuvehaven Metro station - Beurs Metro station - Lijnbaan - Centraal Station	Outside Summer and Christmas holidays: 9x/hour, but only 6x/hour on weekends and only 4x/hour on evenings; Summer and Christmas holidays: 6x/hour, but only 4x/hour on evenings	
6	Heemsraadsplein - Eendrachtsplein Metro station - Centraal Station - Weena - Oude Noorden - Station Noord - Kleiweg	Outside Summer and Christmas holidays: 3x/hour; Summer and Christmas holidays: 3x/hour	
7	Marconiplein Metro station - Nieuwe Westen - Middellandstraat - Centraal Station - Weena - Crooswijk - Kralingen - Voorschoterlaan Metro station - Woudestein - Erasmus Universiteit	Outside holidays: 6x/hour, but only 4x/hour on weekends and only 3x/hour on evenings; Holidays: 4x/hour, but only 3x/hour on evenings	
8	Spangen - Marconiplein Metro station - Delfshaven - Delfshaven Metro station - Euromast/Erasmus MC - Leuvehaven Metro station - Beurs Metro station - Lijnbaan - Centraal Station - Weena - Schiekade - Sint Franciscus Gasthuis - Melanchtonweg Metro station - Schiebroek	Outside holidays: 6x/hour, but only 4x/hour on weekends and only 3x/hour on evenings; Holidays: 4x/hour, but only 3x/hour on evenings	
11	De Esch - Woudestein - Oostplein Metro station - Station Blaak - Beurs Metro station - Stadhuis Metro station - Weena - Centraal Station - Middellandstraat - Nieuwe Westen - Marconiplein Metro station - Station Schiedam Centrum - Schiedam, Parkweg - Station Schiedam Nieuwland - Schiedam, Bachplein - Schiedam, Woudhoek	Outside Summer and Christmas holidays: 4x/hour, but only 3x/hour on weekends; Summer and Christmas holidays: 4x/hour, but only 3x/hour on evenings	Not on evenings and Sunday mornings
12	Centraal Station - Weena - Stadhuis Metro station - Beurs Metro station - Leuvehaven Metro station - Wilhelminaplein Metro station - Kop van Zuid - De Kuip (Stadion Feijenoord)		Special tram line that operates only at football matches and concerts at De Kuip

== Bus services ==
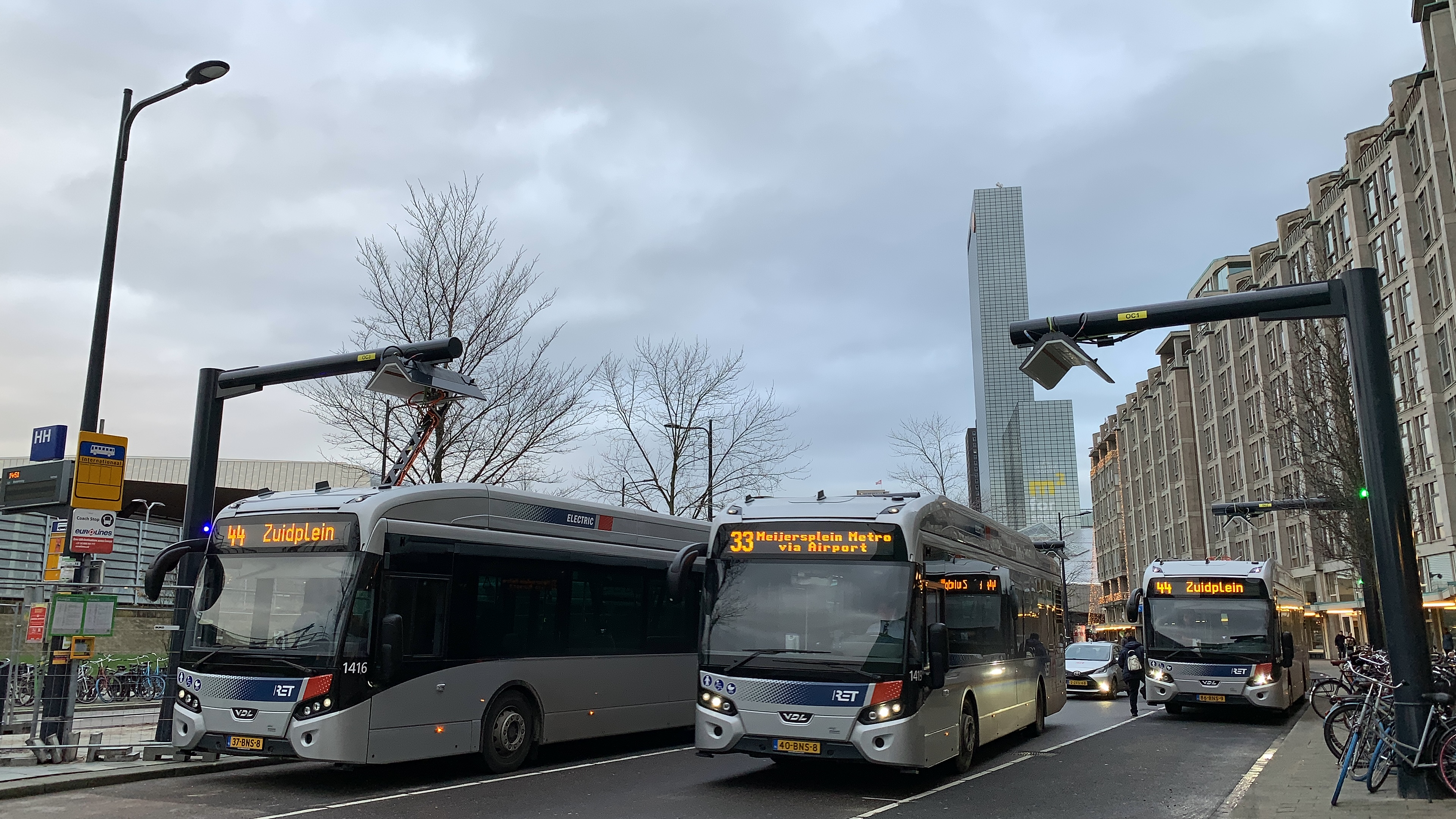
Bus station outside Rotterdam Centraal station

The following bus lines stop at Rotterdam Central Station:

- 33 Rotterdam Centraal - Blijdorp Zoo - Overschie - Rotterdam-The Hague Airport - Meijersplein Metro
- 38 Crooswijk - Rotterdam Centraal - Oud-Mathenesse - Schiedam Centrum
- 40 Rotterdam Centraal - Blijdorp Zoo - Overschie - Delft University - Delft
- 44 Rotterdam Centraal - Erasmus University Medical Center - Carnisse - Zuidplein
- FlixBus

There are also 13 nightbus lines operating every Friday and Saturday.

== Amenities ==
The new travelers passage includes two supermarkets, a HEMA, a range of take-away food options, and two branches of Starbucks. There is also a "station living room". The south side features an underground bicycle parking for over 5,000 bicycles. Both the north and the south side have taxi stops. Under the Kruisplein an underground parking garage has been built with a water storage facility on top; This garage is accessible from the south (=west-east) tube of the Weena Tunnel and will be connected to the parking garage under the Schouwburgplein.

== Gallery ==
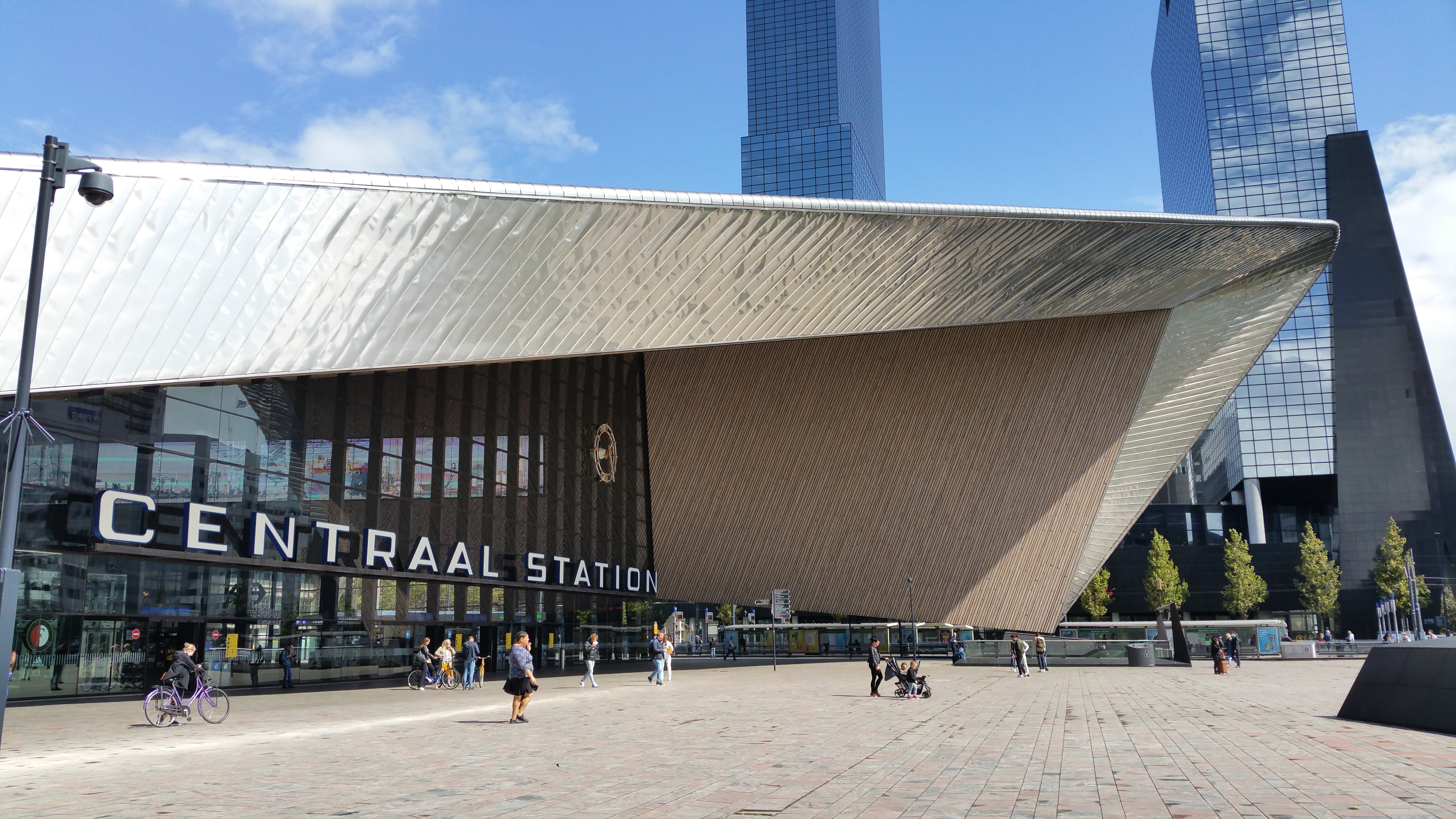
Rotterdam Centraal station facade

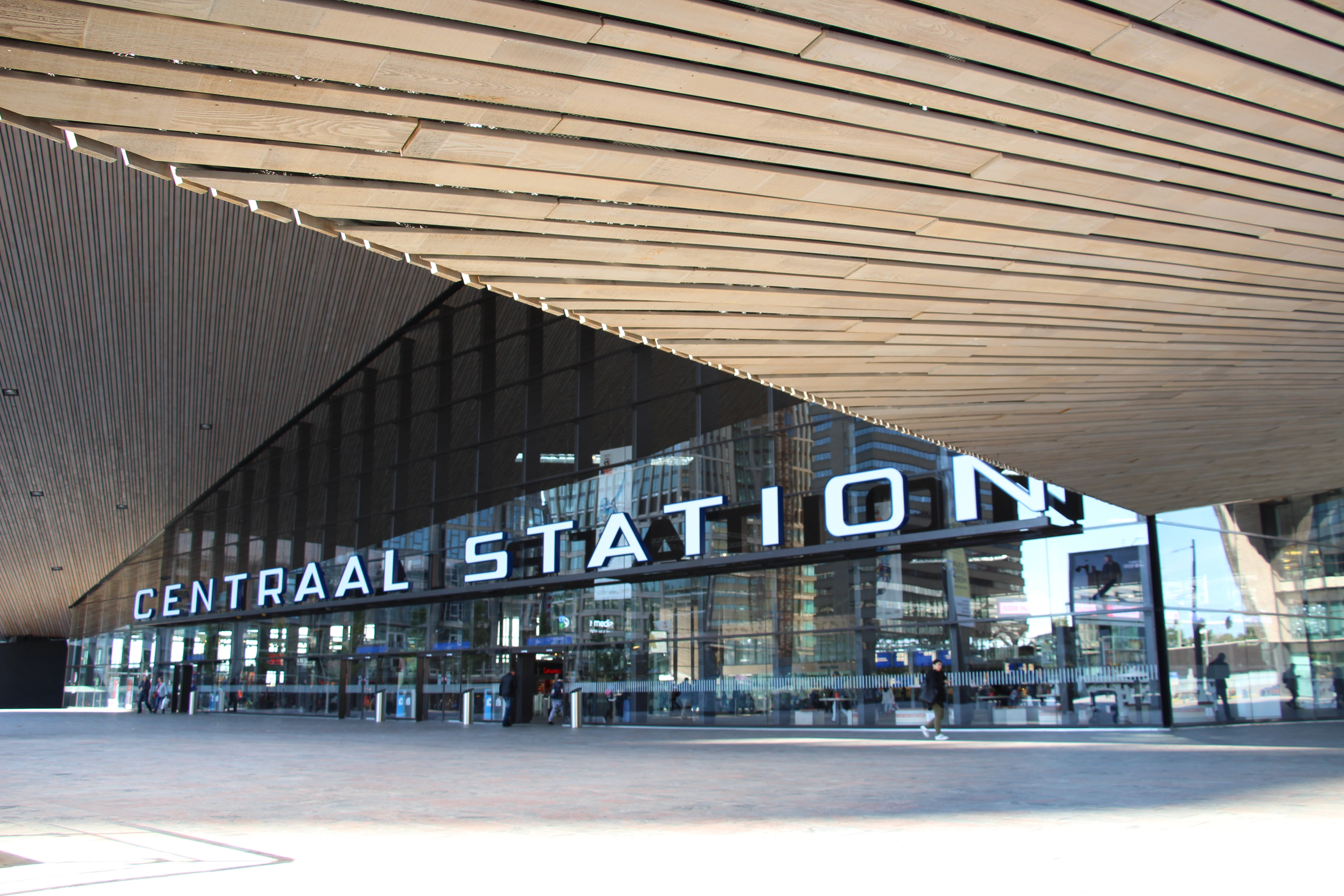
Main entrance of the station

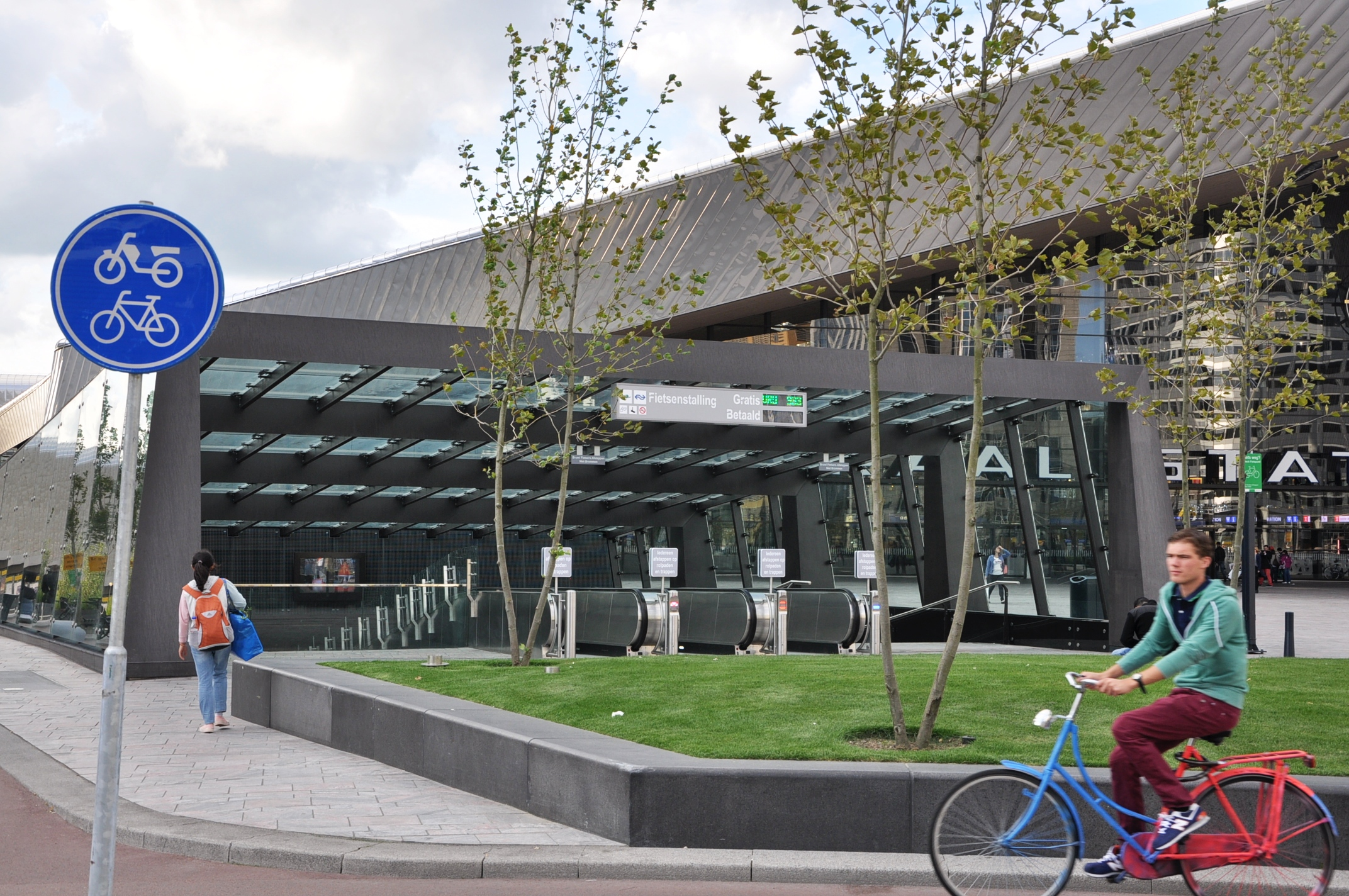
Access to underground bicycle parking

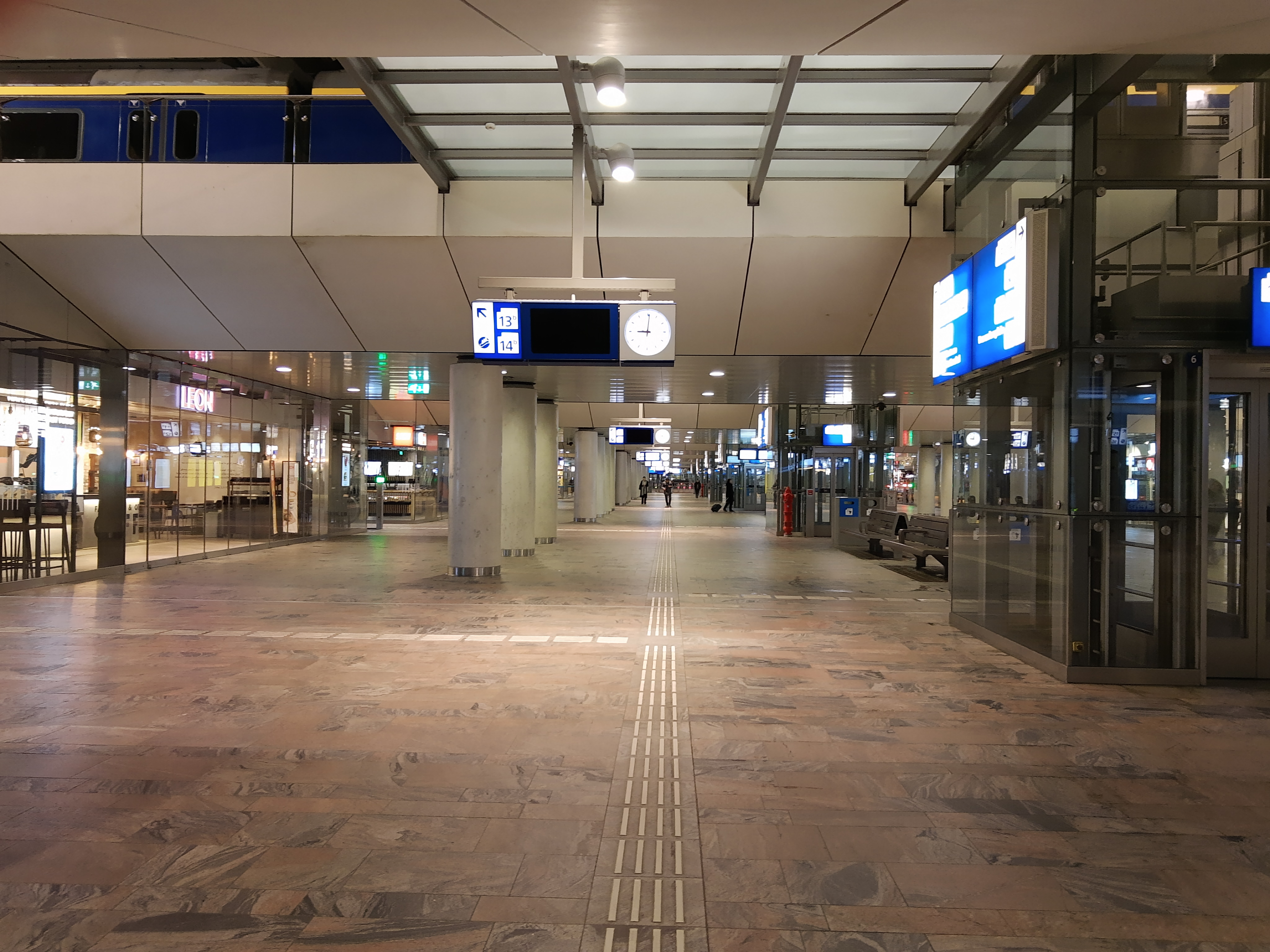
Concourse to the platforms

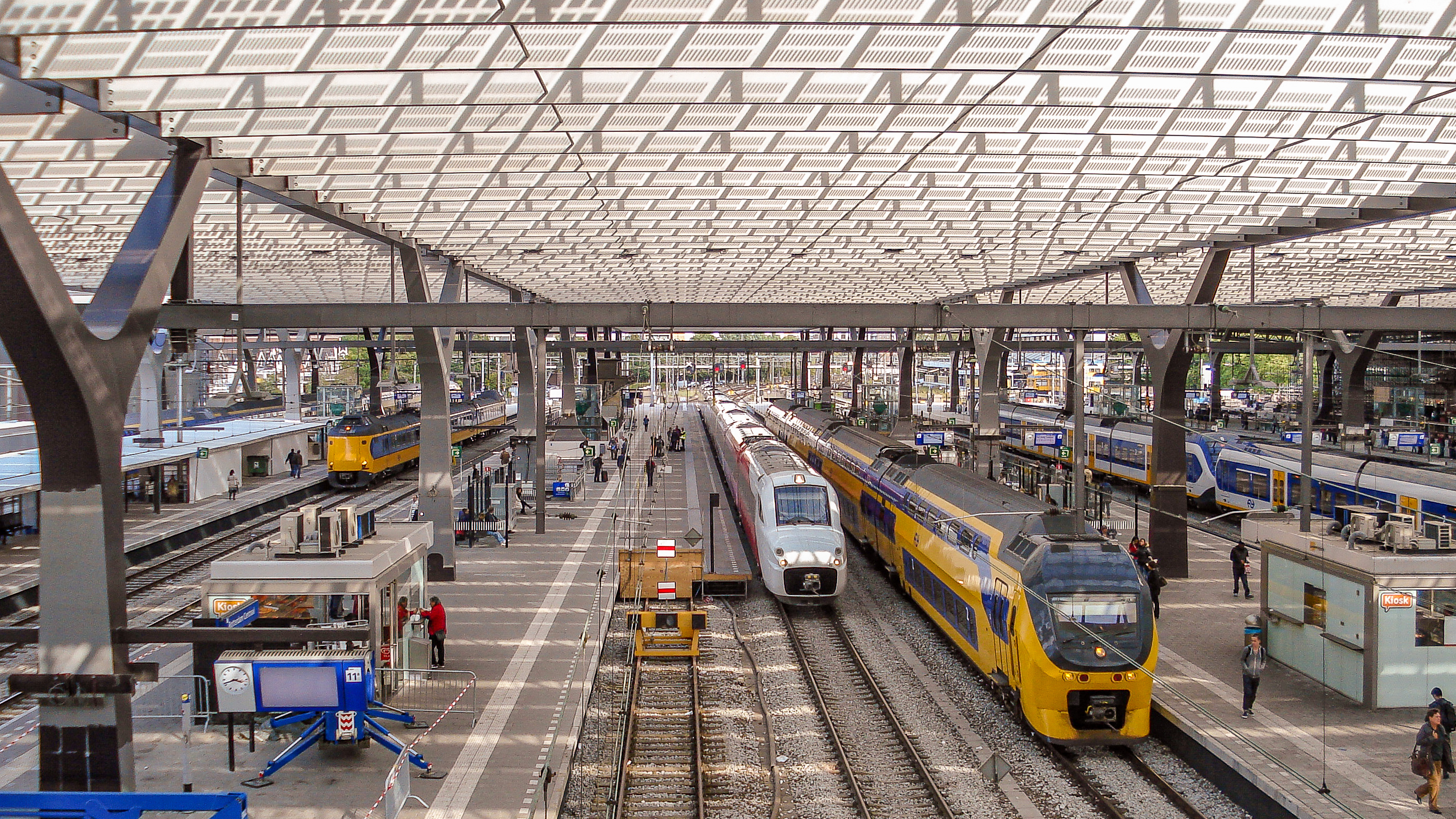
Train platforms in Rotterdam Centraal Station

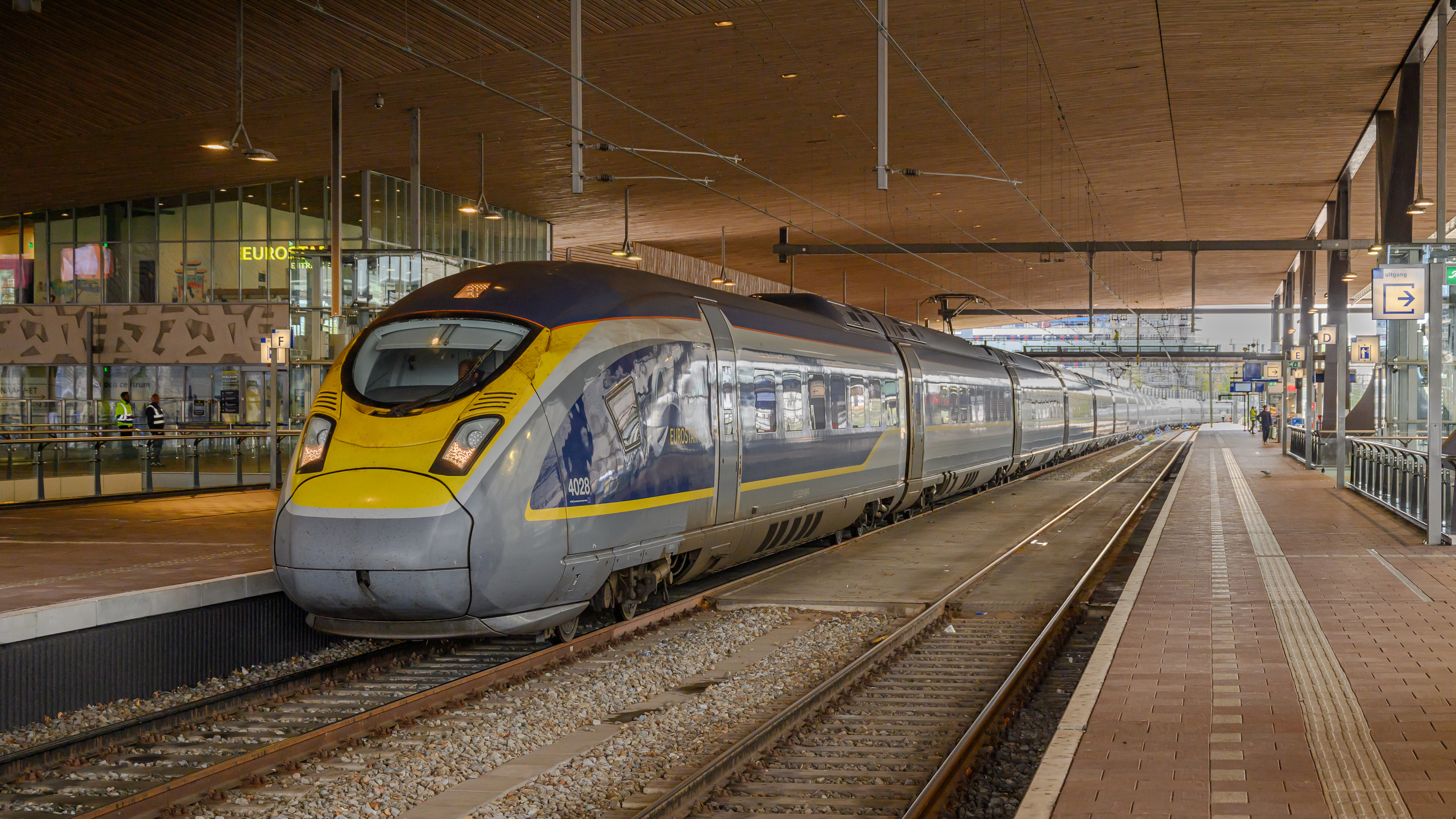
Eurostar train at Rotterdam Centraal Station

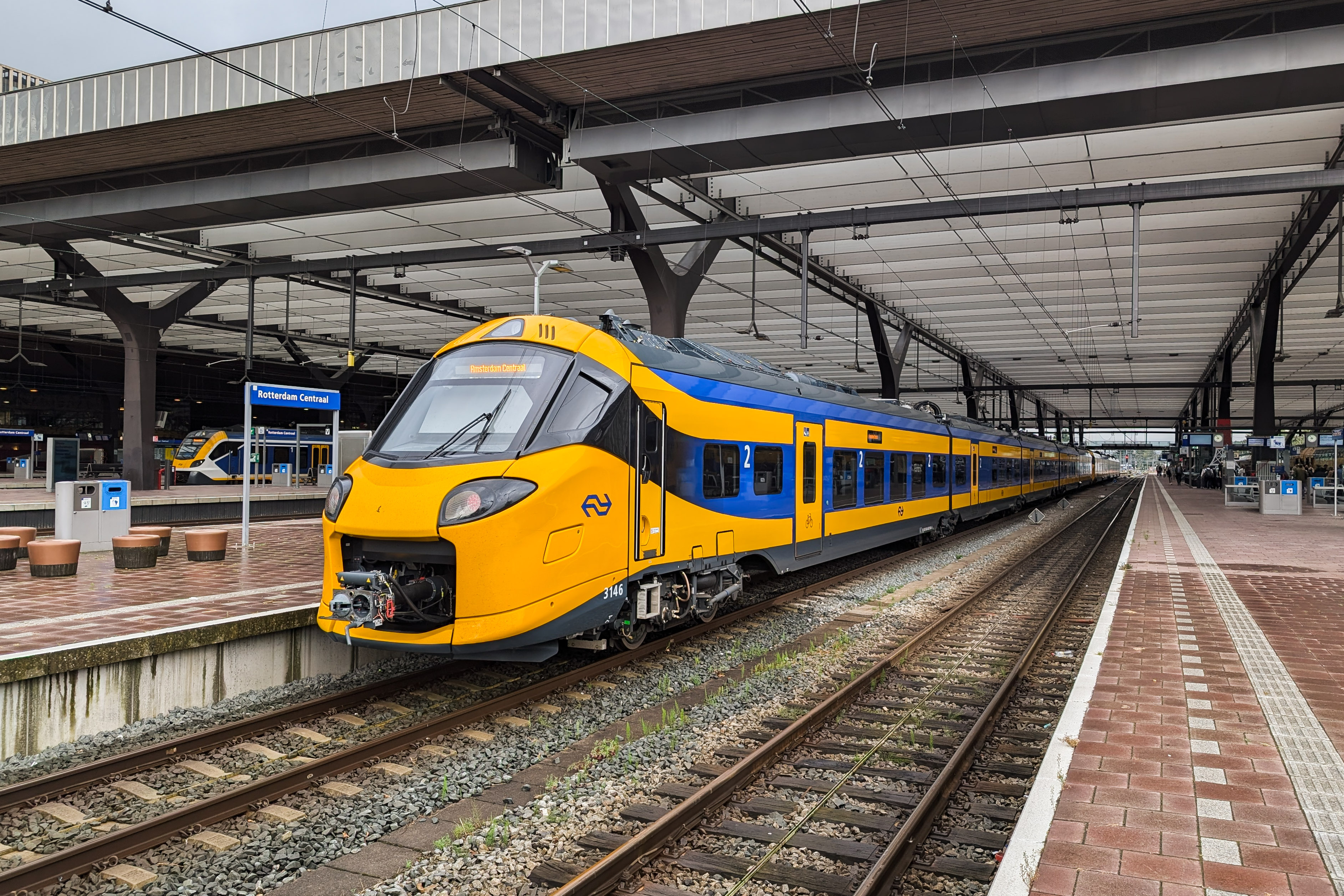
NS Intercity ICNG train at Rotterdam Centraal Station

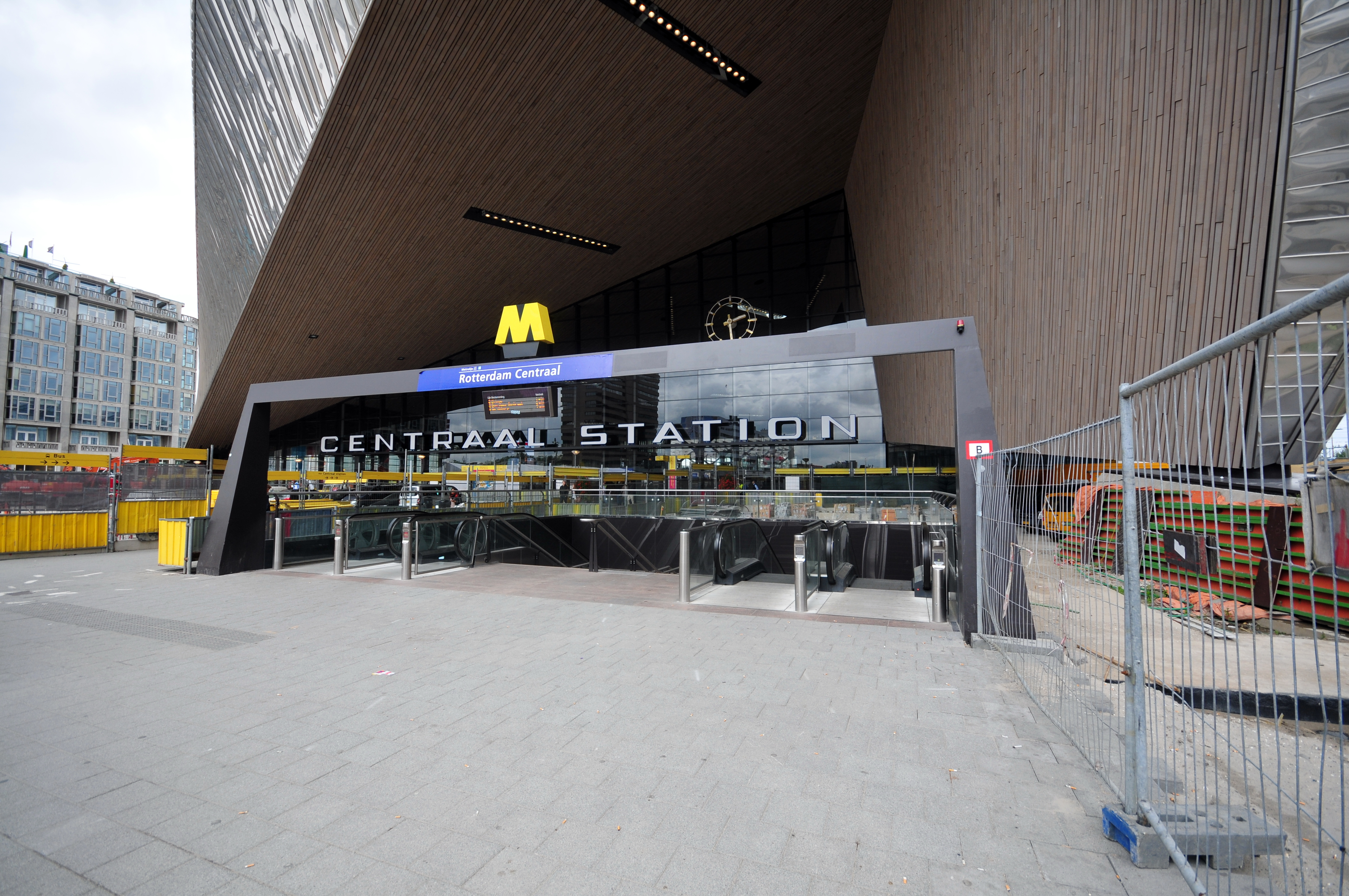
Access to the metro station

== See also ==
- Nederlandse Spoorwegen
- RandstadRail
