= Peter Jansen =

Peter Jansen may refer to:

- Peter Jansen (art educator) (born 1938), Dutch artist
- Peter Jansen (politician) (1852–1923), American sheep rancher and Nebraska state representative and senator
- Peter Jansen (rower), former New Zealand rower
