= PolyVision Corporation =

Polyvision Corporation
- Formerly: Display Technology, Inc., Information Display Technology, Inc.
- Type: Private
- Industry: Manufacturing
- Founded: 1954; 72 years ago
- Headquarters: Johns Creek, Georgia, United States
- Areas served: North America, EMEA (Europe, Middle East, Africa), APAC (Asia-Pacific)
- Products: CeramicSteel Panels, Architectural Cladding, Writing Surface Materials
- Number of employees: 200 (2014)
- Website: polyvision.com

Polyvision Corporation is an American company that manufactures porcelain enameled steel, known as CeramicSteel, surfaces for applications such as whiteboards, chalkboards, architectural surfaces and panels, and infrastructure projects. Headquartered in Georgia, Polyvision was acquired by private equity company Industrial Opportunity Partners in February 2020.

Polyvision has production facilities in Okmulgee, Oklahoma, New Philadelphia, Ohio, and Genk, Belgium, with their Okmulgee facility being one of the area's major employers.

== History ==
The company was founded in 1954 under the name Information Display Technology, Inc. and began operating under the name Polyvision in May 1995.

In 1998, Polyvision purchased Alliance International Group, a manufacturer of CeramicSteel products used in visual displays and writing surfaces, for about $75 million. The following year, Polyvision acquired Nelson Adams in May 1999.

In January 2000, Polyvision purchased both American Chalkboard and Peninsular Slate.

Polyvision became a subsidiary of Steelcase in August 2001. In 2012, it was announced that Polyvision’s educational technology products would become part of the Steelcase Education Solutions group.

Polyvision was divested by Steelcase and acquired by Industrial Opportunities Partners in February 2020.

Polyvision announced its acquisition of Marsh Industries in August of 2020.

== Projects ==
Polyvision has created surfaces for many public art installations, only a few of which include:

- The "Flat Earth" mural at the Dijkzigt Metro Station in Rotterdam, artwork by Peter Jansen
- Artwork at Telok Ayer MRT station in Singapore, art by Lim Shing Ee and Kazunori Takeishi
- Dublin's Last Supper by John Byrne in 2003

== Recognition ==
Some of PolyVision's products have won awards at the NeoCon World's Trade Fair:

- 2005 MAX Award winner for the Walk-and-Talk Interactive Panel and Cordless Lectern
- 2010 Best in Tech by Scholastic

Polyvision's Genk facility was the first European CeramicSteel manufacturer to earn a Cradle-to-Cradle certification for its environmentally sustainable practices.
