= Dijkzigt metro station =

Metro station in Rotterdam, Netherlands

Dijkzigt
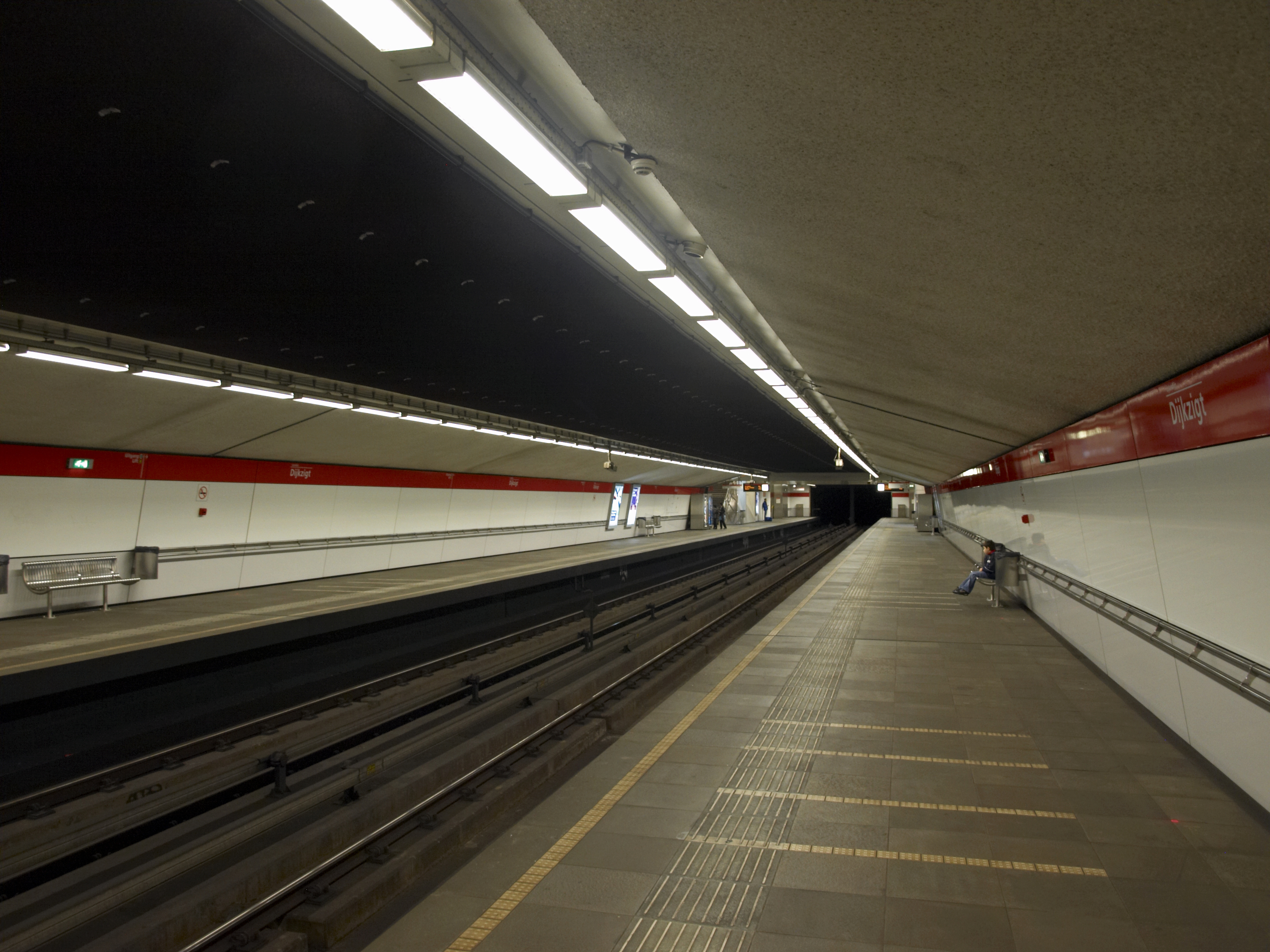

General information
- Coordinates: 51°54′44″N 4°27′58″E
- System: Rotterdam Metro station
- Owner: RET
- Platforms: Side platforms
- Tracks: 2

Construction
- Structure type: Underground

History
- Opened: 1982

Services
Preceding station	Rotterdam Metro	Following station
Coolhaven towards Vlaardingen West	Line A Not on evenings and early weekend mornings	Eendrachtsplein towards Binnenhof
Coolhaven towards Hoek van Holland Strand	Line B	Eendrachtsplein towards Nesselande
Coolhaven towards De Akkers	Line C	Eendrachtsplein towards De Terp
Location

Dijkzigt is an underground subway station in the city of Rotterdam, and is served by Rotterdam Metro lines A, B, and C. The station is located next to the Erasmus MC (the biggest hospital in the Netherlands) and the Erasmus University. Dijkzigt station was opened on 10 May 1982 as a station of the East-West Line (or Caland line). The station is located underneath the Rochussenstraat and there is interchange with buslines 44 and 46.

The station hall houses a small RET office and a few shops.

== Public Art ==
In 2015, artist Peter Jansen and PolyVision were commissioned to create the "Flat Earth" mural for the Dijkzigt Metro Station. "Flat Earth" consists of 1,250 digital prints of photographs taken by Jansen during the 20 years he spent traveling around the world. The images are arranged in a panorama-like manner. The mural was unveiled in April 2016.
