= Coolhaven metro station =

Metro station in Rotterdam, Netherlands

Coolhaven
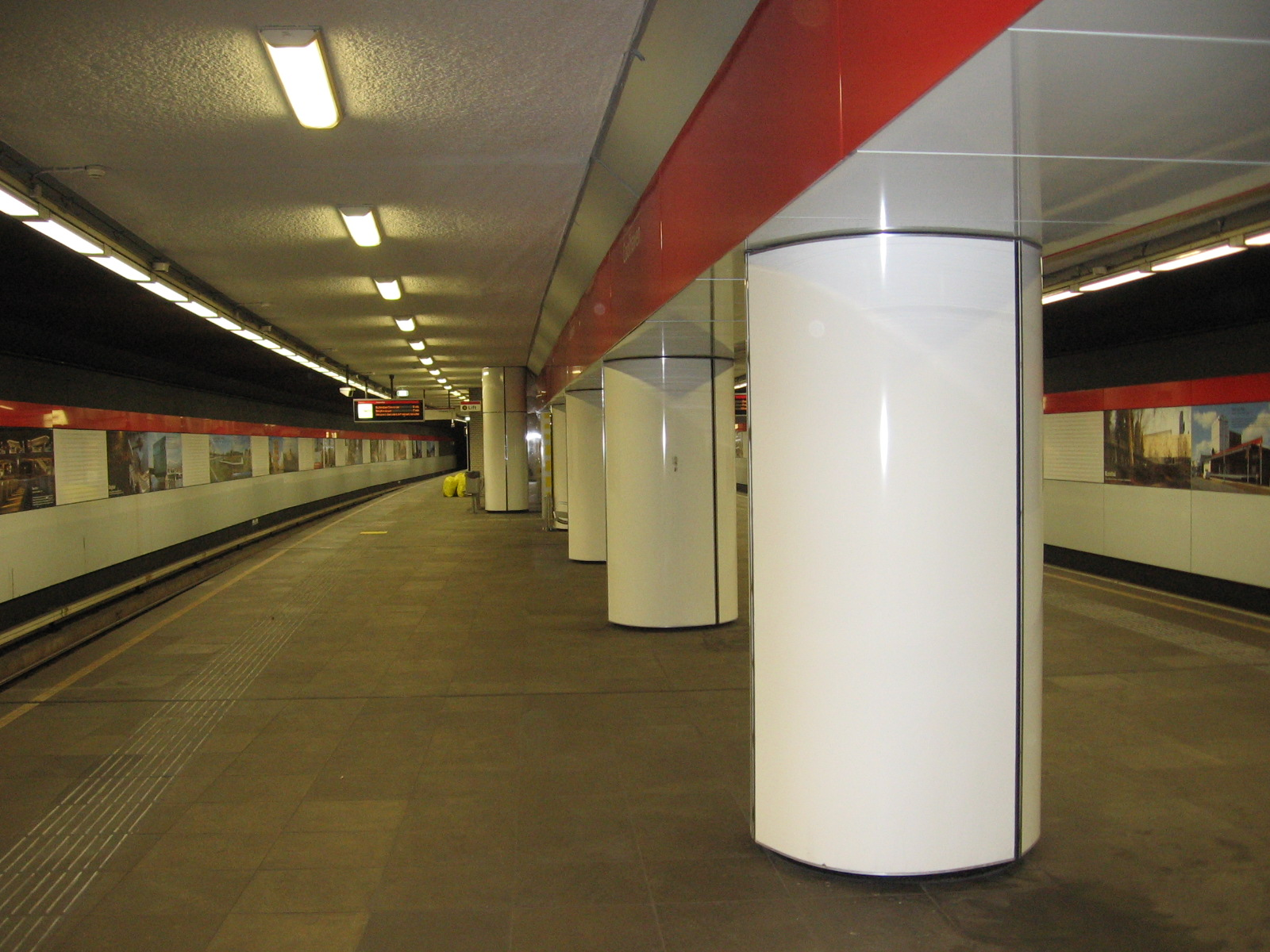

General information
- Coordinates: 51°54′35″N 4°27′29″E
- System: Rotterdam Metro station
- Owner: RET
- Platforms: Island platform
- Tracks: 2

Construction
- Structure type: Underground

History
- Opened: 1982

Services
Preceding station	Rotterdam Metro	Following station
Delfshaven towards Vlaardingen West	Line A Not on evenings and early weekend mornings	Dijkzigt towards Binnenhof
Delfshaven towards Hoek van Holland Strand	Line B	Dijkzigt towards Nesselande
Delfshaven towards De Akkers	Line C	Dijkzigt towards De Terp
Location

Coolhaven is an underground subway station in the Dutch city of Rotterdam. It is served by Rotterdam Metro lines A, B, and C. The station, with one island platform, opened on 10 May 1982 as the western terminus of the East-West Line (also formerly called Calandlijn). Coolhaven was the terminus until 1986, when the line was extended to Marconiplein. The station is named for the adjacent Coolhaven harbour basin. It also has images of Rotterdam along its platforms.

At the end of 2006 the station was renovated. The walls now show pictures of Rotterdam and the pillars in the middle of the station were repainted.
