= Leuvehaven metro station =

Metro station in Rotterdam, the Netherlands

Leuvehaven
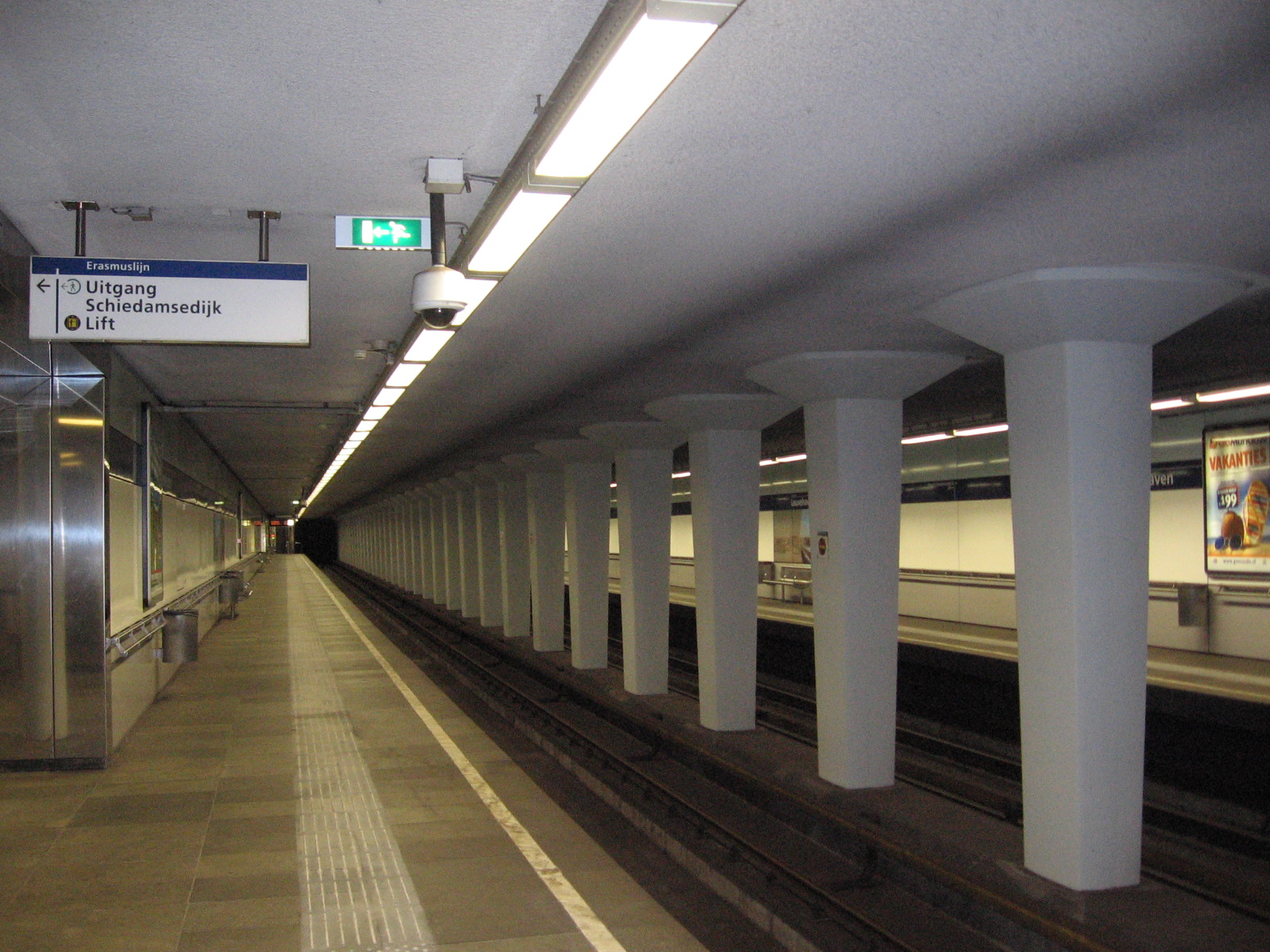

General information
- Coordinates: 51°54′50″N 4°28′58″E
- System: Rotterdam Metro station
- Owner: RET
- Tracks: 2

Construction
- Structure type: Underground

History
- Opened: 1968

Services
Preceding station	Rotterdam Metro	Following station
Wilhelminaplein towards De Akkers	Line D	Beurs towards Rotterdam Centraal
Wilhelminaplein towards Slinge	Line E	Beurs towards Den Haag Centraal
Location

Leuvehaven is an underground subway station in the city of Rotterdam. It is part of Rotterdam Metro lines D and E. The station opened on 9 February 1968, the same date that the North-South Line (also formerly called Erasmus line), of which it is a part, was opened.

The station is located in the southern part of the center of Rotterdam, underneath the Schiedamsedijk, and near the northern end of the Erasmus Bridge.
