= Rotterdam Noord railway station =

Railway station in Rotterdam, the Netherlands

Rotterdam Noord
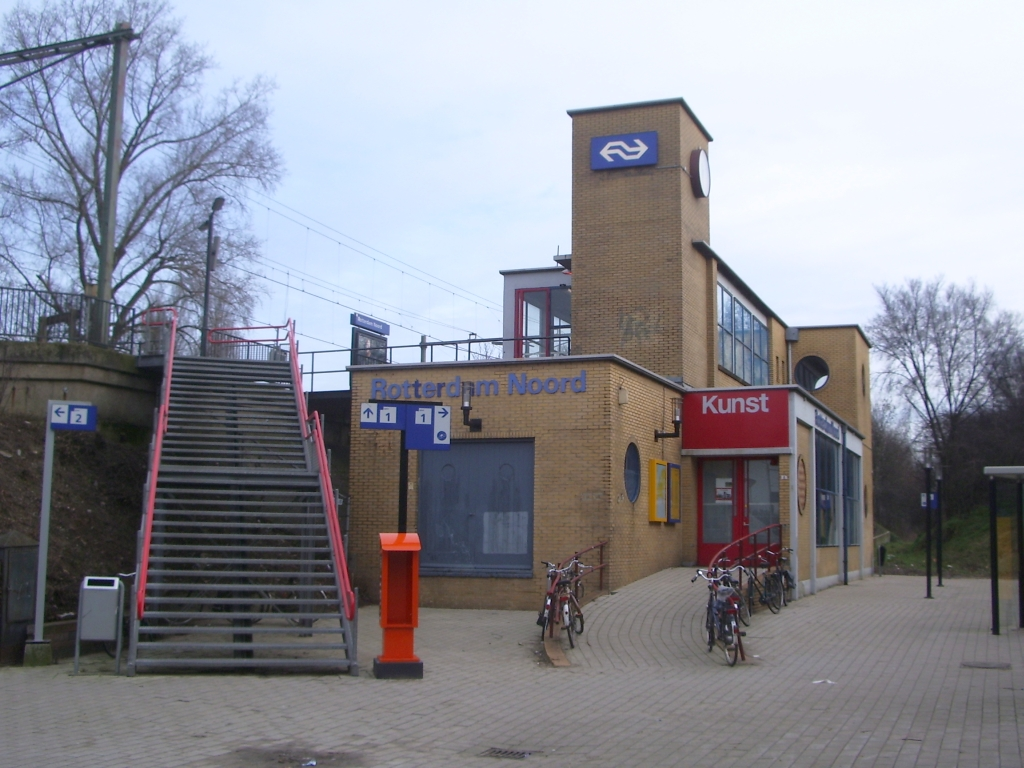
- Rotterdam Noord

General information
- Location: Netherlands
- Coordinates: 51°56′32″N 4°28′53″E
- Line: Utrecht–Rotterdam railway
- Platforms: 2

Other information
- Station code: Rtn

History
- Opened: 4 October 1953

Services
Preceding station	Nederlandse Spoorwegen	Following station
Rotterdam Centraal Terminus	NS Sprinter 4000	Rotterdam Alexander towards Uitgeest
Location
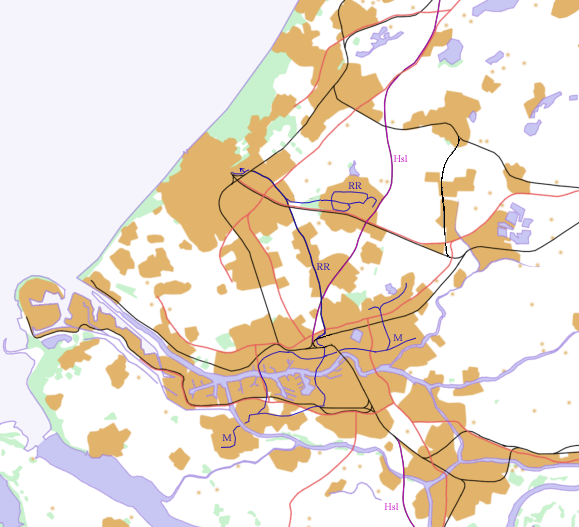
- Location within Southwest Randstad Location within Netherlands

Rotterdam Noord is a railway station in the city of Rotterdam in the Netherlands, located on the Utrecht–Rotterdam railway. It sits at the border between the two Rotterdam boroughs Noord and Hillegersberg-Schiebroek.

== History ==
In 1899, the railway station Hillegersberg was opened on the new connecting line (Ceintuurbaan) between the railway from Rotterdam Delftsche Poort to Leiden, and the railway from Rotterdam Maasstation to Utrecht. In 1953 the railway from Rotterdam to Utrecht was rerouted to the new Rotterdam Centraal station through Hillegersberg. A new station building was constructed, and the station was renamed Rotterdam Noord. Rotterdam Noord is designed by architect Sybold van Ravesteyn who has also designed the stations Rotterdam Centraal, Eindhoven, and many other railway stations and buildings in the Netherlands. The station was opened on 4 October 1953.

== The building ==
The platform leading to Utrecht is connected to a building, which used to house an NS ticket office. After the closure of the office, tickets could only be bought at a ticket machine. In 2007 the building was repurposed to house art expositions.

In 2017 café ‘t Viaduct, located next to the stairs leading up to the platform towards Rotterdam Centraal, moved into the station building. The former building of the café had to be demolished to make way for renovations of the station that finished in 2021.

== Train services ==
Rotterdam Noord is a station for local trains (Stoptrein and Sprinter in Dutch).

The following services currently call at Rotterdam Noord.

- 2x per hour local service (sprinter) Uitgeest - Amsterdam - Woerden - Rotterdam

== Tram and bus services ==
Rotterdam Noord is a stop for the following Rotterdam tram and bus lines on the RET network.

Tram Service	Route
4	Molenlaan - Heemraadsplein
6	Kleiweg - Heemraadsplein

Bus Service	Operator	Route
174	RET	Rotterdam Noord - Berkel Westpolder - Delft
