= Eendrachtsplein metro station =

Metro station in Rotterdam, the Netherlands

Eendrachtsplein
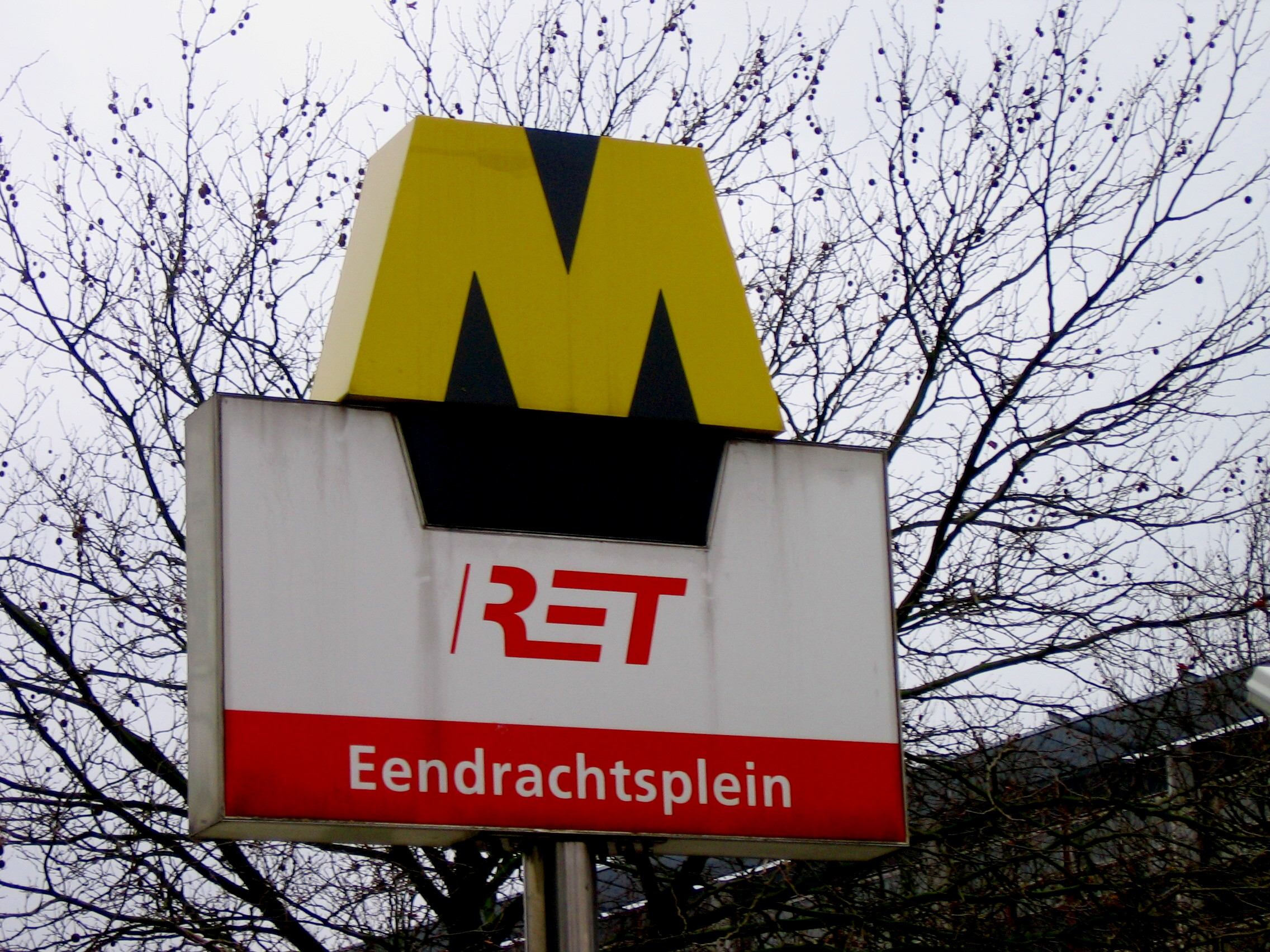

General information
- Coordinates: 51°54′59″N 4°28′25″E
- System: Rotterdam Metro station
- Owner: RET
- Tracks: 2

History
- Opened: 1982

Services
Preceding station	Rotterdam Metro	Following station
Dijkzigt towards Vlaardingen West	Line A Not on evenings and early weekend mornings	Beurs towards Binnenhof
Dijkzigt towards Hoek van Holland Strand	Line B	Beurs towards Nesselande
Dijkzigt towards De Akkers	Line C	Beurs towards De Terp
Location

Eendrachtsplein is an underground subway station in the center of Rotterdam. It is part of the Rotterdam Metro lines A, B, and C. The station is named after Eendracht Square (which is Eendrachtsplein in Dutch). It was opened on 10 May 1982. The station is located near several cultural hotspots, of which photos and location information are displayed on information panels on the station walls.

The station is between Dijkzigt and Beurs on the East-West Line (formerly Caland line). Nowadays lines A, B, and C serve the station.
