= Marconiplein metro station =

Metro station in Rotterdam, the Netherlands

Marconiplein
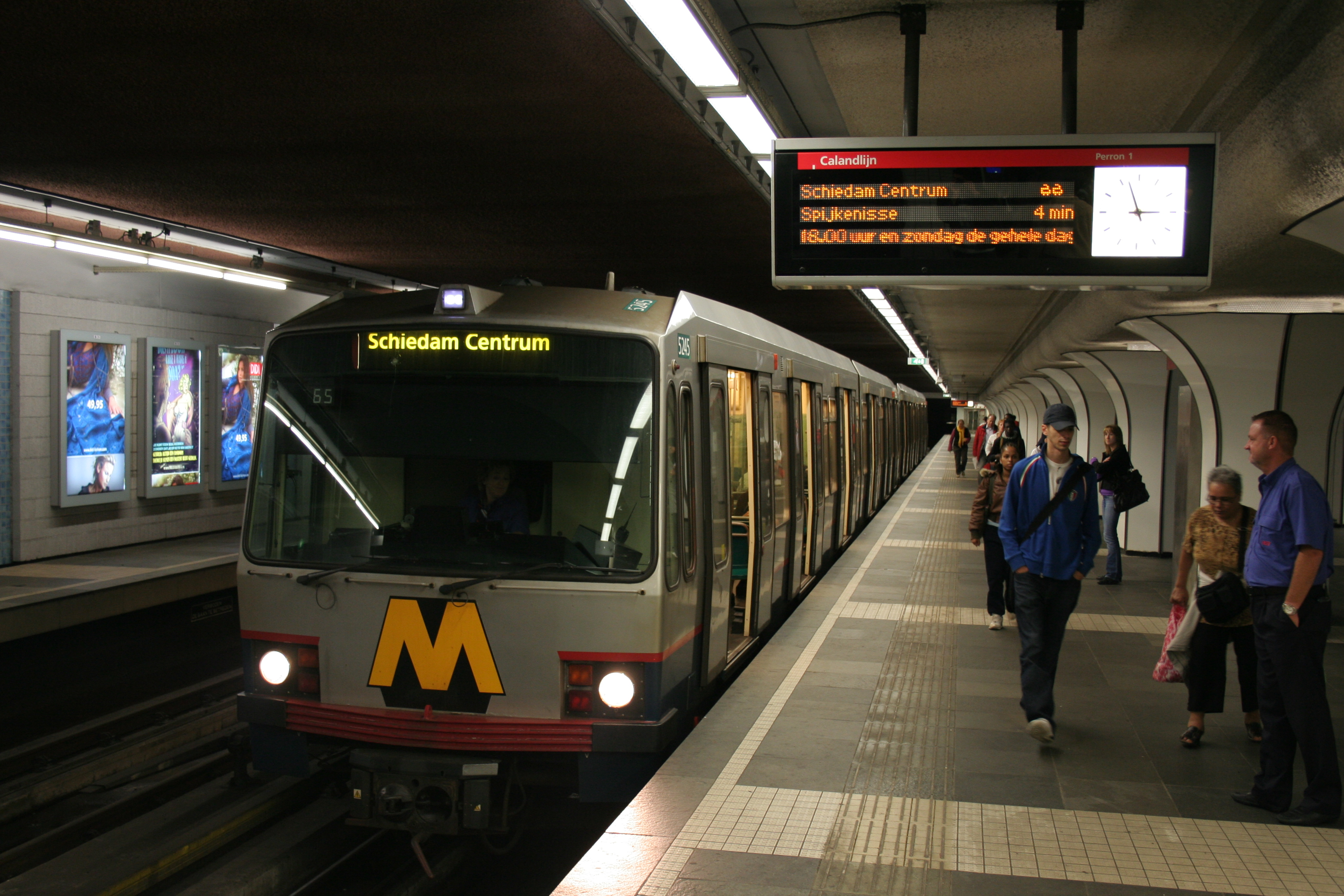

General information
- Coordinates: 51.9133°N 4.43275°E
- System: Rotterdam Metro station
- Owner: RET
- Platforms: Island platform
- Tracks: 3

Construction
- Structure type: Underground

History
- Opened: 1986

Services
Preceding station	Rotterdam Metro	Following station
Schiedam Centrum towards Vlaardingen West	Line A Not on evenings and early weekend mornings	Delfshaven towards Binnenhof
Schiedam Centrum towards Hoek van Holland Strand	Line B	Delfshaven towards Nesselande
Schiedam Centrum towards De Akkers	Line C	Delfshaven towards De Terp
Location

Marconiplein is an underground subway station in the Dutch city of Rotterdam, and is part of Rotterdam Metro lines A, B, and C. The station is part of the two station long extension of the East-West Line (also formerly called Caland line) and opened on 25 April 1986. This extension connected the new Marconiplein and Delfshaven stations with the line's former terminus Coolhaven.

Until 4 November 2002 Marconiplein station was the western terminus of the East-West Line. On that date, an extension towards Schiedam Centrum and Tussenwater stations opened.
