= Delfshaven metro station =

Metro station in Rotterdam, the Netherlands

Delfshaven
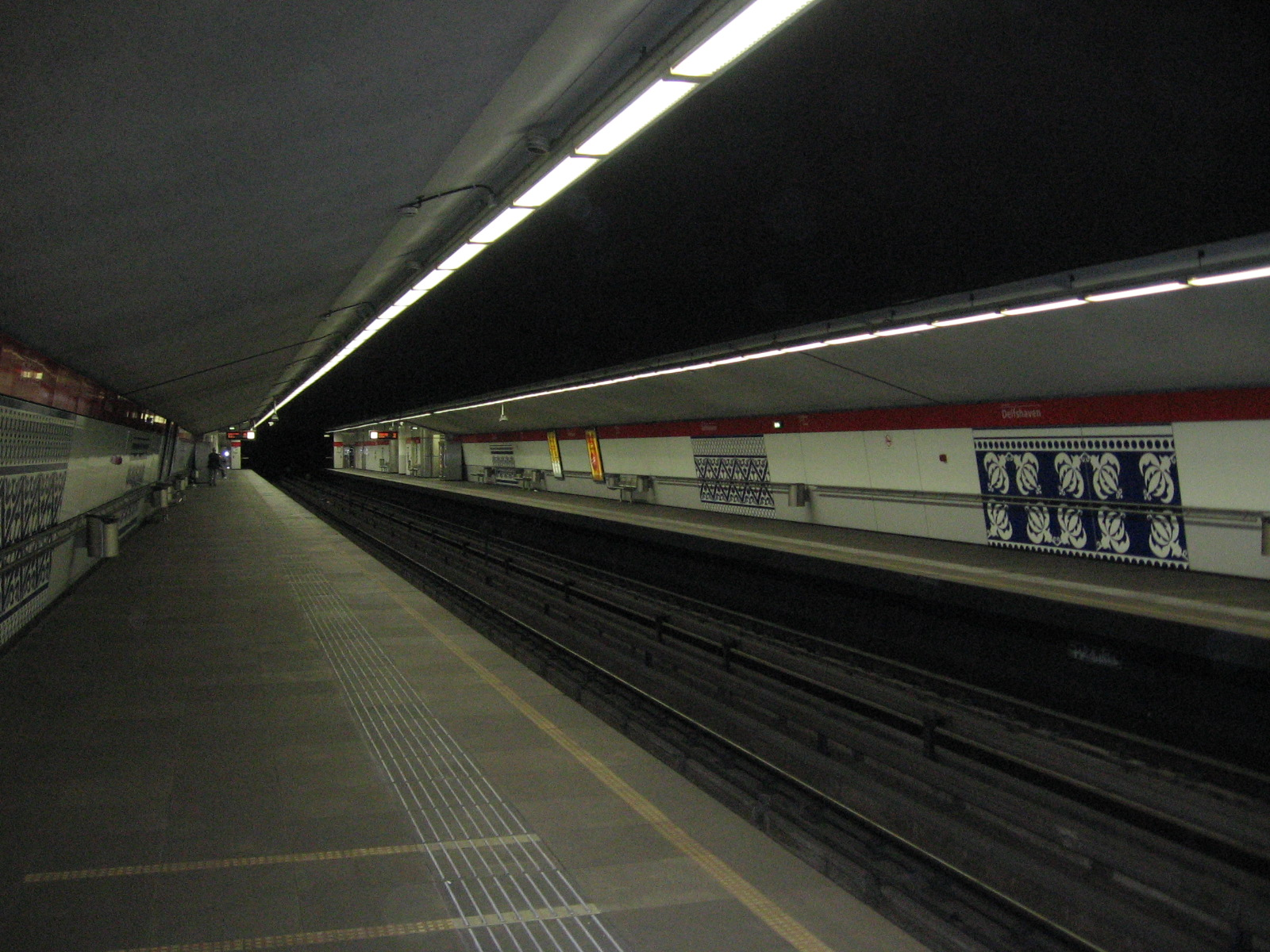

General information
- Coordinates: 51°54′36″N 4°26′44″E
- System: Rotterdam Metro station
- Owner: RET
- Tracks: 2

Construction
- Structure type: Underground

History
- Opened: 1986

Services
Preceding station	Rotterdam Metro	Following station
Marconiplein towards Vlaardingen West	Line A Not on evenings and early weekend mornings	Coolhaven towards Binnenhof
Marconiplein towards Hoek van Holland Strand	Line B	Coolhaven towards Nesselande
Marconiplein towards De Akkers	Line C	Coolhaven towards De Terp
Location

Delfshaven is an underground subway station in the Dutch city of Rotterdam, served by lines A, B, and C of the Rotterdam Metro. The station is part of the two station long extension of the East-West Line (or Caland line), and it opened on 25 April 1986. This extension connected the line's former terminus Coolhaven with the new Marconiplein station.

In 2001, Delfshaven station was renovated. Since then, the walls of the station show traditional Delft blue motives.

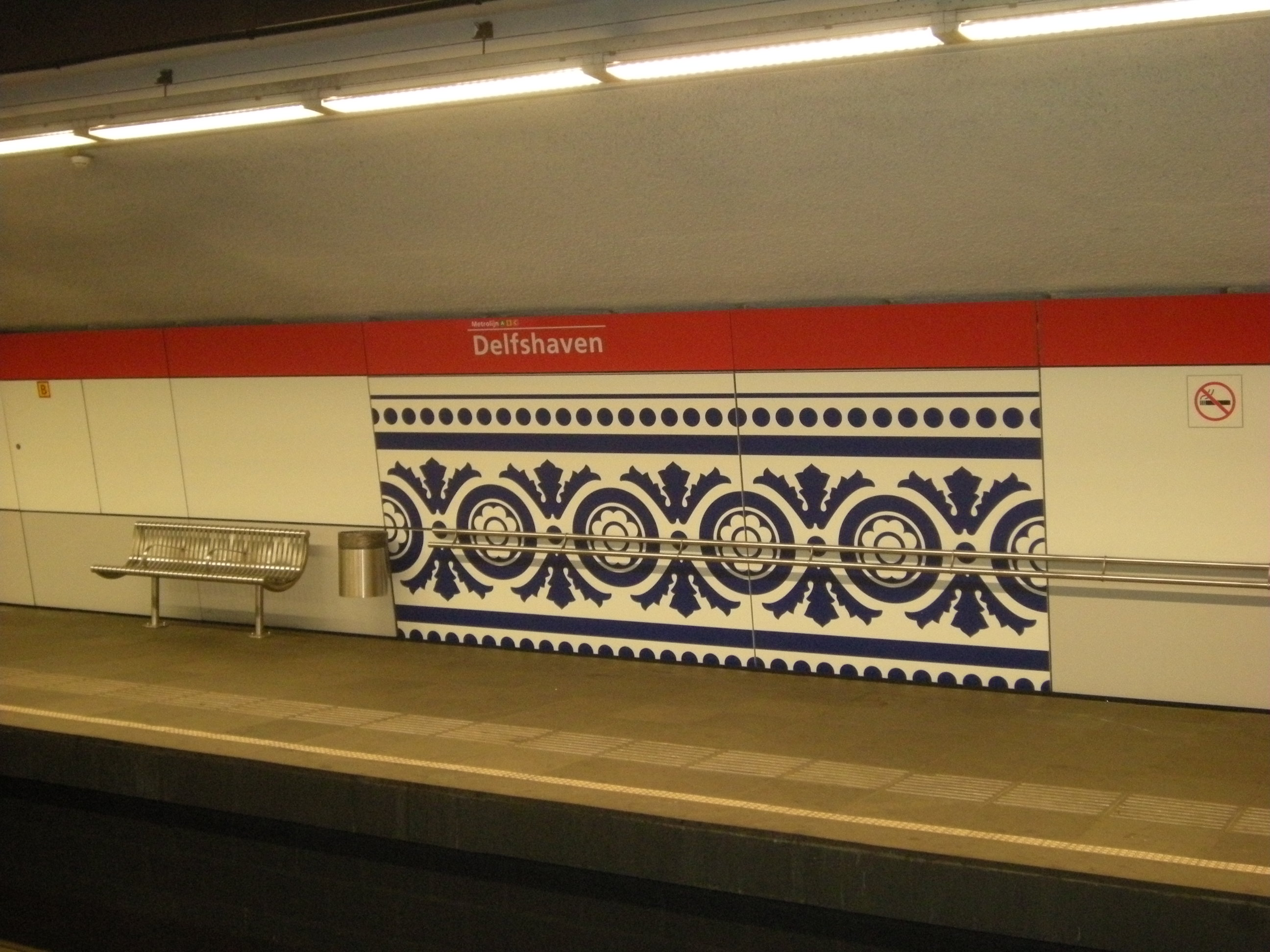
Delftware style decorated platform wall
