= Peter Jansen (art educator) =

Dutch art educator

Peter Jansen (born 1938) was educated as a painter at the Royal Academy of Art in The Hague, the Netherlands. He taught art at the Academy of Art in Rotterdam and the Utrecht School of the Arts. He was a pioneer in the use of computers in art education in the Netherlands and in 1988 he became Managing Director of the Utrecht School of the Arts, Faculty of Art, Media & Technology. At the moment he travels non-stop over the world, creating his 'Panoramic Works'.

He uses a large variety of shot types and then manipulates them together. He then places them together in one image so that he can create sculptures of movement to represent what happens over a period of time.

His sculptures are mainly based on human movement.
