= Lists of LGBTQ politicians =

Lists of LGBTQ politicians include:

- List of openly LGBTQ state leaders
  - List of reportedly LGBTQ state leaders throughout history
- List of the first openly LGBTQ holders of political offices

== By country ==
- List of LGBTQ holders of political offices in Australia
- List of LGBTQ politicians in Brazil
- List of LGBTQ politicians in Canada
  - List of the first openly LGBTQ holders of political offices in Canada
- List of LGBTQ politicians in France
- List of LGBTQ politicians in Germany
- List of LGBTQ politicians in Ireland
- List of LGBTQ holders of political offices in the Netherlands
- List of LGBTQ holders of political offices in New Zealand
- List of LGBTQ politicians in Poland
- List of LGBTQ politicians in Portugal
- List of LGBTQ politicians in Spain
- List of LGBTQ politicians in the United Kingdom
  - List of the first openly LGBTQ holders of political offices in the United Kingdom
- List of LGBTQ politicians in the United States
  - List of first openly LGBTQ politicians in the United States
  - List of LGBTQ members of the United States Congress

== See also ==
- Lists of LGBTQ people
