= Lists of LGBTQ people =

Lists of LGBTQ people include:

== LGBTQ people by demographic ==
- List of gay, lesbian or bisexual people
- List of bisexual people
- List of intersex people
- List of pansexual people
- List of transgender people
- List of non-binary people
- List of people on the aromantic spectrum
- List of people on the asexual spectrum

== By ethnicity or religion ==
- List of LGBT African Americans
- List of LGBTQ Catholics
- List of LGBT Jews
- List of LGBTQ Armenians

== By location ==
- List of LGBTQ people from Chicago
- List of LGBT people from London
- List of LGBTQ people from New York City
- List of LGBT people from New Zealand
- List of LGBTQ people from Portland, Oregon
- List of LGBTQ people from San Francisco
- List of LGBTQ people from Seattle

== Politicians ==
- List of LGBT heads of government
- List of LGBT holders of political offices in the Netherlands
- List of LGBTQ members of the United States Congress
- List of LGBT politicians in Canada
- List of LGBT politicians in France
- List of LGBTQ politicians in Germany
- List of LGBT politicians in Spain
- List of LGBT politicians in the United Kingdom
- List of LGBTI holders of political offices in Australia
- List of the first LGBT holders of political offices
- List of the first LGBT holders of political offices in Canada
- List of the first LGBT holders of political offices in the United Kingdom
- List of the first LGBTQ holders of political offices in the United States

== Entertainers ==
- List of LGBTQ Academy Award winners and nominees
- List of LGBT sportspeople
- List of LGBTQ writers
- List of LGBTQ YouTubers
- List of LGBTQ artists

== Others ==
- List of LGBT ambassadors of the United States
- List of LGBT state supreme court justices

== See also ==
- List of LGBTQ-related suicides
- List of LGBTQ rights activists
- List of cross-dressers
