= Brian Peters =

Brian Peters may refer to:

- Brian Peters (folk singer) (born 1954), English folk singer and multi-instrumentalist
- Brian Peters (gridiron football) (born 1988), American football linebacker
- Brian Daniel Peters (fl. 2010s), birth name of American drag performer Mama Tits
