= List of reportedly LGBTQ state leaders throughout history =

The following is a list of state leaders throughout history who were reportedly LGBTQ but lived at a time with different views on sexuality and gender and/or never publicly came out, or were privately closeted. The article is for those who are reported by posthumous sources as being LGBTQ (or a sexual and/or gender minority) (Note: LGBTQ is an initialism for lesbian, gay, bisexual, transgender and queer or questioning which functions as an umbrella term broadly referring to all sexualities, romantic orientations, sex characteristics, and gender identities that are not heterosexual, heteroromantic, cisgender, or endosex.) and head of a sovereign state. It is difficult to piece together how historical figures would have self-identified, and modern terms and frameworks around sex and gender can be very different from past cultures. Additionally, the criminalization and stigmatization of gender and sexual diversity is common throughout history, which motivated many LGBTQ people to remain closeted, and excluded LGBTQ topics and people from historical records. The list is sorted by year of death from oldest to newest with examples ranging from 300 BCE to 2000 CE.

== BCE ==
- Alexander the Great (356–323 BCE) – King of Macedon (336–323 BCE). Alexander's sexuality has been the subject of speculation and controversy in modern times, with many stating he had male lovers.
- Emperor Ai of Han (25–1 BCE) – Emperor of China's Han dynasty (7–1 BCE). He is reported to have had at least one male lover.

== 1 CE to 1700s ==
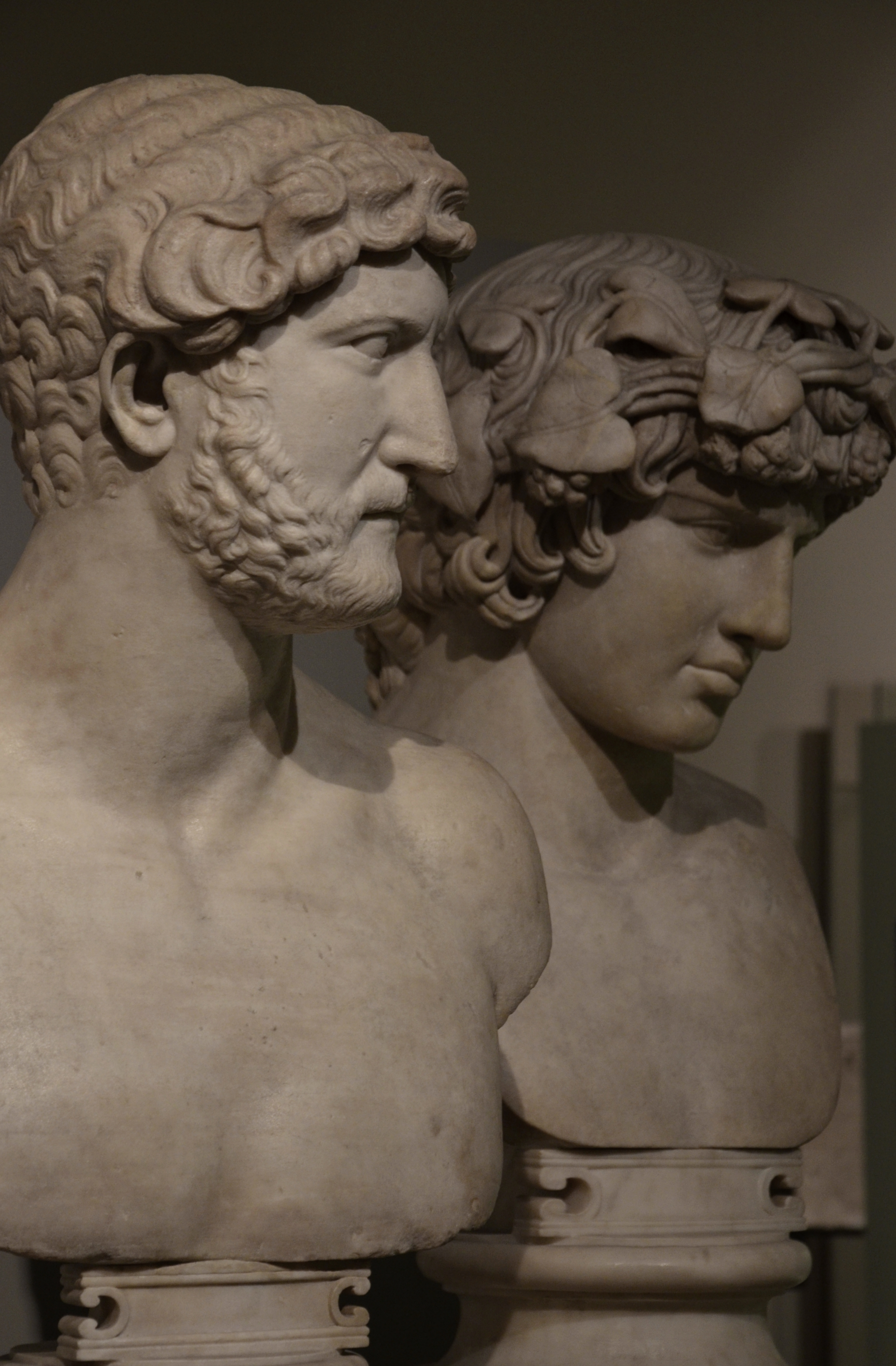
Busts of the Roman emperor Hadrian (left) and his partner Antinous.

- Hadrian (76–138) – Roman emperor (117–138). Had a male lover Antinous.
- Elagabalus (c. 204–222) – Roman emperor (218–222). He had male courtiers sources suggest were his lovers. Some historians also state that Elagabalus identified as a woman and sought sex reassignment surgery, while others state that those beliefs originated in accounts that are hostile to the emperor and may be untrustworthy.
- Peter I of Portugal (1320–1367) – King of Portugal (1357–1367). Following the Chronicle of the King D. Pedro I, Peter I had another passion besides Inês de Castro, in this case, for a squire named Afonso Madeira, whom, according to Fernão Lopes himself, "he loved more than should be said here"

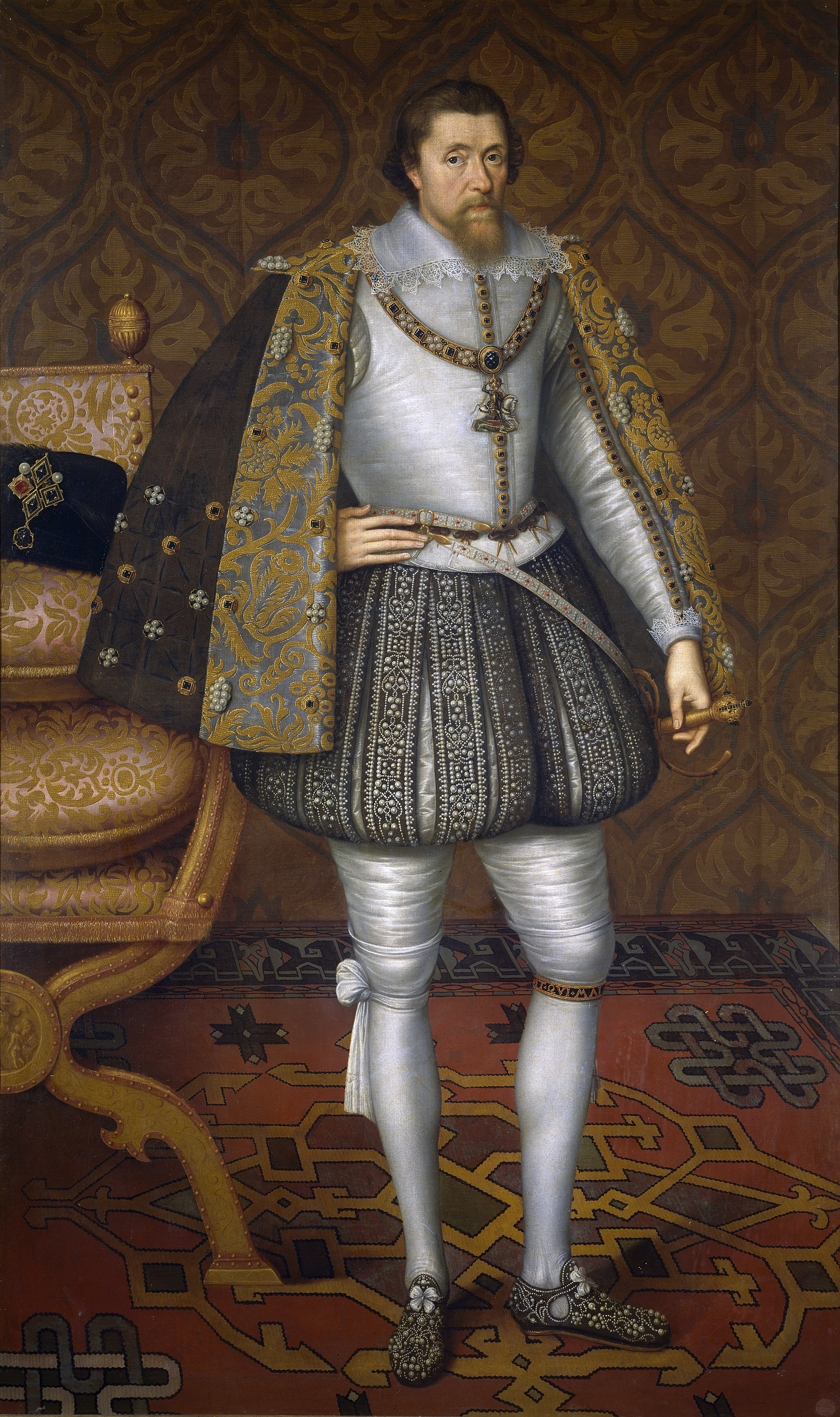
Painting of King James I

- Ali of the Eretnids (1353–1380) – Sultan of the Eretnids starting at age 13 (1366–1380). His reported teen love for another male was stigmatized and contributed to him being largely disregarded in political matters from a young age.
- Xicomecoatl (before 1519 – after 1520) – Ruler of Cempoala during Aztec control of the city. Openly had sexual relationships with other men, with homosexuality being very common in Cempoala.
- King James VI and I (1566–1625) – King of England, Ireland and Scotland (1603–1625). Reported to have had a number of male lovers.
- William III of England (1650–1702) – King of England, Ireland, and Scotland (1689–1702). During the 1690s, rumors grew of William's alleged homosexual inclinations and led to the publication of many satirical pamphlets by his Jacobite detractors. He did have several close male associates, including two Dutch courtiers to whom he granted English titles: Hans Willem Bentinck became Earl of Portland, and Arnold Joost van Keppel was created Earl of Albemarle. These relationships with male friends, and his apparent lack of mistresses, led William's enemies to suggest that he might prefer homosexual relationships. William's modern biographers disagree on the veracity of these allegations, but some believe there may have been truth to the rumors.
- Frederick the Great (1712–1786) – King of Prussia (1740–1786). Was officially married to Elisabeth Christine of Brunswick-Wolfenbüttel-Bevern, but he is considered to have been homosexual by most historians. He had many suspected relationships with men and wrote homoerotic poetry. He never came out, although he did not do much to hide it. After his death, many historians tried to pass off his homosexuality as a rumor, but it is now widely accepted.

== 1800s ==
- William II (1792–1849) – King of the Netherlands (1840–1849). Was bisexual; he had been blackmailed because of his sexual orientation.
- James Buchanan (1791–1868) – President of the United States (1857–1861). Never married. Reported to have had a longtime male romantic partner.

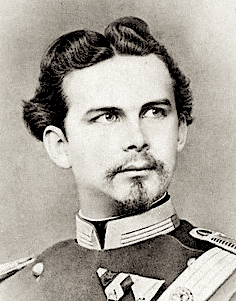
Photo of Ludwig II

- Ludwig II (1845–1886) – King of Bavaria (1864–1886). Ludwig never married nor had any known mistresses. His diary, private letters, and other documents reveal his same-sex romantic desires, which were stigmatized in the Roman Catholic Church. Throughout his reign, Ludwig had a succession of likely sexual romantic relationships with men, including his aide-de-camp Bavarian Prince Paul von Thurn und Taxis, his chief equerry and master of the horse, Richard Hornig, Hungarian theater actor Josef Kainz, and courtier Alfons Weber. Letters from Ludwig reveal that the quartermaster of the royal stables, Karl Hesselschwerdt, acted as his male procurer.

== 1900s ==
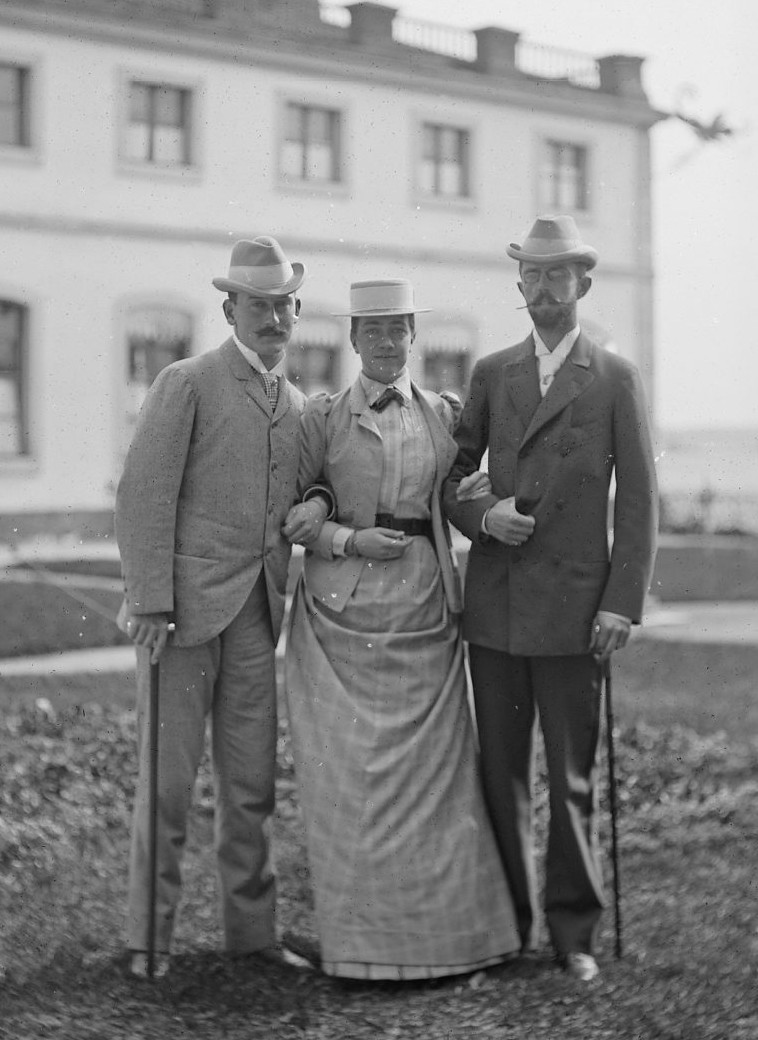
1890 photo of a young Max von Baden. He was listed as a known homosexual by law enforcement of the time
- Max von Baden (1867–1929) – German Chancellor and Prime Minister of Prussia (1918). He was gay, and was listed as such in a document by the Baden criminal police when he was young, but entered an arranged marriage with Princess Marie Louise of Hanover, with whom he produced two children. He is said to have been in a relationship with geologist Wilhelm Paulcke from at least 1912. He attempted to change his attractions by the efforts of Swedish psychiatrist Axel Munthe, and was blackmailed by Augusta Schleswig-Holstein with the threat of being publicly outed.
- Kārlis Ulmanis (1877–1942) – Leader of Latvia (1934–1940). Unmarried and his possible sexual orientation was actively discussed both during his reign and after the restoration of Latvia's independence.
- Edward Heath (1916–2005) – Prime Minister of the United Kingdom (1970–1974). Unmarried, his sexuality was widely discussed during and after his premiership. Michael McManus, Heath's private secretary, believed him to be a gay man who had sacrificed his personal life to his political career. This view was also reportedly held by one of Heath's successors, Margaret Thatcher, as well as by Heath's friend Jeremy Norman who described him as a "deeply closeted gay man". Heath himself claimed that he never married as he was too focused on building a career after the Second World War.
- Qaboos bin Said (1940–2020) – Sultan of Oman (1970–2020). Qaboos, who was divorced from a marriage to Nawwal bint Tariq and had no children, was widely believed by Omanis and Gulf Arabs to be homosexual. His obituary in The Times described rumors throughout his life of "liaisons with elegant young European men".
- Canaan Banana (1936–2003) – First President of Zimbabwe (1980–1987). Reported to be either gay or bisexual in 1997, despite his denial. After a highly publicized trial, he was convicted in 1998 of 11 counts of sodomy and "unnatural acts", for which he was imprisoned for six months.

== See also ==
- List of openly LGBTQ state leaders
- List of current heads of state and government
- List of elected and appointed female state leaders
- Lists of LGBTQ people
  - Lists of LGBTQ politicians
  - LGBTQ nobility and royalty
