= List of LGBTQ people from London =

This is a list of notable LGBTQ people from the city of London.

== Activists ==
- Michael C. Burgess
- Jennifer Fear
- Peter Tatchell

== Aviation and military ==
- James Wharton (author)
- Ethel Mary Smyth

== Arts and entertainment ==
=== Actors ===
- Stephen Fry
- Ian McKellen
- Sir John Gielgud
- Kenneth Williams
- Saffron Dominique Burrows
- Amanda Donohoe
- Sophie Ward
- Jill Esmond

=== Artists ===
- Duncan Grant
- Bisila Noha, ceramic artist and director of the London LGBTQ+ Community Centre
- Charles Rose, New Zealand artist

=== Comedians ===
- Alan Carr

=== Culinary arts ===
- Yotam Ottolenghi
- Peter Gordon

=== Dance ===
- Frederick Ashton
- Matthew Bourne
- Frederic Franklin
- Wayne Sleep

=== DJs ===
- Samantha Ronson

=== Film ===
- Derek Jarman
- Anthony William Lars Asquith
- John Schlesinger
- Isaac Julien

=== Music ===
- Boy George
- Freddie Mercury (1946-1991)
- George Michael (1963-2016)
- Marc Almond
- Mika
- Pete Burns
- Rylan Clark-Neal
- Samantha Fox
- Thomas Adès
- Will Young
- Stephen Hough

=== Television ===
- Paul O'Grady
- Graham Norton
- Dale Winton

=== Theatre ===
- Oscar Wilde (1854-1900)

== Business ==
- John Maynard Keynes (1883–1946)

== Science, mathematics and technology ==
- Alan Turing
- Colin Turnbull
- James Joseph Sylvester

== Sports ==
- Tom Daley

== Writers ==
- Edward Morgan Forster
- Oscar Wilde
- Siegfried Sassoon
- Lytton Strachey
- Radclyffe Hall
- Virginia Woolf (1882-1941)
- Joe Randolph "J. R." Ackerley
- Peter Ackroyd
- Daniel Tammet
- Colin MacInnes
- Daphne du Maurier
