= List of openly LGBTQ state leaders =

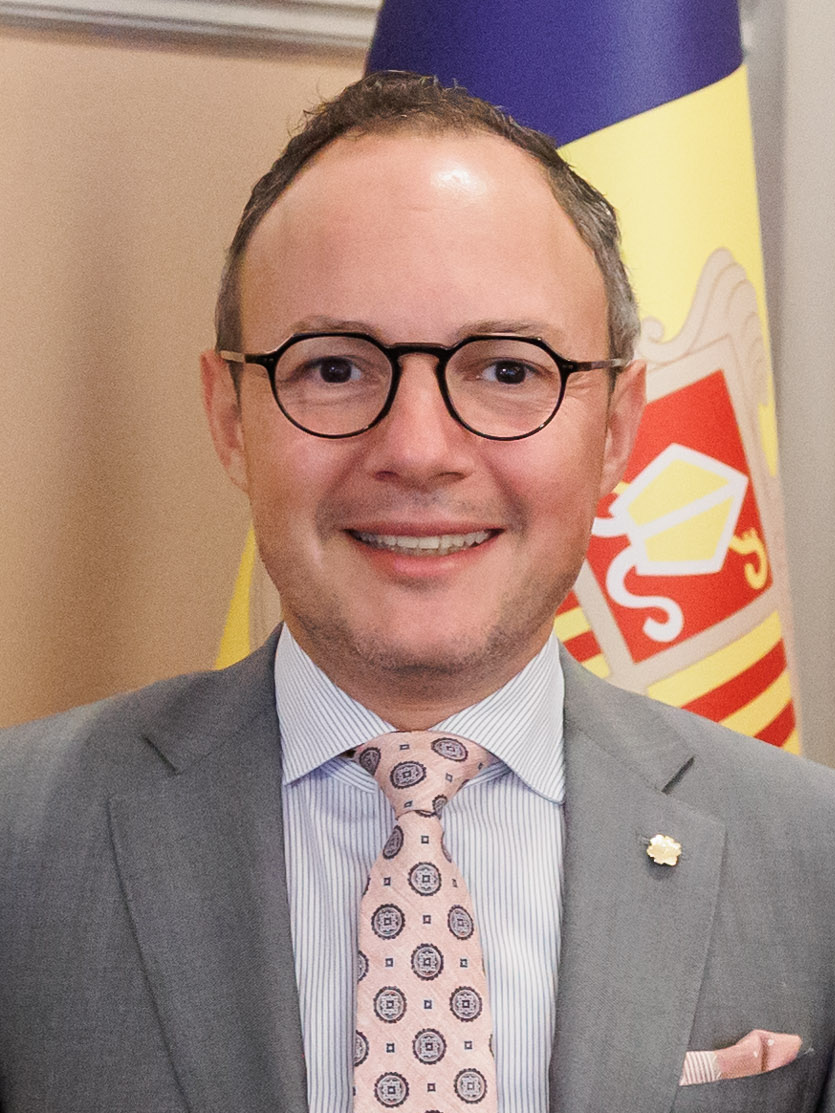
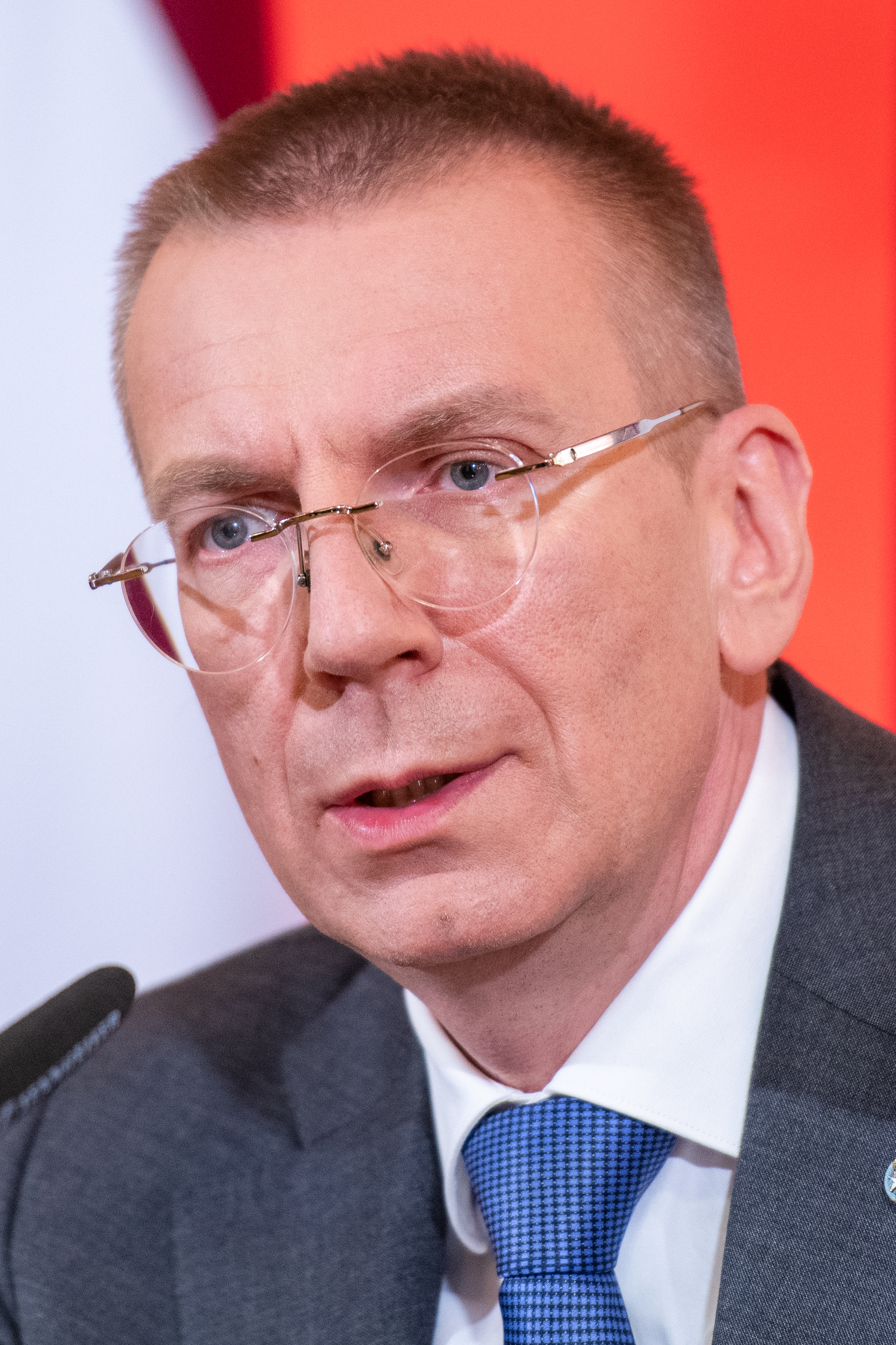
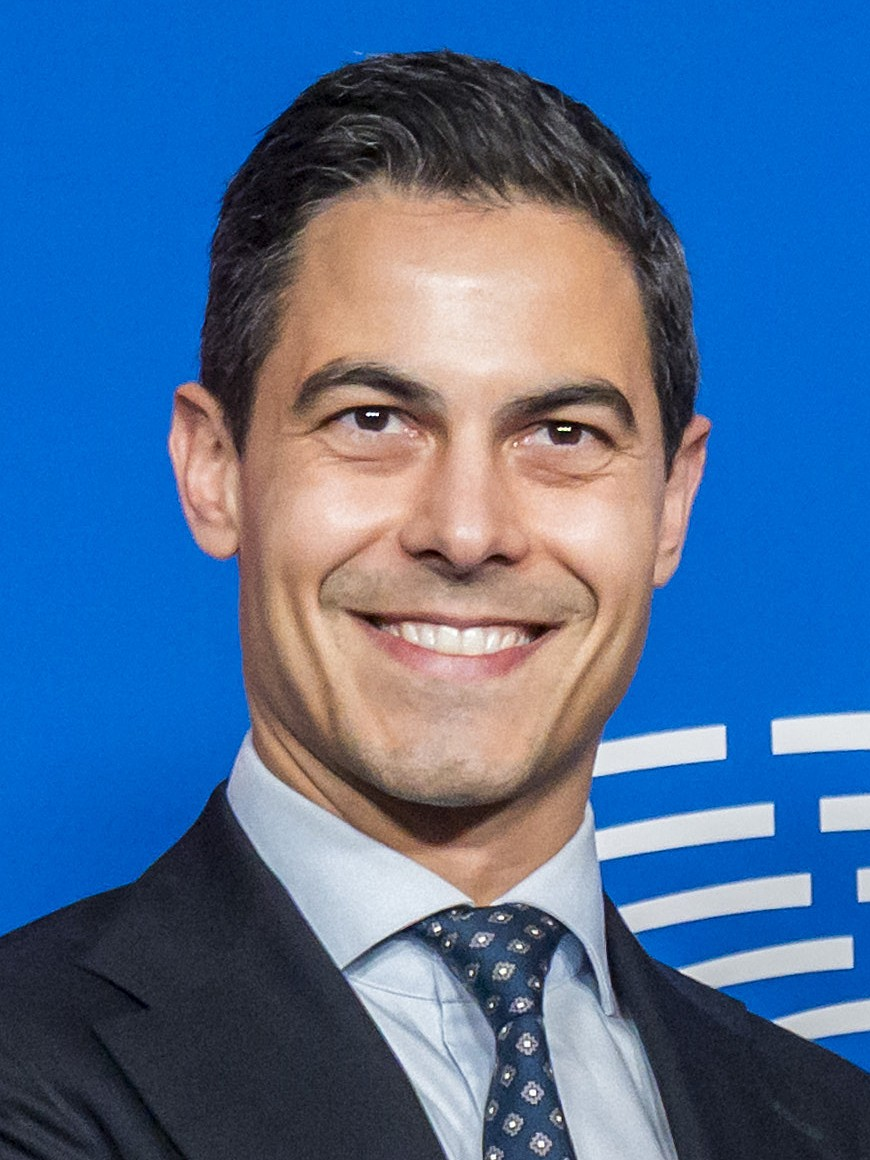
Incumbent openly LGBTQ state leaders:
- Xavier Espot Zamora, Prime Minister of Andorra
- Edgars Rinkēvičs, President of Latvia
- Rob Jetten, Prime Minister of the Netherlands

Politicians openly identifying themselves as members of the LGBTQ community have served as national leaders in ten sovereign states. Of those countries, two have had an openly LGBTQ head of state, who serves as the country's public persona. Eight other sovereign states have had an openly LGBTQ head of government, who is the highest official in that state's government. Only Serbia has had both an openly LGBTQ head of state and openly LGBTQ head of government after Ana Brnabić became acting President in 2026 having previously served as Prime Minister. However, no sovereign state has had more than one openly LGBTQ national leader. Additionally, no sovereign state outside of Europe has had an openly LGBTQ national leader.

Jóhanna Sigurðardóttir became the first openly LGBTQ+ politician to serve as a country's head of government upon the start of her tenure as Prime Minister of Iceland in 2009. Two years later, Elio Di Rupo became the first openly gay head of government upon becoming Prime Minister of Belgium. Upon assuming the office of a captain regent of San Marino on 1 April 2022, Paolo Rondelli became the first openly LGBTQ+ head of state.

Gay men have been the majority of openly LGBTQ+ national leaders, with seven of the ten politicians in this role identifying as such. Two openly LGBTQ+ heads of government identify as lesbian, and one as bisexual. Other identities in the LGBTQ community, including, transgender, and intersex, have therefore not been openly represented in world heads of state and heads of government.

The totals for this list include only openly identifying members of the LGBTQ community who have come out prior to the end of their term as head of state or head of government of a United Nations member state. Therefore, LGBTQ national leaders who were closeted or outed during their tenure as a national leader are not included. Moreover, openly LGBTQ politicians who have served in other positions, such as acting president, deputy prime minister, and leaders of subnational entities, are excluded from this list.

== List ==
The following list includes all openly LGBTQ heads of state and government. Politicians are listed based on the start of their tenures as national leaders.

* denotes an incumbent leader of a sovereign state

Name	Portrait	Country	Office	Type of leader	Tenure start	Tenure end	Term length	Sexual orientation (Note: All openly LGBTQ national leaders have been cisgender and endosex.)
Jóhanna Sigurðardóttir	Portrait of Jóhanna Sigurðardóttir	Iceland	Prime Minister	Head of government	1 February 2009	23 May 2013	4 years, 111 days	Lesbian
Elio Di Rupo	Portrait of Elio Di Rupo	Belgium	Prime Minister	Head of government	6 December 2011	11 October 2014	2 years, 309 days	Bisexual
Xavier Bettel	Portrait of Xavier Bettel	Luxembourg	Prime Minister	Head of government	4 December 2013	17 November 2023	9 years, 348 days	Gay
Leo Varadkar	Portrait of Leo Varadkar	Ireland	Taoiseach	Head of government	14 June 2017	27 June 2020	3 years, 13 days	Gay
Leo Varadkar	Portrait of Leo Varadkar	Ireland	Taoiseach	Head of government	17 December 2022	9 April 2024	1 year, 114 days	Gay
Ana Brnabić	Portrait of Ana Brnabić	Serbia	Prime Minister	Head of government	29 June 2017	20 March 2024	6 years, 265 days	Lesbian
Ana Brnabić	Portrait of Ana Brnabić	Serbia	Acting President	Head of state	28 September 2026	17 November 2026	50 days	Lesbian
Xavier Espot Zamora*	Portrait of Xavier Espot Zamora	Andorra	Prime Minister	Head of government	16 May 2019	Incumbent	7 years, 188 days	Gay
Paolo Rondelli		San Marino	Captain Regent	Head of state	1 April 2022	1 October 2022	183 days	Gay
Edgars Rinkēvičs*	Portrait of Edgars Rinkēvičs	Latvia	President	Head of state	8 July 2023	Incumbent	3 years, 135 days	Gay
Gabriel Attal	Portrait of Gabriel Attal	France	Prime Minister	Head of government	9 January 2024	5 September 2024	240 days	Gay
Rob Jetten*	Portrait of Rob Jetten	Netherlands	Prime Minister	Head of government	23 February 2026	Incumbent	270 days	Gay

== See also ==
- List of reportedly LGBTQ heads of state throughout history
- List of current heads of state and government
- List of elected and appointed female heads of state and government
- Lists of LGBTQ people
  - Lists of LGBTQ politicians
- List of openly LGBTQ sub-national leaders
