= List of LGBTQ politicians in Germany =

The following is a list of gay, lesbian, bisexual and/or transgender individuals who have been elected as members of the Bundestag, European Union, state parliaments, local parliaments, to positions of leadership, or parliaments of the entities that preceded the modern Federal Republic of Germany and its states.

== Federal Cabinet ==
Portrait	Name	Position	Term	Party	Notes	Ref.
	Guido Westerwelle (1961–2016)	Vice-Chancellor of Germany	2009–2011	Free Democratic Party		
	Guido Westerwelle (1961–2016)	Minister for Foreign Affairs	2009–2013	Free Democratic Party		
	Barbara Hendricks (born 1952)	Federal Minister for the Environment, Climate Action, Nature Conservation and Nuclear Safety	2013–2018	Social Democratic Party of Germany		
	Michael Roth (born 1970)	Minister of State for Europe at the Federal Foreign Office	2013–2021	Social Democratic Party of Germany		
	Jens Spahn (born 1980)	Federal Minister of Health	2018–2021	Christian Democratic Union of Germany		

== Bundestag/Reichstag ==
=== Since 1949 ===
==== Incumbent ====
Portrait	Name	Position	Term	Party	Constituency	Notes	Ref.
	Michael Roth (born 1970)	Minister of State for Europe at the Federal Foreign Office	1998–2025	Social Democratic Party of Germany	Werra-Meißner – Hersfeld-Rotenburg		
	Matthias Miersch (born 1968)	Member of the Bundestag	2005–present	Social Democratic Party of Germany	Hannover-Land II		
	Jens Spahn (born 1980)	Member of the Bundestag	2002–present	Christian Democratic Union of Germany	Steinfurt I – Borken I		
	Stefan Kaufmann (born 1969)	Member of the Bundestag	2009–2021	Christian Democratic Union of Germany		First openly gay man in the CDU	
	Stefan Kaufmann (born 1969)	Member of the Bundestag	2024–2025	Christian Democratic Union of Germany		First openly gay man in the CDU	
	Lars Castellucci (born 1974)	Member of the Bundestag	2013–present	SPD	Rhein-Neckar		
	Ursula Schauws (born 1966)	Member of the Bundestag	2013–present	Alliance 90/The Greens	Krefeld II – Wesel II		
	Wolfgang Stefinger (born 1985)	Member of the Bundestag	2013–present	CSU	Munich East		
	Kay Gottschalk (born 1965)	Member of the Bundestag	2017–present	Alternative for Germany	Viersen	former Deputy Leader of the AfD	
	Timon Gremmels (born 1976)	Member of the Bundestag	2017–2024	SPD	Kassel		
	Sven Lehmann (born 1979)	Member of the Bundestag	2017–present	Greens	Cologne II		
	Falko Mohrs (born 1984)	Member of the Bundestag	2017–2022	SPD	Helmstedt – Wolfsburg		
	Sepp Müller (born 1989)	Member of the Bundestag	2017–present	CDU	Anhalt – Dessau – Wittenberg		
	Alice Weidel (born 1979)	Member of the Bundestag	2017–present	AfD	Bodensee	federal party chairwoman of the AfD	
	Wolfgang Wetzel (born 1968)	Member of the Bundestag	2017–2021	Greens	Zwickau		
	Takis Mehmet Ali (born 1991)	Member of the Bundestag	2021–2024	SPD	Lörrach – Müllheim		
	Johannes Arlt (born 1984)	Member of the Bundestag	2021–2024	SPD	Mecklenburgische Seenplatte II – Landkreis Rostock III		
	Andreas Audretsch (born 1984)	Member of the Bundestag	2021–present	Greens	Berlin-Neukölln		
	Felix Banaszak (born 1989)	Member of the Bundestag	2021–present	Alliance 90/The Greens	Duisburg II		
	Falko Droßmann (born 1973)	Member of the Bundestag	2021–present	SPD	Hamburg-Mitte		
	Emilia Fester (born 1998)	Member of the Bundestag	2021–2025	Greens	Hamburg		
	Tessa Ganserer (born 1977)	Member of the Bundestag	2021–2025	Greens	Nuremberg North		
	Bruno Hönel (born 1996)	Member of the Bundestag	2021–present	Greens	Lübeck		
	Carlos Kasper (born 1994)	Member of the Bundestag	2021–2025	SPD	Chemnitzer Umland – Erzgebirgskreis II		
	Konstantin Kuhle (born 1989)	Member of the Bundestag	2021–2025	FDP	Göttingen I		
	Kevin Kühnert (born 1989)	Member of the Bundestag	2021–2025	SPD	Berlin-Tempelhof-Schöneberg	former Juso federal chairman	
	Ricarda Lang (born 1994)	Member of the Bundestag	2021–present	Greens	Backnang – Schwäbisch Gmünd	federal party chairwoman of the Greens	
	Jürgen Lenders (born 1966)	Member of the Bundestag	2021–2025	Free Democratic Party	Fulda		
	Max Lucks (born 1997)	Member of the Bundestag	2021–present	Greens	Bochum I		
	Marlene Schönberger (born 1990)	Member of the Bundestag	2021–present	Greens	Rottal-Inn		
	Nyke Slawik (born 1994)	Member of the Bundestag	2021–present	Greens	Leverkusen – Cologne IV		
	Tobias Ebenberger (born 1990)	Member of the Bundestag	2025–present	Alternative for Germany	Rhein-Sieg-Kreis I		
	Lin Lindner (born 1994)	Member of the Bundestag	2025–present	Die Linke			
	Lisa Schubert (born 2002)	Member of the Bundestag	2025–present	Die Linke	Düsseldorf II		

==== Former ====
Birth year	Name	Party	Home state	Position	Note
1941	Jutta Oesterle-Schwerin	Greens		former Member of the Bundestag	
1947	Jörg van Essen	FDP	North Rhine-Westphalia	former Member of the Bundestag	
1949	Thomas Sattelberger	FDP	Bavaria	former Member of the Bundestag	
1952	Barbara Hendricks	SPD	North Rhine-Westphalia	former Federal Environment Minister, former MP	
1952	Christian Schenk	PDS, Greens		former Member of the Bundestag	came out as trans after tenure ended
1952	Herbert Rusche	Greens, Pirates	Hesse	former Member of the Bundestag	
1953	Karl-Heinz Brunner	SPD	Bavaria	former Member of the Bundestag	
1954	Reinhold Robbe	SPD	Lower Saxony	former Member of the Bundestag	
1956	Birgitt Bender	Greens	Baden-Württemberg	former Member of the Bundestag	
1957	Karin Binder	Left Party		former Member of the Bundestag	
1957	Uwe Schummer	CDU	North Rhine-Westphalia	former Member of the Bundestag	
1960	Volker Beck	Greens	North Rhine-Westphalia	former Member of the Bundestag	
1960	Bettina Herlitzius	Greens	North Rhine-Westphalia	former Member of the Bundestag	
1961	Guido Westerwelle	FDP	North Rhine-Westphalia	former Foreign Minister, former MP	
1962	Harald Petzold	Left Party	Brandenburg	former Member of the Bundestag	
1963	Anja Hajduk	Greens	Hamburg	former Member of the Bundestag	
1963	Michael Hartmann	SPD	Rhineland-Palatinate	former Member of the Bundestag	
1963	Johannes Kahrs	SPD	Hamburg	former Member of the Bundestag	
1964	Achim Kessler	Left Party	Hesse	former Member of the Bundestag	
1965	Bernd Fabritius	CSU	Bavaria	former Member of the Bundestag	
1966	Lutz Heilmann	Left Party	Schleswig-Holstein	former Member of the Bundestag	
1967	Michael Kauch	FDP	North Rhine-Westphalia	former Member of the Bundestag	
1969	Sebastian Edathy	SPD	Lower Saxony	former Member of the Bundestag	
1972	Gerhard Schick	Greens	Baden-Württemberg	former Member of the Bundestag	
1973	Sabine Jünger	Left Party	Mecklenburg-Vorpommern	former Member of the Bundestag	
1975	Matthias Höhn	Left Party	Saxony-Anhalt	former Member of the Bundestag	
1976	Doris Achelwilm	Left Party	Bremen	former Member of the Bundestag	

=== Before 1949 ===
Birth year	Name	Party	Home state	Position	Note
1854	Friedrich Alfred Krupp	FkP	Prussia	former Member of the Reichstag	
1887	Ernst Röhm	NSFP, NSDAP	Bavaria	former member of the Reich Defense Council, former MP	former leader of the SA
1897	Edmund Heines	NSDAP	Bavaria	former Member of the Reichstag	

== State-level ==
=== Since 1949 ===
==== Incumbent ====
Birth year	Name	Party	State	Position	Note
1962	Farid Müller	Greens	Hamburg	Member of the Bürgerschaft	
1962	Detlev Schulz-Hendel	Greens	Lower Saxony	Member of the Landtag	
1964	Frank-Christian Hansel	AfD	Berlin	Member of the Abgeordnetenhaus	
1966	Heiner Garg	FDP	Schleswig-Holstein	Member of the Landtag	State Chairman of the FDP Schleswig-Holstein, former State Minister
1970	Carsten Schatz	Left Party	Berlin	Member of the Abgeordnetenhaus	
1971	Arndt Klocke	Greens	North Rhine-Westphalia	Member of the Landtag	
1973	Kai Klose	Greens	Hesse	Member of the Landtag	
1973	Arne Platzbecker	SPD	Hamburg	Member of the Bürgerschaft	
1973	Jennifer Schubert	Greens	Thuringia	Member of the Landtag	
1974	Thomas de Jesus Fernandes	AfD	Mecklenburg-Vorpommern	Member of the Landtag	
1974	Klaus Lederer	Left Party	Berlin	Member of the Abgeordnetenhaus	
1975	Daniel Born	SPD	Baden-Württemberg	Member of the Landtag	
1975	Daniel Wesener	Greens	Berlin	Member of the Abgeordnetenhaus	
1977	Fabian Kirsch	SPD	Rhineland-Palatinate	Member of the Landtag	
1979	Katja Meier	Greens	Saxony	Member of the Landtag	
1979	Jan Redmann	CDU	Brandenburg	Member of the Landtag	
1979	Sebastian Walter	Greens	Berlin	Member of the Abgeordnetenhaus	
1980	Stefan Evers	CDU	Berlin	Member of the Abgeordnetenhaus	
1980	Werner Graf	Greens	Berlin	Member of the Abgeordnetenhaus	
1981	Sven Tritschler	AfD	North Rhine-Westphalia	Member of the Landtag	
1981	Matthias Vogler	AfD	Bavaria	Member of the Landtag	
1982	Josefine Paul	Greens	North Rhine-Westphalia	Member of the Landtag	
1982	Dennis Paustian-Döscher	Greens	Hamburg	Member of the Bürgerschaft	
1983	Maximilian Böltl	CSU	Bavaria	Member of the Landtag	
1985	René Gögge	Greens	Hamburg	Member of the Bürgerschaft	
1986	Marc Vallendar	AfD	Berlin	Member of the Abgeordnetenhaus	
1988	Oliver Hildenbrand	Greens	Baden-Württemberg	Member of the Landtag	
1989	Vanessa Gronemann	Greens	Hesse	Member of the Landtag	
1990	Sascha Haas	SPD	Saarland	Member of the Landtag	
1990	Moritz Körner	FDP	North Rhine-Westphalia	Member of the Landtag	
1991	Simon Kuchinke	SPD	Hamburg	Member of the Bürgerschaft	
1992	Vasili Franco	Greens	Berlin	Member of the Abgeordnetenhaus	
1995	Felix Martin	Greens	Hesse	Member of the Landtag	
1996	Louis Krüger	Greens	Berlin	Member of the Landtag	

==== Former ====
Birth year	Name	Party	State	Position	Note
1939	Helga Schuchardt	FDP, SPD	Hamburg/Lower Saxony	formerly held multiple ministerial positions in both states	
1948	Stephan Holthoff-Pförtner	CDU	North Rhine-Westphalia	former State Minister for European Affairs, former MP	
1949	Ute Pape	SPD	Hamburg	former Senator, former MP	
1950	Anne Klein	Greens, Independent	Berlin	former Senator, former MP	
1953	Klaus Wowereit	SPD	Berlin	former Mayor	
1955	Ole von Beust	CDU	Hamburg	former First Mayor of Hamburg, former MP	
1954	Roger Kusch	CDU	Hamburg	former Justice Senator	
1959	Karin Wolff	CDU	Hesse	former Minister of Education	
1960	Anja Kofbinger	Greens	Berlin	former Member of the Abgeordnetenhaus	
1960	Peter Kurth	CDU, Independent	Berlin	former State Minister of Finance, former MP	former candidate for mayor of Cologne
1960	Lutz Johannsen	SPD	Hamburg	former Member of the Bürgerschaft	
1960	Albert Eckert	Greens, Independent	Berlin	former Member of the Abgeordnetenhaus	
1961	Sibyll-Anka Klotz	Greens	Berlin	former Member of the Abgeordnetenhaus	
1964	Dietrich Wersich	CDU	Hamburg	former Member of the Bürgerschaft	
1966	Hakan Taş	Left Party	Berlin	former Member of the Abgeordnetenhaus	
1968	Markus Klaer	CDU	Berlin	former Member of the Abgeordnetenhaus	
1968	Andreas Matthae	SPD	Berlin	former Member of the Abgeordnetenhaus	
1970	Alexander Tassis	AfD	Bremen	former Member of the Bürgerschaft	former leader of the Alternative Homosexuals
1971	Dirk Behrendt	Greens	Berlin	former Member of the Abgeordnetenhaus	
1972	Chris Bollenbach	CDU	North Rhine-Westphalia	former Member of the Landtag	
1972	Gerwald Claus-Brunner	Pirates	Berlin	former Member of the Abgeordnetenhaus	
1973	Holger Arppe	AfD, Independent	Mecklenburg-Vorpommern	former Member of the Landtag	former city councilor in Rostock, was expelled from his party
1973	Roland Heintze	CDU	Hamburg	former Member of the Bürgerschaft	
1973	Sabine Jünger	Left Party	Mecklenburg-Vorpommern	former Member of the Landtag	
1973	Jan Stöß	SPD, Independent	Berlin	former Member of the Abgeordnetenhaus	former SPD state chairman
1973	Marc Ratajczak	CDU	North Rhine-Westphalia	former Member of the Landtag	
1975	Nicola Böcker-Giannini	SPD	Berlin	former member of Abgeordnetenhaus Berlin	
1975	Matthias Höhn	Left Party	Saxony	former Member of the Landtag	
1975	Sascha Steuer	CDU	Berlin	former Member of the Abgeordnetenhaus	
1976	David Profit	Greens	Rhineland-Palatinate	former Member of the Landtag	
1977	Philipp-Sebastian Kühn	SPD	Hamburg	former Member of the Bürgerschaft	
1978	Andreas Baum	Pirates	Berlin	former Member of the Abgeordnetenhaus	
1978	Tom Schreiber	SPD	Berlin	former Member of the Abgeordnetenhaus	
1979	Patrick Schreiber	CDU	Saxony	former Member of the Landtag	
1982	Robert Bläsing	FDP	Hamburg	former Member of the Bürgerschaft	
1984	Stefan Gruhner	CDU	Thuringia	former Member of the Landtag	
1986	Rasmus Andresen	Greens	Schleswig-Holstein	former Member of the Landtag	
1990	Elisabeth Kula	Left Party	Hesse	former Member of the Landtag	

== Members of the European Parliament ==
Birth year	Name	Party	Position	Note
1986	Rasmus Andresen	Greens	Member of the European Parliament for Germany	
1987	Terry Reintke	Greens	Leader of the Greens–European Free Alliance in the European Parliament, MEP	

=== Former ===
Birth year	Name	Party	Position	Note
1954	Lissy Gröner	Greens	former Member of the European Parliament for Germany	
1970	Holger Krahmer	FDP	former Member of the European Parliament for Germany	
1986	Felix Reda	Pirates	former Member of the European Parliament for Germany	came out as trans after tenure ended

== Municipal-level ==
Birth year	Name	Party	Name of the polity	Level	Position	Note
1959	Richard Arnold	CDU	Schwäbisch Gmünd	Municipality	Mayor	
1960	Reinhard Naumann	SPD	Charlottenburg-Willmersdorf	City borough	Borough Mayor	
1961	Thomas Niederbühl	Pink List	Munich	Municipality	City Councilor	first openly gay city councilor to be elected from a LGBT political organization in Europe
1964	Monika Herrmann	Greens	Friedrichshain-Kreuzberg	City borough	Borough Mayor	
1970	Torsten Ilg	FWK	Cologne	Municipality	City Councilor	
1973	Thomas Kufen	CDU	Essen	Municipality	Mayor	
1973	Christian Vorländer	SPD	Munich			
1974	Marc Herter	SPD	Hamm	Municipality	Mayor	
1978	Silvio Witt	Independent	Neubrandenburg	Municipality	Mayor	
1984	Michael Adam	SPD	Bodenmais	Municipality	Mayor	former Landrat of Regen
1986	Oliver Gortat	FW	Sipplingen	Municipality	Mayor	
1989	Felix Heinrichs	SPD	Mönchengladbach	Municipality	Mayor	
1990	Dominik Krause	Greens	Munich	Municipality	Mayor	
1991	Andreas Zippel	SPD	Bayreuth	Municipality	Mayor	
	Robert Kühn	SPD	Bad Wiessee	Municipality		
	Sven Partheil-Böhnke	FDP	Timmendorf	Municipality	Mayor	
	Dietmar Thönnes	Independent	Nottuln	Municipality	Mayor	
	Neidhard Varnhorn	CDU	Cloppenburg	Municipality	Mayor	

=== Former ===
Birth year	Name	Party	Name of the polity	Level	Position	Note
1949	Alexander Miklosy	Pink List	Ludwigsvorstadt-Isarvorstadt	City borough	Borough Mayor	
1956	Rolf Ohler	CDU	Wiesbaden		City Councilor	
1959	Richard Arnold	CDU	Schwäbisch Gmünd	Municipality	Mayor	
1960	Peter Hinze	SPD	Emmerich am Rhein	Municipality	Mayor	
1961	Hermann Brem	Greens	Munich			former chairman of the Young Liberals
1962	Pit Clausen	SPD	Bielefeld	Municipality	Mayor	
1967	Michael Ebling	SPD	Mainz	Municipality	Mayor	
1968	Andreas Matthae	SPD	Berlin-Kreuzberg	City borough	Borough Mayor	
1968	Helmut Metzner	FDP				
1974	Sven Gerich	SPD	Wiesbaden	Municipality	Mayor	
	Michael Gabel	Pro Cologne	Cologne	Municipality	City Councilor	
