= Bisila Noha =

Spanish ceramist (born 1988)

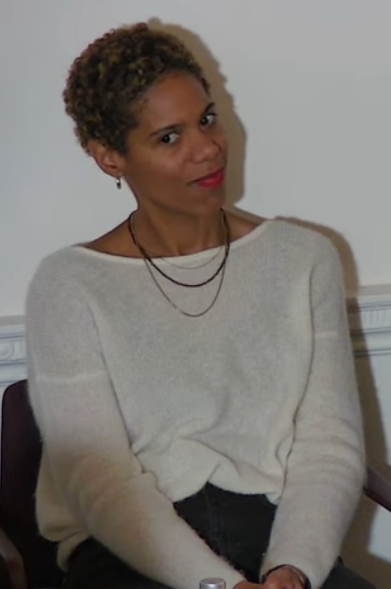
- In a Paul Mellon Centre video in 2024
- Born: Bisila Noha Pascual; April 1988 (age 38); Zaragoza, Spain
- Citizenship: Spanish, Equatoguinean
- Known for: Ceramics

Bisila Noha Pascual (born April 1988) is a Spanish ceramic and mixed materials artist and activist. Based in London, England, Noha's artwork aims to challenge Western art perspectives and advance feminist and anti-capitalist perspectives. She also holds Equatoguinean citizenship.

== Biography ==
Noha was born in 1988 and grew up in Zaragoza, Spain. Her mother was from Noviercas, Soria and her father was from the Bubi people in Baney, Equatorial Guinea.

She moved to Madrid for university, graduating with an undergraduate degree in translation and a master's degree in international relations. After graduation, her professional career brought her to Madrid, Leipzig, Vienna, San Francisco. In 2013, Noha moved to London, United Kingdom to pursue an opportunity at an advertising agency.

=== Art career ===
After moving to London, Noha began taking pottery classes and crafting her first pottery pieces. Without a background in the arts, she was largely self-taught, designing pottery to relax after work. Her initial designs focused on crafting practical clay tableware. Noha's technique developed to craft works combining storytelling to "blur the boundaries" between sculpture and tableware. Her early ceramic pieces are known for its distinctive marbled patterns, that evoke natural skies and storms.

Noha continued to refine her technique through travel, learning from traditional potters in Mexico, Italy, Armenia and Morocco. Inspired by the work of women from the global south, her work seeks to challenge contemporary ideas about authorship, design and labour. Noha additionally uses her pottery to explore her own identity and heritage. For example, she describes mixing using different colours of glaze as a metaphor to connect with her mixed race identity and experimenting with traditional Spanish pottery designs to showcase her Spanish heritage.

In 2020, she began the "Baney Clay Project", a series of works using clay that was brought back from the Baney village in Equatorial Guinea, the site of her father's ancestral home. She used the project to engage with her African identity, and to explore her "rebirth as a racialised woman". The stoneware and porcelain pieces utilize designs that evoke women's bodies and further challenge ideas around women's labour and identity. Noha has subsequently incorporated the volcanic red clays from Bioko island, and the home of her grandfather in her works.

In 2021, she moved beyond pottery to create with new materials, including plaster, wax, and bronze.

In 2022, Noha held her first solo exhibition, ‘Uprooting, re-rooting: Matter and Construction of the self’, in Bordeaux. Today, Noha's work is found in the permanent collections of the Victoria & Albert Museum, the Crafts Council, Nottingham Castle Museum and Art Gallery, and the National Museum of Scotland.

=== Activism ===
Outside of her artwork, Noha is a community activist, advocating for social justice and diversity in the arts industry. She leads the London LGBTQ+ Community Centre and is a co-director of Lon-art Creative, a social activism organization for creatives. Noha also works with Design Can, an initiative advocating for more inclusivity in the design industry.

== Collections and exhibitions ==
- 2019 – London and Edinburgh Art Fairs
- 2021 – OFF – Focus Céramiques d'art', Bordeaux, France
- 2021 – Maker’s Eye, Craft Council and Atherton Green Art Gallery, Hampshire
- 2022 – Body Vessel Clay: Black Women, Ceramics and Contemporary Art, at Two Temple Place and York Art Gallery
- 2022-23 – Uprooting, re-rooting: Matter and Construction of the self, Solo Exhibition, Galerie REVEL, Bordeaux
- 2023 – Solo Exhibition, Unit London
- 2024 – Miradas ecofeministas en el arte ecuatoguineano at the Spanish Cultural Centres in Bata and Malabo, Equatorial Guinea
- 2025 – Artist's Residency G.A.S. Foundation, Lagos
