= Palm Cabaret and Bar =

Performance venue and bar in Puerto Vallarta, Jalisco, Mexico

- Logo

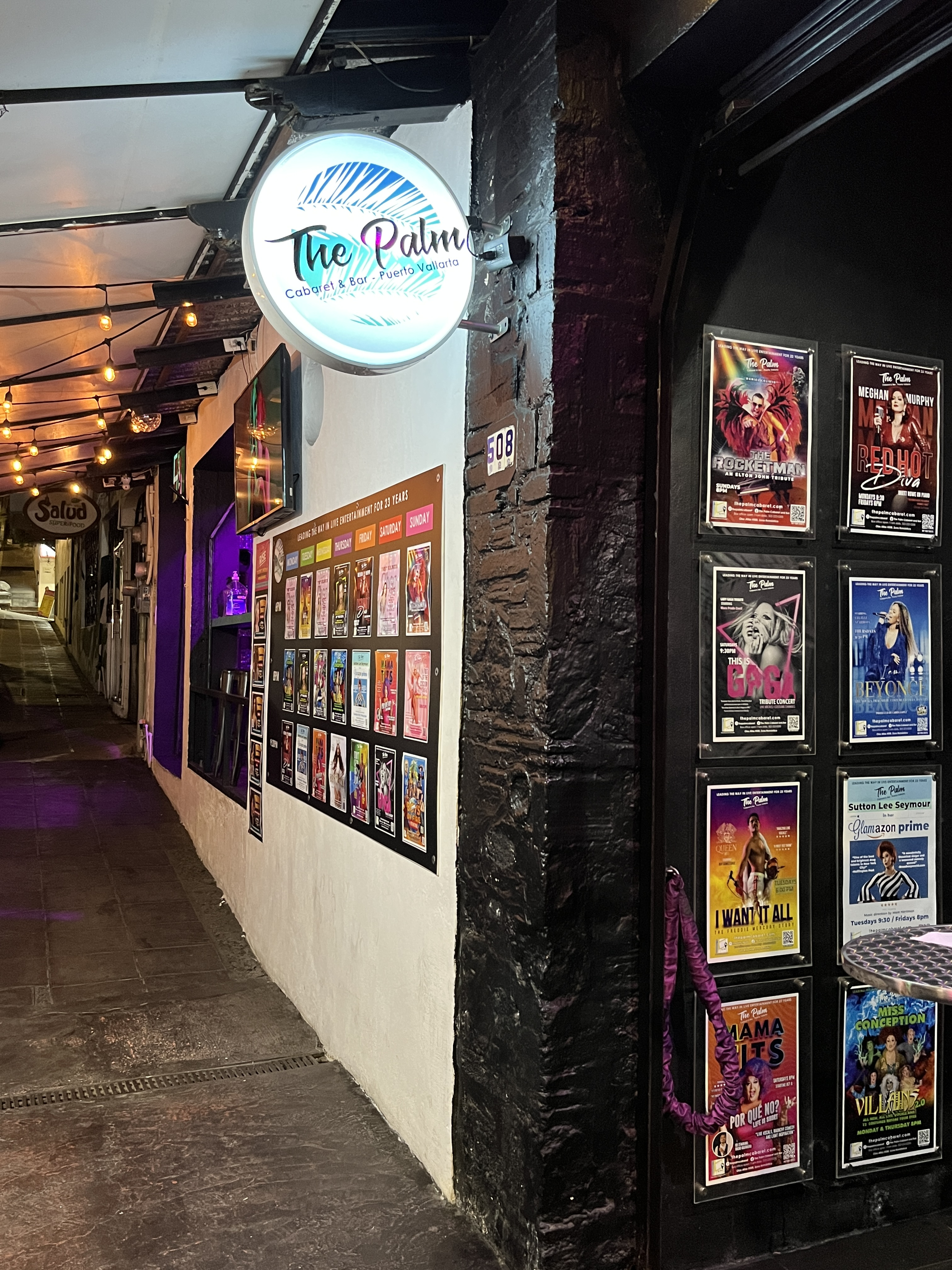
- Venue exterior, 2023
- Interactive map of Palm Cabaret and Bar
- Address: Olas Altas 508; Puerto Vallarta, Jalisco; Mexico
- Coordinates: 20.6001°N 105.2375°W

Construction
- Opened: 1999

The Palm Cabaret and Bar (sometimes abbreviated as The Palm) is a bar and performance venue in Zona Romántica, Puerto Vallarta, in the Mexican state of Jalisco.

== Description ==
The venue hosts a variety of comedy, music, and theater acts. According to Frommer's, "In 2013, the Palm underwent a much needed renovation and now, finally, the venue is as good as the performers (heck, even the bathrooms are clean). The nightly show uses performers from across the Americas ... and covers a broad array of genres from drag acts (such as Damn Edna) to musical groups, like Well Strung, classical musicians who also play Lady Gaga. There are two shows nightly, and sometimes a matinee. The crowd is mostly gay, but straights won't feel out of place if they come (the management and patrons are a tolerant bunch)."

== History ==
The venue was established in 1999. Gustavo Gomez is a co-owner.

Coco Peru, Mama Tits, Spencer Day, and Well-Strung have performed at the venue. Shows have included:

- Back to Basics
- Beginnings
- The Boy Band Project
- Dueling Drag Divas
- I Feel Love, a tribute to Sam Smith
- I Want It All: The Freddie Mercury Story
- MexiQueer
- Queen Live Forever, a tribute to Queen
- This Is Gaga, a tribute to Lady Gaga

== Reception ==
Frommer's has rated the venue 2 out of 3 stars.
