= List of LGBTQ holders of political offices in New Zealand =

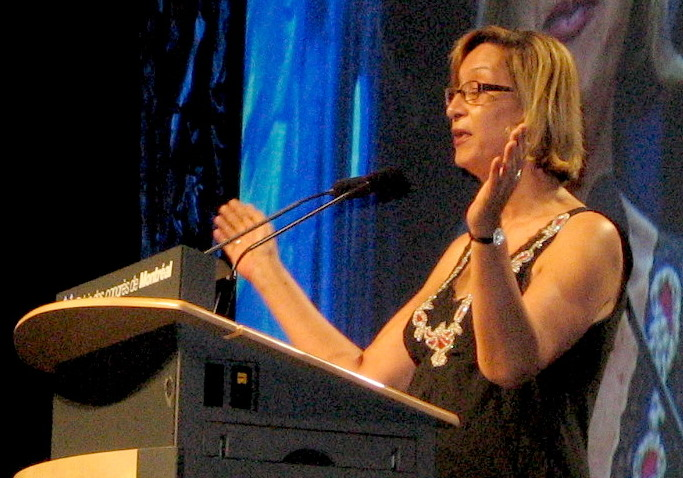
Georgina Beyer was the first openly transgender mayor and Member of Parliament in the world

This is a list of LGBTQIA+ (lesbian, gay, bisexual, transgender and intersex) holders of political offices in New Zealand.

Charles Mackay, who served as Mayor of Whanganui for a non-consecutive period from 1906 to 1920, is the first known gay mayor. Mackay resigned from his position in 1920 after the attempted murder of poet D'Arcy Cresswell, who allegedly blackmailed him and threatened to publicly expose his homosexuality. Most mentions of Mackay were removed from Whanganui due to the controversy, including having streets renamed, his official portrait removed, and his name sanded off the foundation stone of the Sarjeant Gallery. The first openly lesbian councillor in New Zealand was Margaret Magill, who served on the Eastbourne Borough Council from 1931 for around 30 years, including as deputy mayor of Eastbourne.

The first known LGBTQIA+ member of the New Zealand Parliament was Marilyn Waring, who served in parliament from 1975 to 1984. Waring was outed by the press in 1975, but openly acknowledged her sexual orientation only after leaving parliament. The first openly LGBTQIA+ politician was Chris Carter, who was elected to the Te Atatū electorate in 1993, serving until 2010. Carter and Tim Barnett established Rainbow Labour, the LGBT branch within the New Zealand Labour Party, in 1997.

Georgina Beyer became the world's first openly transgender mayor in 1995, when she became the Mayor of Carterton. Beyer later represented Wairarapa in the New Zealand Parliament from 1999 to 2005, becoming the world's first openly transgender Member of Parliament.

After the 2020 New Zealand general election, the New Zealand parliament had thirteen openly LGBTQIA+ MPs, making it the country with the highest proportion of LGBTQIA+ politicians serving in government in the world. Currently, there are eleven LGBTQIA+ MPs in the New Zealand parliament.

Grant Robertson is the longest serving LGBTQIA+ member of parliament, having been elected in 2008. Robertson served as the first LGBTQIA+ Deputy Prime Minister of New Zealand from 2020 to 2023, and was the first openly gay deputy prime minister in New Zealand.

== Members of Parliament ==
Name	Image	Party	Seat	Term in Office		Notes
Marilyn Waring		National Party	Raglan	1975	1978	Outed by a tabloid newspaper in 1976, Waring openly acknowledged her sexual orientation after leaving parliament.
Marilyn Waring		National Party	Waipa	1978	1984	Outed by a tabloid newspaper in 1976, Waring openly acknowledged her sexual orientation after leaving parliament.
Chris Carter		Labour Party	Te Atatū	1993	2010	First openly gay member of Parliament, and cofounder of Rainbow Labour.
Chris Carter		Independent	Te Atatū	2010	2011	First openly gay member of Parliament, and cofounder of Rainbow Labour.
Tim Barnett		Labour Party	Christchurch Central	1996	2008	Cofounder of Rainbow Labour.
Georgina Beyer		Labour Party	Wairarapa	1999	2005	First openly transgender Member of Parliament in the world, and first takatāpui Member of Parliament.
Chris Finlayson		National Party	List	2005	2019	First openly gay member of parliament for a right-wing party.
Maryan Street		Labour Party	List	2005	2014	First openly lesbian Member of Parliament.
Charles Chauvel		Labour Party	List	2006	2013	
Grant Robertson		Labour Party	Wellington Central	2008	2023	First openly gay deputy prime minister in New Zealand.
Grant Robertson		Labour Party	List	2023	2024	First openly gay deputy prime minister in New Zealand.
Louisa Wall		Labour Party	List	2008	2008	Wall introduced the Marriage (Definition of Marriage) Amendment Act 2013, which made same-sex marriage legal in New Zealand.
Louisa Wall		Labour Party	List	2011	2011	Wall introduced the Marriage (Definition of Marriage) Amendment Act 2013, which made same-sex marriage legal in New Zealand.
Louisa Wall		Labour Party	Manurewa	2011	2020	Wall introduced the Marriage (Definition of Marriage) Amendment Act 2013, which made same-sex marriage legal in New Zealand.
Louisa Wall		Labour Party	List	2020	2022	Wall introduced the Marriage (Definition of Marriage) Amendment Act 2013, which made same-sex marriage legal in New Zealand.
Kevin Hague		Green Party	List	2011	2016	
Jan Logie		Green Party	List	2011	2023	
Paul Foster-Bell		National Party	List	2013	2017	
Claudette Hauiti		National Party	List	2013	2014	
Meka Whaitiri		Labour Party	Ikaroa-Rāwhiti	2013	2023	First LGBT Māori electorate MP.
Meka Whaitiri		Independent	Ikaroa-Rāwhiti	2023	2023	First LGBT Māori electorate MP.
Tāmati Coffey		Labour Party	Waiariki	2017	2020	
Tāmati Coffey		Labour Party	List	2020	2023	
Kiri Allan		Labour Party	List	2017	2020	
Kiri Allan		Labour Party	East Coast	2020	2023	
Chlöe Swarbrick		Green Party	List	2017	2020	First LGBT leader of a parliamentary party.
Chlöe Swarbrick		Green Party	Auckland Central	2020	Present	First LGBT leader of a parliamentary party.
Glen Bennett		Labour Party	New Plymouth	2020	2023	
Glen Bennett		Labour Party	List	2024	Present	
Shanan Halbert		Labour Party	Northcote	2020	2023	
Shanan Halbert		Labour Party	List	2024	Present	
Tangi Utikere		Labour Party	Palmerston North	2020	Present	
Ayesha Verrall		Labour Party	List	2020	Present	
Elizabeth Kerekere		Green Party	List	2020	2023	
Elizabeth Kerekere		Independent	List	2023	2023	
Ricardo Menéndez March		Green Party	List	2020	Present	
Kahurangi Carter		Green Party	List	2023	Present	
Todd Stephenson		ACT	List	2023	Present	
Lawrence Xu-Nan		Green Party	List	2024	Present	
Benjamin Doyle		Green Party	List	2024	2025	
Georgie Dansey		Labour Party	List	2026	2026	
James Christmas		ACT	List	2026	Present	
Rohan O'Neill-Stevens		Green Party	List	2026	Present	

== Mayors ==
- Georgina Beyer – Mayor of Carterton (1995–1999)
- Charles Mackay – Mayor of Wanganui (1906–1912, 1912–1913, 1915–1920)
- Jenny Rowan – Mayor of Inglewood District (1986–1989), Mayor of Kāpiti Coast (2007–2013)

== Councillors ==
- Steve Broad – Invercargill City Council (2023–present)
- Jacquie Grant – Grey District Council (1998–2004)
- Richard Hills – Auckland Council (2016–present)
- Margaret Magill – Eastbourne Borough Council (1931–1950s)
- Teri O'Neill - Wellington City Council (2019–2025)
- Rohan O'Neill-Stevens - Nelson City Council (2019–2025)

== See also ==
- Stephen Berry – right-wing perennial candidate, running from 2002 to 2020.
- Damian Light – while not entering parliament, Light became the first openly gay leader of a political party in New Zealand in 2017.
- Heather Simpson – chief of staff for Prime Minister Helen Clark, who stood for election in 1987 and 1993.
- List of the first LGBT holders of political offices
