= Unicorn (Seattle) =

Bar and restaurant in Seattle, Washington, U.S.

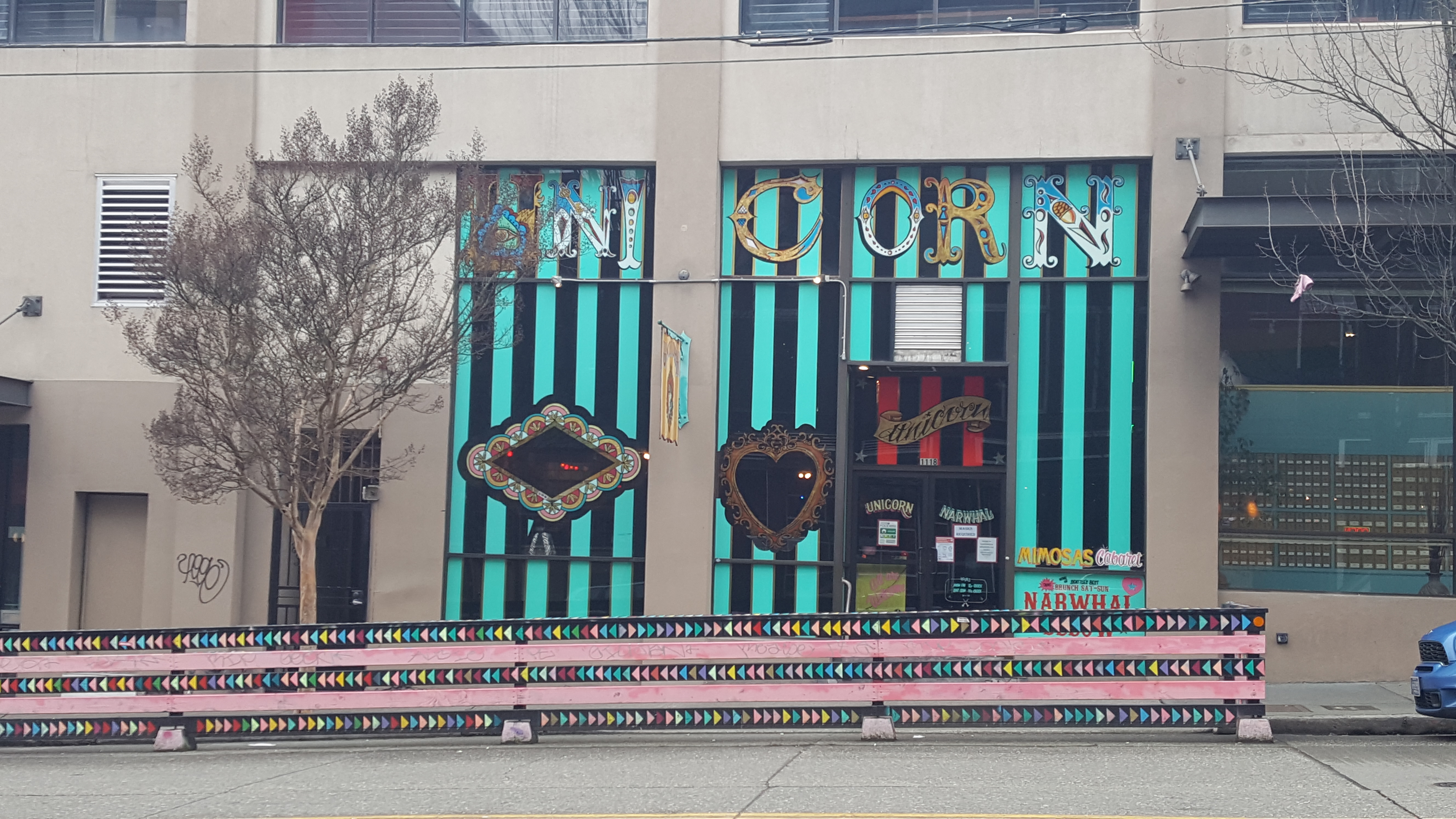
- The bar's exterior, 2012
- Interactive map of Unicorn

Restaurant information
- Location: Seattle, Washington, United States
- Coordinates: 47°36′51.3″N 122°19′2.3″W

Unicorn (sometimes Unicorn Bar) is a bar and restaurant on Seattle's Capitol Hill, in the United States.

== Description ==
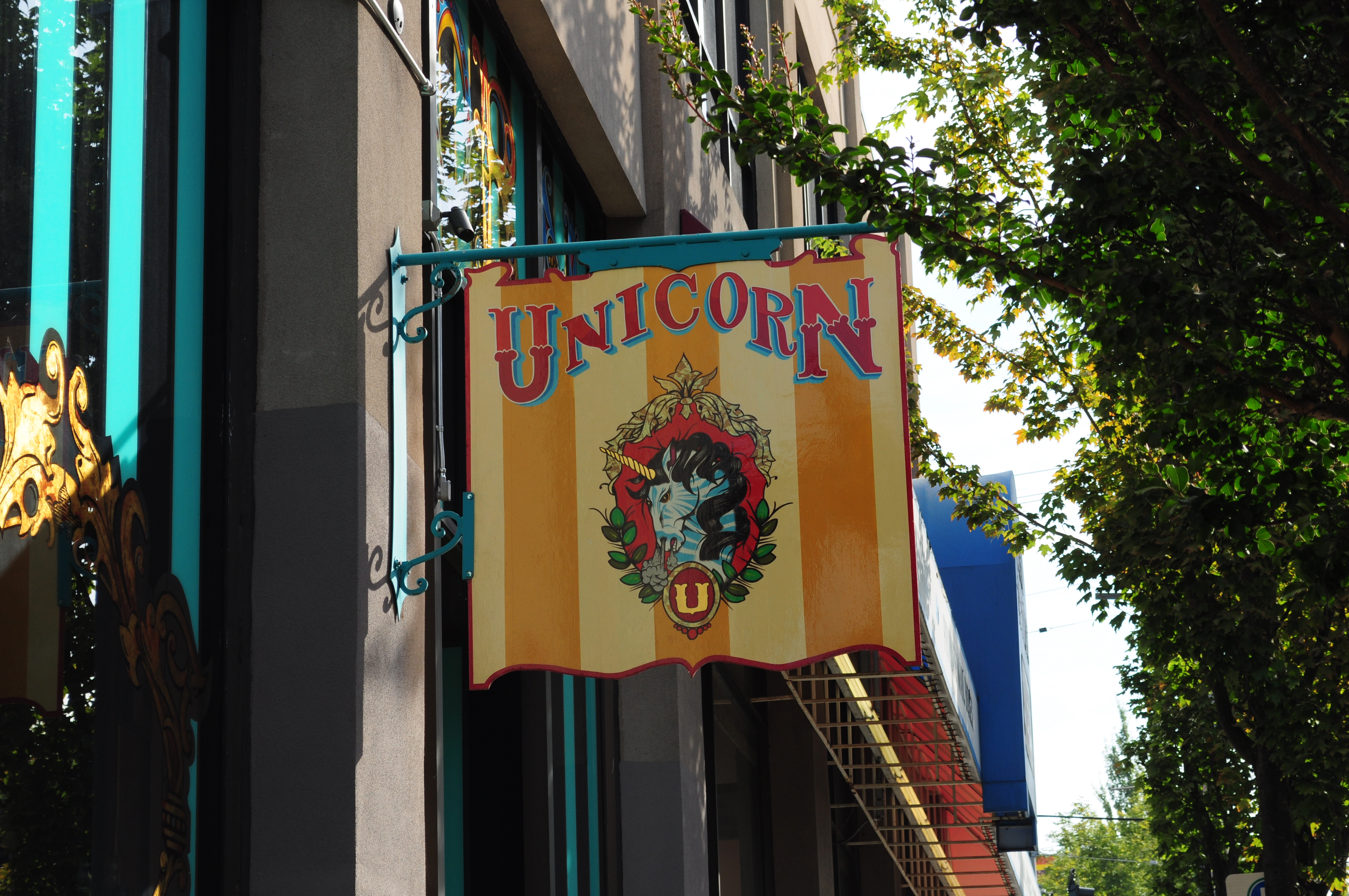
Sign, 2022

The bar Unicorn, located on Seattle's Capitol Hill, has been described by Eater Seattle's Gabe Guarente as a "French circus-arcade-and-Jello-shot destination". Unicorn has a "downstairs sibling" called Narwhal. Thrillist has described Unicorn as a "ridiculously high-concept French-circus-styled drinkery with vividly striped walls and zebra patterned/faux-period furniture", with a Sunday brunch buffet and drag variety show called Mimosas with Momma. In 2019, Time Out's Olivia Hall described Unicorn as a "trippy", "circus-themed place" worth visiting, but "not really a local hangout". She described the interior as "drenched in wild colors with an impressive collection of animal heads that watch your every move".

Unicorn and Narwhal both serve carnival foods such as corndogs, funnel cake, popcorn, and "unicorn balls" (fried pork balls with ginger and jalapeño). Cocktails on the drink menu include the Cereal Killer (Froot Loop vodka, Rumchata, Sprite, grenadine) and the Fantasy Island (brown sugar bourbon, cream soda, orange soda).

== History ==
Unicorn opened in January 2010, replacing the Satellite Lounge. Narwhal opened in 2012.

Adam Heimstadt co-owns Unicorn, as of 2010–2020. Mama Tits has performed at the venue.

Unicorn and Narwhal both closed for months during the COVID-19 pandemic, but re-opened with limited seating, a smaller menu, and no arcade games in September 2020.

In 2025, the building that houses Unicorn caught fire.

== Unicorn Two in White Center ==
An "offshoot" of Unicorn called the Unicorn Two in White Center is under construction, as of 2020.

== Reception ==
Thrillist's Kevin Schlittenhardt included Unicorn and Narwal in his 2017 list of "The Wackiest Themed Bars in the World". Olivia Hall of TimeOut ranked Unicorn number 13 in her 2019 list of the city's 19 best bars.
