= Mama Tits =

American drag performer and entertainer

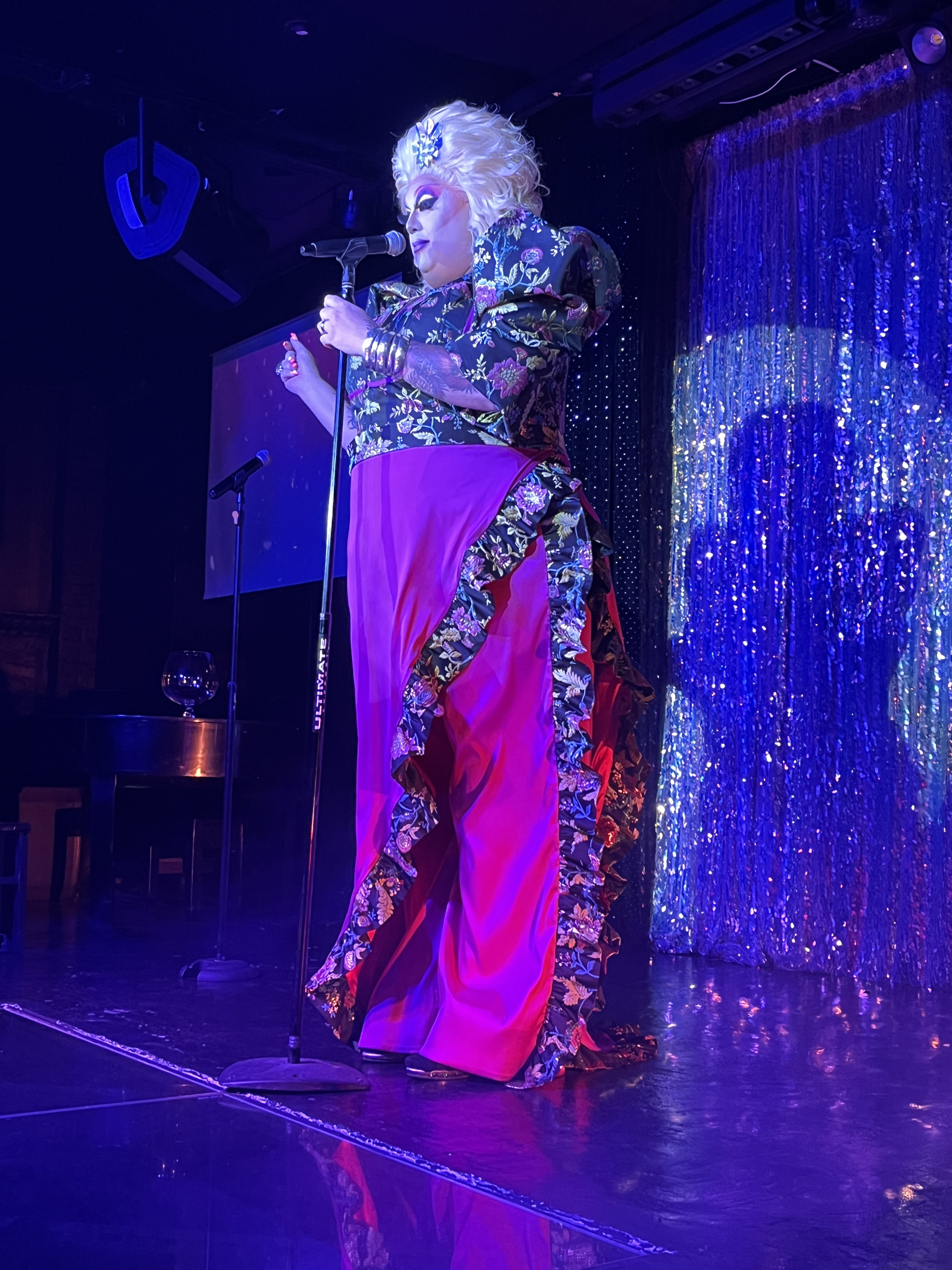
- Mama Tits performing at Puerto Vallarta's Palm Cabaret and Bar in 2023
- Born: Brian Daniel Peters
- Occupations: Drag queen; comedian; singer

Mama Tits is the stage name of Brian Daniel Peters, an American drag performer.

== Career ==
Mama Tits has been described as a "singer, storyteller and comedian". According to Joseph Brand of Seattle Spectator, she's also a performer, event hostess, and life coach. In Seattle, Mama Tits has hosted drag brunch at Unicorn. She was featured in the comic book Mama Tits Saves the World, which according to Jennifer Campbell of The Stranger "immortalizes the moment at Seattle Pride 2014 when she faced down a group of hate-spewing antigay protesters with her steely spine and wicked humor". A video of the incident was viewed 1.8 million times, as of November 2015. Covering the confrontation, Bustle's Elizabeth Ballou called Mama Tits "our new gay pride hero".

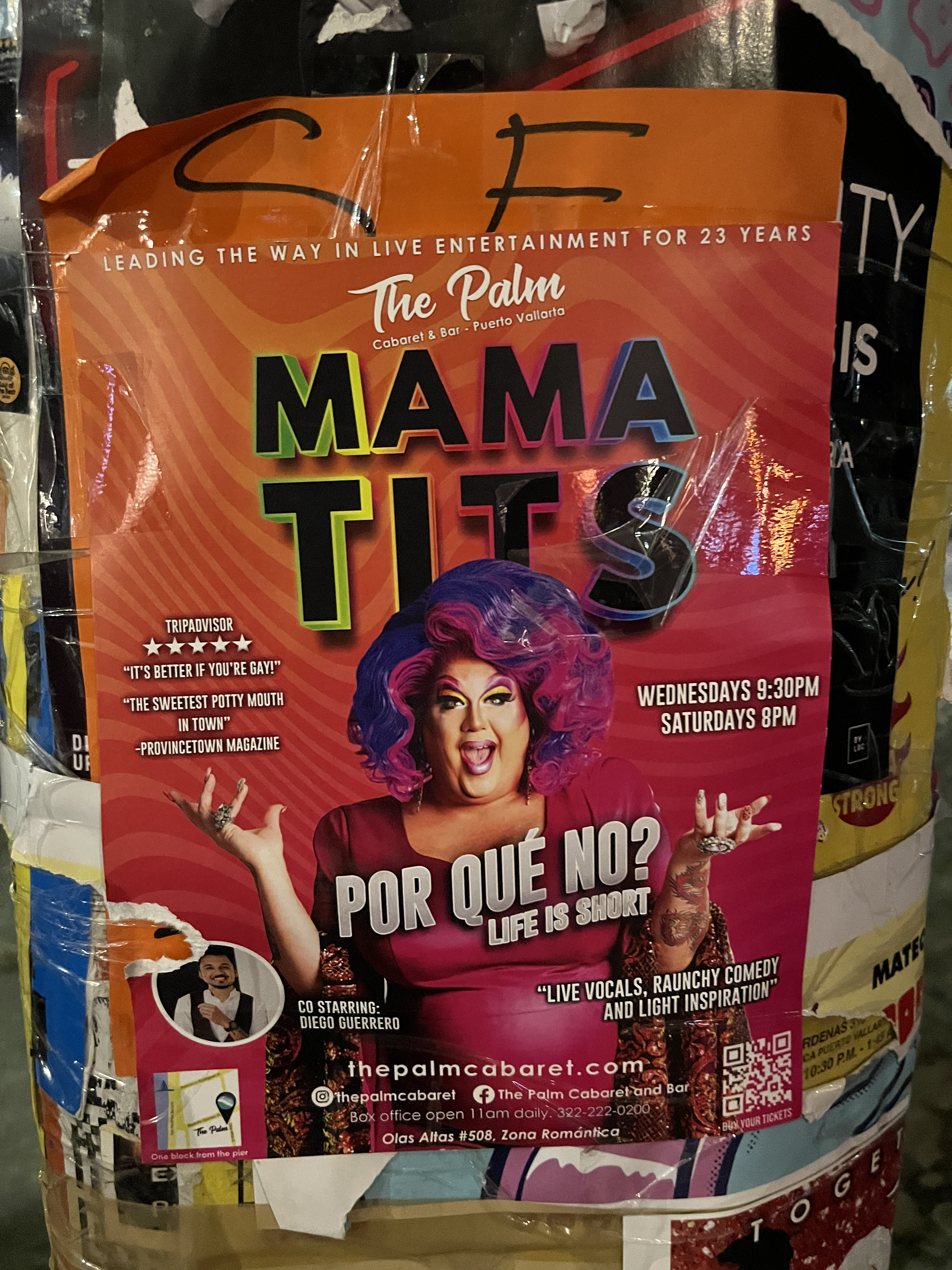
Poster for her show Por Qué No? – Life Is Short

Mama Tits has hosted a show called Sweet Like Candy. As of 2016, she hosted the drag brunch show Mimosas with Mama in Seattle. Her show Mayhem with Mama was held for one night at The Triple Door in 2016, before continuing in Puerto Vallarta. Her other shows in Puerto Vallarta have included Mama Tits Triple D at The Red Room and Mama Tits: Big and Loud at Act II. As of 2022, Palm Cabaret and Bar hosts her show Por Qué No? – Life Is Short.

== Personal life ==
Peters began exploring drag as a teenager in Nampa, Idaho, and joined the Sisters of Perpetual Indulgence at the age of 24. He is married and lives in Puerto Vallarta, as of 2019.

== See also ==
- LGBTQ culture in Puerto Vallarta
- List of drag queens
- List of LGBTQ people from Seattle
