= Maximilian Böltl =

German politician (born 1983)

Member of the Landtag of Bavaria
- Incumbent
- Assumed office 30 October 2023
- Preceded by: Ernst Weidenbusch
- Constituency: München-Land-Nord

Personal details
- Born: 6 June 1983 (age 43)
- Party: Christian Social Union (since 1998)

Maximilian Böltl (born 6 June 1983) is a German politician serving as a member of the Landtag of Bavaria since 2023. From 2014 to 2023, he served as mayor of Kirchheim bei München.
