= Sabine Jünger =

German politician (born 1973)

Jutta Oesterle-Schwerin

Member of the Bundestag
- In office 1998–2002

Personal details
- Born: 21 May 1973 (age 53) Königs Wusterhausen
- Party: The Left Party.PDS

Sabine Jünger (born 21 May 1973, in Königs Wusterhausen) is a German politician for The Left Party.PDS.

Jünger studied theology and changed to legal science in Berlin in 1992. She started political work in 1991, while still in school. In 1992, Jünger became a member of The Left Party.PDS. In 1994, she was elected to the parliament of Mecklenburg-Vorpommern. In the federal elections in 1998 she was elected to the Bundestag, where she was a member until 2002.

Jünger is openly lesbian and has one child. She is an atheist.
