= List of LGBTQ people from San Francisco =

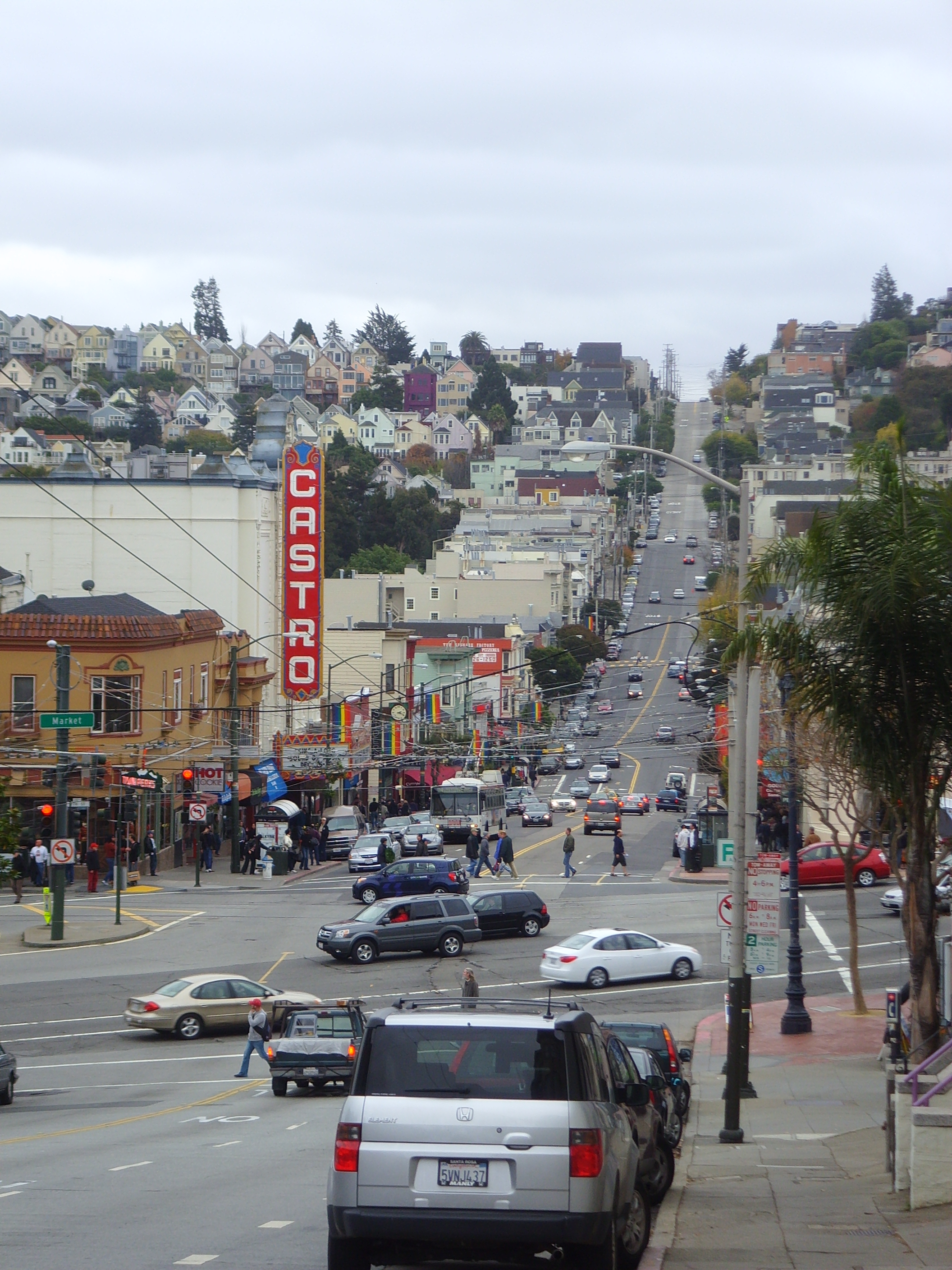
The Castro, the center of LGBT culture in San Francisco

The LGBTQ community in San Francisco is one of the largest and most prominent LGBTQ communities in the United States. In the 1970s, the city's gay male population rose from 30,000 at the beginning of the decade to 100,000 in a city of 660,000 at the end of the decade. In 1993 Stephen O. Murray, in "Components of Gay Community in San Francisco," wrote that most LGBTQ residents of San Francisco had originated from other cities and had "come out" in other cities.

A 2015 Gallup poll found that 6.2% of San Francisco-Oakland-Hayward inhabitants identified as LGBT, the highest of any metropolitan area in the United States. In the city of San Francisco itself, a 2006 survey found that 15.4% of its inhabitants identified as LGBT. In U.S. Congressional District 8, which consists of San Franciscans of voting age, 16.6% of adults identify as LGBT.

This list includes people born or raised in the San Francisco metropolitan area, as well as those who originated their careers there.

== Activists ==
- Lisa Ben
- Harry Britt
- Cecilia Chung
- Angela Davis
- Felicia Elizondo
- Janetta Johnson
- Cleve Jones
- Bill Kraus
- Marsha H. Levine
- Del Martin and Phyllis Lyon
- Isa Noyola
- Christina Olague
- Aria Sa'id
- Jose Sarria
- Mia Satya
- Adela Vazquez
- Merle Woo

== Art ==
=== Actors ===
- Aleshia Brevard
- Charlie Carver
- Dick Clair
- Lea DeLaria
- Rodney Kageyama
- Alec Mapa
- Aubrey O'Day
- Vincent Rodriguez III
- Alicia Sixtos
- Ione Skye
- Zelda Williams
- BD Wong

=== Comedians ===
- Scott Capurro
- Margaret Cho
- Hannah Hart
- David Mills

=== Crafters ===
- Kaffe Fassett

=== Dancers ===
- Sean Dorsey

=== Drag ===
- Peaches Christ
- Heklina
- Honey Mahogany
- Charles Pierce
- Bebe Sweetbriar

=== Fashion ===
- William Ware Theiss
- Kaisik Wong

=== Filmmakers ===
- Esther Eng
- Savannah Knoop

=== Illustrators ===
- Rex

=== Musicians ===
- Jessica Bejarano
- Michael Tilson Thomas
- Linda Tillery
- Remi Wolf

=== Painters ===
- Tauba Auerbach
- Bernice Bing
- Lenore Chinn
- Jess
- Anna Elizabeth Klumpke
- Martin Wong

=== Photographers ===
- Lenn Keller
- Mia Nakano

=== Poets ===
- Robert Duncan

=== Singers ===
- Sylvester

== Athletes ==
=== Figure skating ===
- Brian Boitano
- Rudy Galindo

=== Wrestlers ===
- Gabbi Tuft

== Businesspeople ==
- Sam Altman
- Todd B. Hawley
- Chuck Holmes
- Bradford Shellhammer
- Theresa Sparks
- Rikki Streicher

== Chefs ==
- Elka Gilmore
- Melissa King

== Lawyers ==
- Fay Stender

== Politics ==
- Roberta Achtenberg
- Tom Ammiano
- David Campos
- Bevan Dufty
- Rebecca Kaplan
- Anne Kronenberg
- Mark Leno
- Rafael Mandelman
- Carole Migden
- Harvey Milk
- Jeff Sheehy
- Scott Wiener

== Pornography ==
- Venus Lux
- Al Parker
- Dylan Ryan
- Madison Young

== Religion ==
- Megan Rohrer

== Writers ==
- Jack Bee Garland
- Gil Hovav
- David Lourea
- Armistead Maupin
- Toni Newman
- Carol Queen
- Randy Shilts
- Steve Silberman
- Michelle Tea
- Alice B. Toklas
- Lidia Yuknavitch
