= List of LGBTQ people from Seattle =

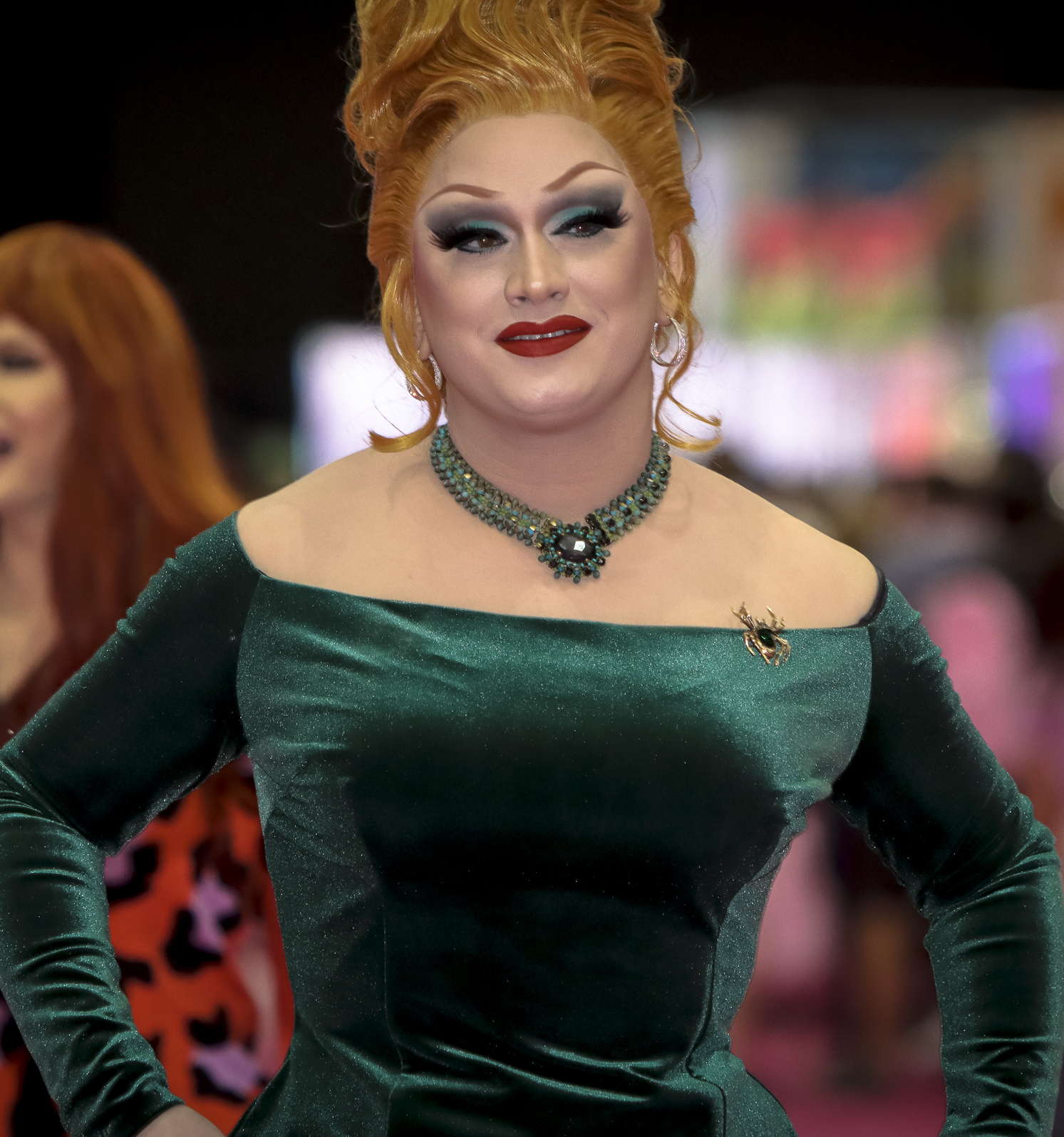
Jinkx Monsoon

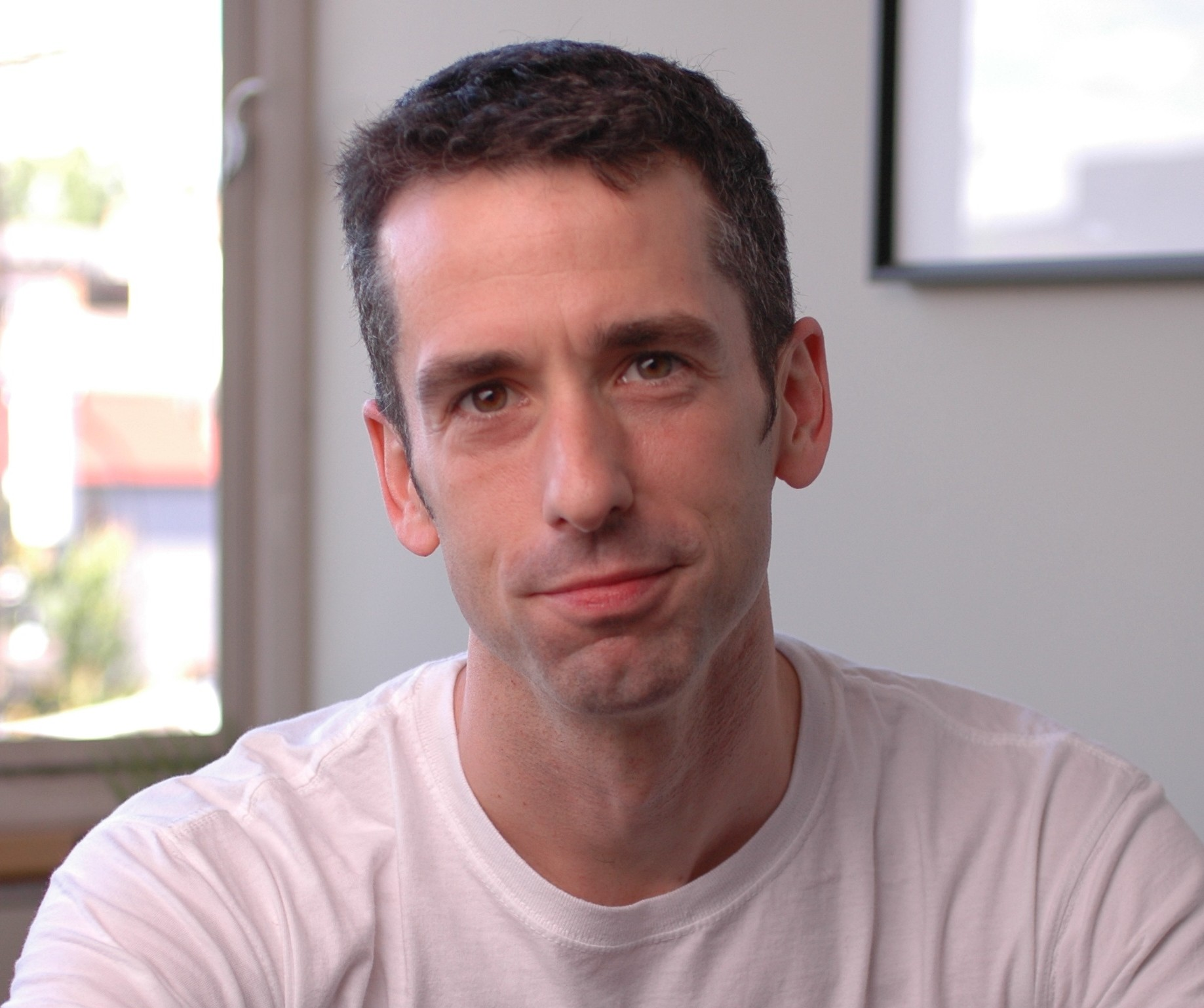
Dan Savage in 2005

Notable LGBTQ people from Seattle, in the U.S. state of Washington, include:

- Arrietty, drag performer
- Faygele Ben-Miriam, activist
- BenDeLaCreme, drag queen
- Bosco, drag performer
- Carrie Brownstein, musical artist, actor, and author
- Brandi Carlile, musician
- Abrahm DeVine, swimmer
- Jenny Durkan, former United States attorney; mayor of Seattle 2017–2021; first female mayor since the 1920s
- Michael Hadreas, musician
- Rebecca Heineman, video game programmer
- Irene Dubois, drag performer
- Gretchen Kalonji, materials scientist, professor, and academic administrator
- Mama Tits, drag performer and entertainer
- Mary Lambert, singer
- Mattilda Bernstein Sycamore, author and activist
- Jinkx Monsoon, drag queen and singer
- Ed Murray, Seattle mayor 2015–2017
- Dylan Orr, government official
- Clyde Petersen, filmmaker and musician
- W. H. Pugmire, performer and writer
- Megan Rapinoe, professional athlete
- Robbie Turner, drag queen
- Dan Savage, writer and activist
- Waxie Moon, performer
