= Rainbow Labour =

LGBT wing of the New Zealand Labour Party

Rainbow Labour Reipa Āniwaniwa (Māori)
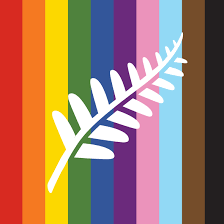
- Headquarters: Wellington, New Zealand
- Ideology: Social democracy LGBT rights
- Mother party: New Zealand Labour Party

Rainbow Labour is the LGBT+ sector of the New Zealand Labour Party.

== History ==
Rainbow Labour began as a branch within Chris Carter's Auckland Waipareira electorate on 17 March 1997 following his narrow defeat in the election the previous year. That same year, Tim Barnett, newly elected to Parliament as an openly gay man, established a Rainbow Special Branch in Christchurch on 3 October 1997. During the next few years the branches expanded in size, with the Auckland branch becoming one of the largest in the Labour Party. This led to the formation of a Rainbow Sector within the Labour Party, which gave the branches a nationwide focus and co-ordinating body. In 2004, at a vote at the Party's Annual Conference, Rainbow Labour was invited to nominate candidates for a permanent representative position elected from the floor of Conference, on the Party's controlling body, the New Zealand Council.

== Rainbow Caucus ==
Rainbow Members of Parliament (MPs) work closely with Rainbow Labour, and has included gay men Chris Carter, Tim Barnett, and lesbian MP Maryan Street, and transgender MP Georgina Beyer. During 2006 Charles Chauvel became an MP when a vacancy arose; similarly Louisa Wall entered Parliament in 2008 following a resignation (although she was not re-elected at the general election later that year), and Grant Robertson was elected as the MP for Wellington Central in 2008. Louisa Wall re-entered Parliament on the resignation of Darren Hughes in 2011, and left in 2022. As of 2024, MPs in Rainbow Caucus include Hon Dr Ayesha Verrall, Shanan Halbert who entered after Grant Robertson stepped down in 2024, Tangi Utikere, and Glen Bennett.

== Policies and issues ==
Issues Rainbow Labour has advanced within the Labour Party have included relationship property reform, human rights reforms, the Civil Union Act, which was passed in 2004, and the Marriage (Definition of Marriage) Amendment Bill which passed in April 2013 and was brought to Parliament via a Members Bill under Louisa Wall's name.

On 15 February 2022, the Conversion Practices Prohibition Legislation Bill passed its third and final reading. The Bill was brought to Parliament as a result of a joint petition presented by Young Greens and Young Labour on 14 August 2018. That petition initially resulted in a Members Bill placed in the ballot by Labour MP Marja Lubeck. Rainbow Labour submitted evidence in support of the legislation at the Select Committee process.

In elections since 1999, the Labour Party has published pamphlets advertising Labour's LGBTQIA+ candidates. This is thought to be a world first by a mainstream national political party. The Party later began including rainbow policies in its manifesto, which in 2020, included banning conversion therapy, better access, support and treatment through the health system, more funding for rainbow mental health services, and creating more inclusive school and work environments.

== See also ==
- Human rights in New Zealand
- Intersex rights in New Zealand
- LGBTQ people in New Zealand
- LGBTQ rights in New Zealand
- Transgender rights in New Zealand
