= List of openly LGBTQ sub-national leaders =

Politicians openly identifying themselves as members of the LGBTQ community have served as sub-national leaders.

== Sub-national leaders ==
Denotes incumbent head of sub-national government

Name	Portrait	Entity	Country	Office	Political party	Mandate start	Mandate end	Term length	Sexual orientation/ gender identity
Don Dunstan		South Australia	Australia	Premier	Labor Party	1 June 1967	17 April 1968	321 days	Bisexual
Don Dunstan		South Australia	Australia	Premier	Labor Party	2 June 1970	15 February 1979	8 years, 258 days	Bisexual
Jerónimo Saavedra (Note: Publicly came out after retirement, although while being a senator.)		Canary Islands	Spain	President	Socialist Workers' Party	29 November 1982	4 July 1987	4 years, 217 days	Gay
Jerónimo Saavedra		Canary Islands	Spain	President	Socialist Workers' Party	11 July 1991	2 April 1993	1 year, 265 days	Gay
Gustavo Álvarez Gardeazábal		Valle del Cauca	Colombia	Governor	Independent	1 January 1998	27 July 1999	1 year, 207 days	Gay
Elio Di Rupo		Wallonia	Belgium	Minister-President	Socialist Party	15 July 1999	4 April 2000	264 days	Gay
Elio Di Rupo		Wallonia	Belgium	Minister-President	Socialist Party	6 October 2005	20 July 2007	1 year, 287 days	Gay
Elio Di Rupo		Wallonia	Belgium	Minister-President	Socialist Party	13 September 2019	15 July 2024	4 years, 306 days	Gay
Jan Franssen		South Holland	Netherlands	King's Commissioner	People's Party for Freedom and Democracy	3 May 2000	1 January 2014	13 years, 243 days	Gay
Erling Lae		Vestfold	Norway	Governor	Conservative Party	1 June 2010	30 June 2016	6 years, 29 days	Gay
Klaus Wowereit		Berlin	Germany	Governing Mayor	Social Democratic Party	16 June 2001	11 December 2014	13 years, 178 days	Gay
Ole von Beust		Hamburg	Germany	First Mayor	Christian Democratic Union	31 October 2001	25 August 2010	8 years, 298 days	Gay
Jim McGreevey		New Jersey	United States	Governor	Democratic Party	15 January 2002	15 November 2004	2 years, 305 days	Gay
Nichi Vendola		Apulia	Italy	President	Communist Refoundation Party	4 April 2005	1 June 2015	10 years, 58 days	Gay
Clemens Cornielje		Gelderland	Netherlands	King's Commissioner	People's Party for Freedom and Democracy	31 August 2005	6 February 2019	13 years, 159 days	Gay
Bernhard Pulver		Bern	Switzerland	Member of the Executive Council	Green Party	1 June 2006	31 May 2018	11 years, 364 days	Gay
Lynne Brown		Western Cape	South Africa	Premier	African National Congress	25 July 2008	6 May 2009	315 days	Lesbian
Allan Bell		Isle of Man	United Kingdom	Chief Minister	Independent	11 October 2011	4 October 2016	4 years, 359 days	Gay
Martin Klöti		St. Gallen	Switzerland	Member of the Executive Council	The Liberals	1 June 2012	31 May 2020	7 years, 365 days	Gay
Cian O'Callaghan		Fingal	Ireland	Mayor	Labour Party	22 June 2012	15 June 2013	358 days	Gay
Rosario Crocetta		Sicily	Italy	President	Democratic Party	10 November 2012	18 November 2017	5 years, 8 days	Gay
Kathleen Wynne		Ontario	Canada	Premier	Liberal Party	11 February 2013	29 June 2018	5 years, 116 days	Lesbian
Fintan Warfield		South Dublin	Ireland	Mayor	Sinn Féin	6 June 2014	25 June 2015	1 year, 19 days	Gay
Andrew Barr		Australian Capital Territory	Australia	Chief Minister	Labor Party	11 December 2014	Incumbent	11 years, 237 days	Gay
Kate Brown		Oregon	United States	Governor	Democratic Party	18 February 2015	9 January 2023	7 years, 325 days	Bisexual
Wade MacLauchlan		Prince Edward Island	Canada	Premier	Liberal Party	23 February 2015	9 May 2019	4 years, 75 days	Gay
Niluka Ekanayake		Central Province	Sri Lanka	Governor	Independent	17 March 2016	11 April 2018	2 years, 25 days	Trans woman
Niluka Ekanayake		Sabaragamuwa Province	Sri Lanka	Governor	Independent	12 April 2018	31 December 2018	263 days	Trans woman
Arno Brok		Friesland	Netherlands	King's Commissioner	People's Party for Freedom and Democracy	1 March 2017	Incumbent	9 years, 157 days	Gay
Andy Street		West Midlands	United Kingdom	Mayor	Conservative Party	8 May 2017	5 May 2024	6 years, 363 days	Gay
Thierry Apothéloz		Geneva	Switzerland	Member of the Council of State	Social Democratic Party	1 June 2018	Incumbent	8 years, 65 days	Gay
Eduardo Leite		Rio Grande do Sul	Brazil	Governor	Social Democracy Party	1 January 2019	31 March 2022	3 years, 89 days	Gay
Eduardo Leite		Rio Grande do Sul	Brazil	Governor	Social Democracy Party	1 January 2023	Incumbent	3 years, 216 days	Gay
Fátima Bezerra		Rio Grande do Norte	Brazil	Governor	Workers' Party	1 January 2019	Incumbent	7 years, 216 days	Lesbian
Jared Polis		Colorado	United States	Governor	Democratic Party	8 January 2019	Incumbent	7 years, 209 days	Gay
Gustavo Melella		Tierra del Fuego	Argentina	Governor	FORJA Concertation Party	17 December 2019	Incumbent	6 years, 231 days	Gay
Claudia López Hernández		Bogotá	Colombia	Mayor	Green Alliance	1 January 2020	31 December 2023	3 years, 364 days	Lesbian
Ina Adema		North Brabant	Netherlands	King's Commissioner	People's Party for Freedom and Democracy	1 October 2020	Incumbent	5 years, 308 days	Lesbian
Bent Høie		Rogaland	Norway	Governor	Conservative Party	1 November 2021	Incumbent	4 years, 277 days	Gay
Emma Murphy		South Dublin	Ireland	Mayor	Fianna Fáil	24 June 2022	29 June 2023	1 year, 5 days	Lesbian
Maura Healey		Massachusetts	United States	Governor	Democratic Party	5 January 2023	Incumbent	3 years, 212 days	Lesbian
Tina Kotek		Oregon	United States	Governor	Democratic Party	9 January 2023	Incumbent	3 years, 208 days	Lesbian
Karl Love		Isle of Wight	United Kingdom	Chair	Independent	15 May 2024	Incumbent	2 years, 82 days	Gay
