= Noviercas =

- Municipality
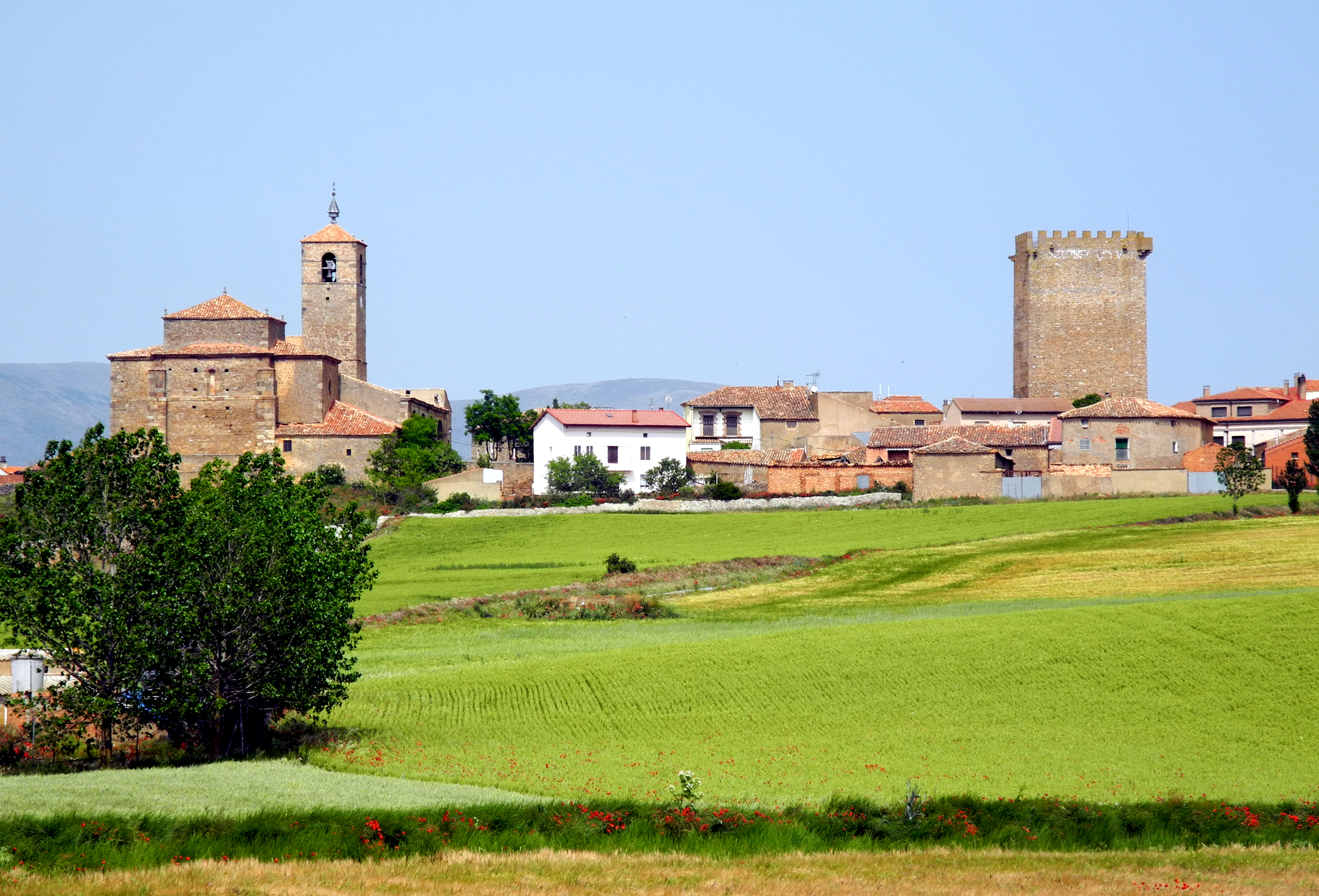
- View of Noviercas

- Coat of arms

- Location in Spain. Noviercas (Spain)
- Coordinates: 41°42′41″N 2°02′06″W
- Country: Spain
- Autonomous community: Castile and León
- Province: Soria
- Municipality: Noviercas

Area
  - Total: 85 km^{2} (33 sq mi)

Population (2025-01-01)
  - Total: 156
  - Density: 1.8/km^{2} (4.8/sq mi)
- Time zone: UTC+1 (CET)
  - Summer (DST): UTC+2 (CEST)
- Website: Official website

Noviercas is a municipality located in the province of Soria, Castile and León, Spain. According to the 2004 census (INE), the municipality has a population of 218 inhabitants.
