= London LGBTQ+ Community Centre =

Community centre in London, England

Coordinates: 51.5083°N 0.1025°W

- Interactive map of London LGBTQ+ Community Centre
- Address: 60-62 Hopton Street, Blackfriars, SE1 9JH
- Location: Southwark, London, England
- Type: Community centre

Construction
- Opened: December 2021

Website
- https://londonlgbtqcentre.org/

The London LGBTQ+ Community Centre is a community centre and venue for LGBTQ+ people in London, England, which opened in 2021. The centre hosts a range of events and activities in partnership with LGBTQ+ groups from across the city.

== History ==
In 2017 a grassroots campaign was created to establish a permanent LGBTQ+ centre in London. The following year the campaign ran a crowdfunding campaign that raised over £100,000.

In December 2021, the project opened a centre in Southwark, London. Originally intended as a six-month pop-up space, the centre announced in 2022 that they had been given an extended lease which would allow them to operate the space until at least 2027.

== See also ==
- London Lesbian and Gay Centre
- List of LGBTQ-related organizations and conferences
- Bisila Noha, artist and Centre director
