= List of LGBTQ politicians in Ireland =

The following is a list of individuals who have been elected to a political office in Ireland, who fall under the umbrella of LGBTQ identities, including gay, lesbian, bisexual and/or transgender individuals.

== Taoiseach ==
Portrait	Name	Party	Years in office	Sexual orientation/ gender identity	Notes	Ref	
	Leo Varadkar (b. 1979)	Party		Fine Gael	2007–2024	Gay	First gay Taoiseach; First gay Tánaiste; First minister to come out First openly gay TD to be elected the leader of a political party in Dáil Éireann

== Dáil Éireann ==
† Came out after serving

Portrait	Name	Party	Years in office	Sexual orientation/ gender identity	Notes	Ref	
	Pat Carey (b. 1947)	Party		Fianna Fáil	1997–2011	Gay	Served as a cabinet Minister from 2010 to 2011, came out in 2015 after his retirement
	Dominic Hannigan (b. 1965)	Labour	2011–2016	Gay	Joint first openly gay TD		
	John Lyons (b. 1977)	Labour	2011–2016	Gay	Joint first openly gay TD		
	Jerry Buttimer (b. 1967)	Fine Gael	2011–2016, 2024–	Gay	First openly gay Fine Gael TD; First serving member of the Oireachtas to come out First openly gay Cathaoirleach; First serving member of the Oireachtas to enter into a same-sex marriage		
	Katherine Zappone (b. 1953)	Independent	2016–2020	Lesbian	First openly lesbian TD; First member in a recognised same-sex relationship First openly lesbian serving cabinet minister		
	Jack Chambers (b. 1990)	Fianna Fáil	2016–	Gay	First openly gay deputy leader of Fianna Fáil		
	Cian O'Callaghan (b. 1979)	Social Democrats	2020–	Gay	First openly gay Social Democrats TD; First openly gay mayor		
	Roderic O'Gorman (b. 1981)	Green	2020–	Gay	First openly gay Green TD; First serving TD to enter into a same-sex marriage		
	Malcolm Byrne (b. 1974)	Fianna Fáil	2019–2020, 2024–	Gay	First openly gay TD elected in a by-election, and first openly gay Fianna Fáil TD		
	Ken O'Flynn	Independent Ireland	2024–	Gay	First openly gay Independent Ireland TD		
	Pádraig Rice (b. 1990)	Social Democrats	2024–	Gay			
	Conor Sheehan (b. 1993)	Labour	2024–	Gay			

== Seanad ==
Portrait	Name	Party	Years in office	Sexual orientation/ gender identity	Notes	Ref.	
	David Norris (b. 1944)	Party		Independent	1987–2024	Gay	First openly gay person elected to public office
	Colm O'Gorman (b. 1966)	Progressive Democrats	2007	Gay	First openly gay Progressive Democrats senator		
	Fintan Warfield (b. 1992)	Sinn Féin	2016–2025	Gay	First openly gay Sinn Féin senator		
	Niall Ó Donnghaile (b. 1985)	Sinn Féin	2016–2025	Gay			
	Annie Hoey (b. 1988)	Labour	2020–2025	Bisexual	First serving member of the Oireachtas to come out as bisexual		
	Mal O'Hara (b. 1979)	Green	2024–2025	Gay			
	Laura Harmon (b. 1986)	Labour	2025–	Lesbian			

== European Parliament ==
Portrait	Name	Party	Years in office	Sexual orientation/ gender identity	Notes	Ref.	
	Maria Walsh (b. 1987)	Party		Fine Gael	2019–	Lesbian	First openly lesbian Fine Gael politician

== Sub-national level ==
=== Mayors ===
Name	Party	Years in office	Sexual orientation/ gender identity	Notes	Ref.
John Moran	Party		Independent	2024–	Gay

=== Councillors ===
Name	Party	Council	Years in office	Sexual orientation/ gender identity	Notes	Ref.
Tiernan Brady	Party		Fianna Fáil	Bundoran Town Council	1999–2009	Gay
Peter Kelly	Fine Gael (Progressive Democrats until 2000)	Cork County Council	1999–2006	Gay		
Michael Sheehan	Independent (Fianna Fáil until 2024)	New Ross Town Council; Wexford County Council	1999–2009 (town council), 2009– (county council)	Gay		
Ruth Illingworth	Fianna Fáil	Mullingar Town Council	2004–2014	Lesbian	First openly gay council leader and openly gay female mayor	
Seán McKiernan	Fine Gael	Cavan County Council	2007–2014	Gay		
John Keogh	Fianna Fáil	Roscommon County Council	2009–	Gay		
David Healy	Green	Fingal County Council	2014–	Gay		
Francis Timmons	Independent (Labour in 2024)	South Dublin County Council	2014–	Gay		
Patrick McKee (b. 1988)	Fianna Fáil	Kilkenny County Council	2014–2019	Gay		
Emma Murphy	Fianna Fáil	South Dublin County Council	2016–	LGBTQ+		
Alan Edge	Independent	South Dublin County Council	2019–	Gay		
Owen Hanley	Social Democrats	Galway County Council	2019–2023	Gay		
Grace McManus	Sinn Féin	Wicklow County Council	2019–2023	Gay		
Paul O'Brien	Labour	Wicklow County Council	2019–	Gay		
Chris Pender	Social Democrats	Kildare County Council	2019–	Gay		
John Sheridan	Fianna Fáil	Louth County Council	2019–	LGBTQ+	First openly LGBTQ+ person elected in County Louth	
Darragh Adelaide	People Before Profit	South Dublin County Council	2024–2026	LGBTQ+		
Luke Corkery	Fine Gael	Fingal County Council	2024–	Gay		
Aisling Moran	Independent	Laois County Council	2024–	Gay	First openly LGBTQ+ person elected in County Laois	
Shane Hickey-O'Mara	Social Democrats	Limerick City and County Council	2024–	LGBTQ+		
John Maher	Labour	Cork City Council	2024–	Gay		
Declan Meehan	Independent	Donegal County Council	2024–	Gay		
Glen Moore	Independent (Irish Freedom Party until 2025)	South Dublin County Council	2024–	Gay		

== See also ==
- LGBT rights in Ireland
