= List of LGBTQ politicians in France =

This is a list of lesbian, gay, and bisexual, and transgender (LGBT) people who have served in various institutions of the government of France at the national and sub-national levels.

== Prime Ministers ==
Former

- Gabriel Attal (2024)

== Government members ==
Former

- Louis Jacquinot (1940, 1945-1946, 1947, 1949-1954, 1958-1966)
- André Labarrère (1981-1986) [Came out: 1998]
- Jean-Jacques Aillagon (2002-2004)
- Renaud Donnedieu de Vabres (2004-2007)
- Roger Karoutchi (2007-2009)
- Frédéric Mitterrand (2009-2012)
- Olivier Dussopt (2017-2024)
- Mounir Mahjoubi (2018-2019)
- Gabriel Attal (2018-2024)
- Franck Riester (2018-2024)
- Joël Giraud (2020-2022)
- Clément Beaune (2022-2024)
- Sarah El Haïry (2022-2024)
- Stéphane Séjourné (2024)
- Guillaume Kasbarian (2024)
- Gil Avérous (2024)

Current

== Members of Parliament ==
Former

- Charles, marquis de Villette (1792-1793)
- Jean-Jacques-Régis de Cambacérès (1792-1795)
- Louis Jacquinot (1932-1942, 1945-1959, 1967-1973)
- André Labarrère (1967-1968, 1973-1981, 1986-2006)
- Françoise Gaspard (1981-1988)
- Bertrand Delanoë (1981-1986, 1995-2001)
- Renaud Donnedieu de Vabres (1997-2007)
- Joël Giraud (2006-2020, 2022-2024)
- Olivier Dussopt (2007-2017, 2024)
- Franck Riester (2007-2018, 2024-2026)
- Corinne Bouchoux (2011-2017)
- Luc Carvounas (2011-2020)
- Sergio Coronado (2012-2017)
- Mounir Mahjoubi (2017-2019)
- Sarah El Haïry (2017-2020)
- Yannick Kerlogot (2017-2022)
- Pierre-Yves Bournazel (2017-2022)
- Matthieu Orphelin (2017-2022)
- Pacôme Rupin (2017-2022)
- Laurence Vanceunebrock-Mialon (2017-2022)
- Raphaël Gérard (2017-2024)
- Maxime Minot (2017-2024)
- Pierrick Berteloot (2022-2024)
- David Valence (2022-2024)
- Clément Beaune (2024)
- Stéphane Séjourné (2024)

Current

- Ségolène Amiot
- Gabriel Attal
- Bruno Bilde
- Pierre-Yves Cadalen
- Sébastien Chenu
- Bruno Clavet
- Alma Dufour
- Marie-Charlotte Garin
- Guillaume Kasbarian
- Andy Kerbrat
- Thomas Ménagé
- Emmanuel Taché
- Jean-Philippe Tanguy
- Ian Brossat (Senate)
- Hussein Bourgi (Senate)
- Roger Karoutchi (Senate)
- Mélanie Vogel (Senate)

== Members of the European Parliament ==
Former

- Steeve Briois (ID)
- Paul-Marie Coûteaux (IND/DEM)
- Françoise Gaspard (S&D)
- Pierre Karleskind (Renew)
- Roger Karoutchi (EPP)
- Florian Philippot (ID)
- Stéphane Séjourné (Renew)
- Michel Teychenné (S&D)

Current

- Mélissa Camara (Greens/EFA)

== Heads of local government ==
=== Mayors ===
- Mayor of Pau: André Labarrère (1971-2006)
- Mayor of Dreux: Françoise Gaspard (1977-1983) [Came out: 1980s]
- Mayor of L'Argentière-la-Bessée: Joël Giraud (1989-2007)
- Mayor of Paris: Bertrand Delanoë (2001-2014) [Came out: 1998]
- Mayor of Annonay: Olivier Dussopt (2008-2017)
- Mayor of Coulommiers: Franck Riester (2008-2017, 2026-present)
- Mayor of Châteauroux: Gil Avérous (2014-present), also mayor of Fontguenand (2008-2014)
- Mayor of Alfortville: Luc Carvounas (2012-2017, 2020–present)
- Mayor of Étouy: Maxime Minot (2014-2017)
- Mayor of Saint-Dié-des-Vosges: David Valence (2014-2022)
- Mayor of Montreuil: Patrice Bessac (2014-present)
- Mayor of Hénin-Beaumont: Steeve Briois (2014–present)
- Mayor of the 11th arrondissement of Paris: François Vauglin (2014-2026) ; David Belliard (2026-present)
- Mayor of the 12th arrondissement of Paris: Lucie Castets (2026-present)
- Mayor of Tilloy-lez-Marchiennes: Marie Cau (2020-2025)
- Mayor of Nancy: Mathieu Klein (2020–present)

=== Presidents of departmental and regional councils ===
- President of the departmental Council of Meurthe-et-Moselle: Mathieu Klein (2014-2020)

== Other notable LGBTQ politicians ==
- Camille Cabral - Member of the 17th arrondissement of Paris Council (2001-2008)
- Alice Coffin - Member of the Council of Paris (2020-2026)
- Bruno Julliard [Came out: 2011] - First Deputy Mayor of Paris (2014-2018)
- Caroline Mécary - Member of the Council of Paris (2014-2020) and of the Regional Council of Île-de-France (2010-2015)
- Jean-Luc Romero [Outed in 2000] - Deputy Mayor of Paris (2020-2026) and member of the Regional Council of Île-de-France (1998-2021)
