= Trams in Rotterdam =

Tram network in Rotterdam, Netherlands

Coordinates: 51°55′18″N 04°28′52″E

Rotterdam tramway network

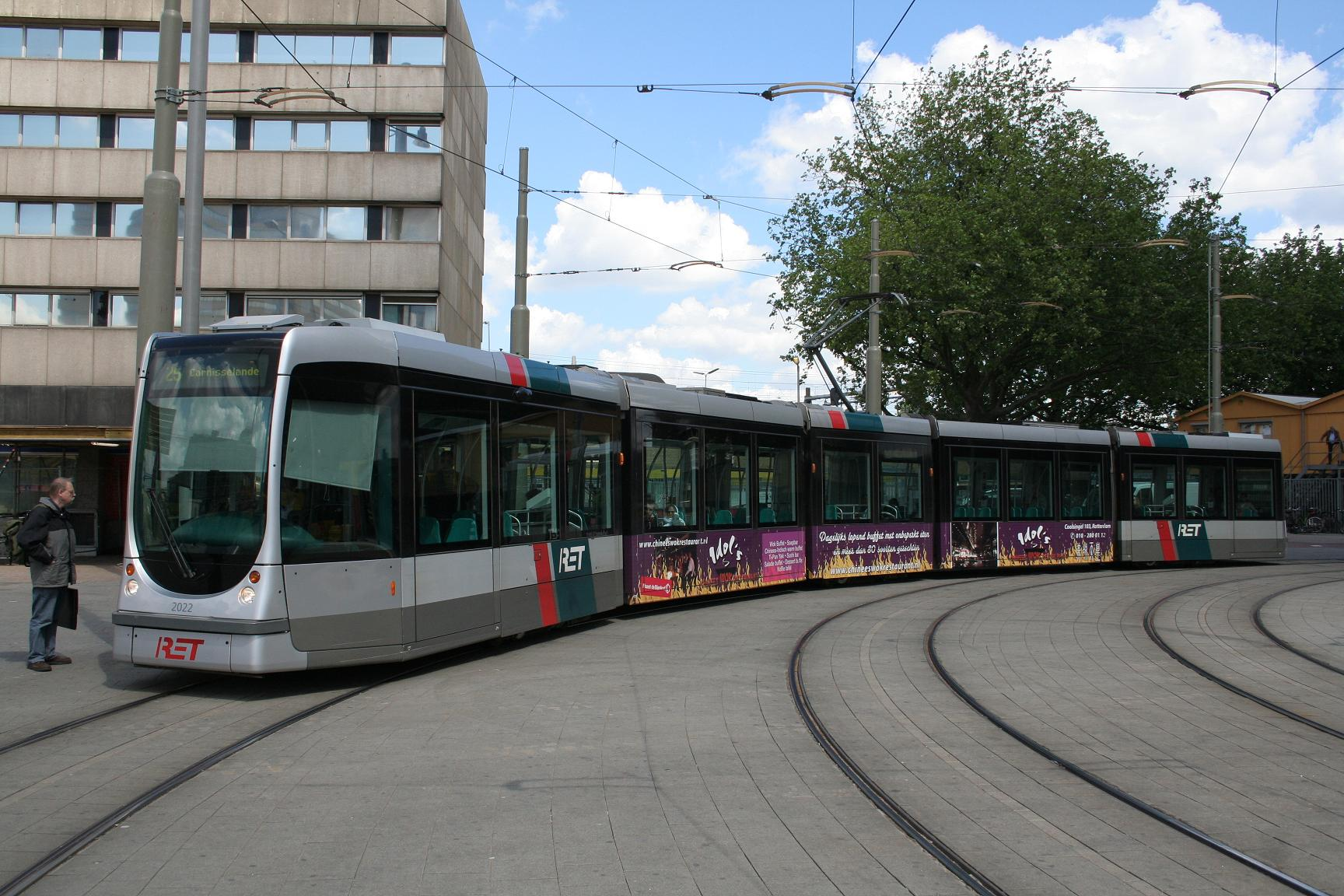
- An Alstom Citadis 302 tram outside Rotterdam CS, 2008.

Operation
- Locale: Rotterdam, Netherlands

Statistics
Horsecar era: 1879–1924/1925
- Status: Closed
- Track gauge: 1,435 mm (4 ft 8 1/2 in) standard gauge 1,067 mm (3 ft 6 in); 1,000 mm (3 ft 3 3/8 in) metre gauge
- Propulsion system: Horse
Electric tram era: since 1905
- Status: Open
- Lines: 9 (+ 3 special lines)
- Operator: Rotterdamse Elektrische Tram (RET) (since 1927)
- Track gauge: 1,435 mm (4 ft 8 1/2 in)
- Propulsion system: Electricity
- Electrification: 600 V DC Catenary
- Stock: 118
- Track length (single): 194 km (121 mi)
- Stops: 322
- 2021: 25 million
- Website: http://www.ret.nl/en/homepage.html RET
Overview

The Rotterdam tramway network (Dutch: Rotterdams tramnet) is a key element of the overall public transport arrangements in Rotterdam, Netherlands.

Opened in 1879, the network currently has nine regular tramlines, and three special or seasonal tramlines. It has been operated since 1927 by Rotterdamse Elektrische Tram (RET). The tram network is the city's more extensive public transport system, while the rapid transit Rotterdam Metro is the more utilized system.

== History ==
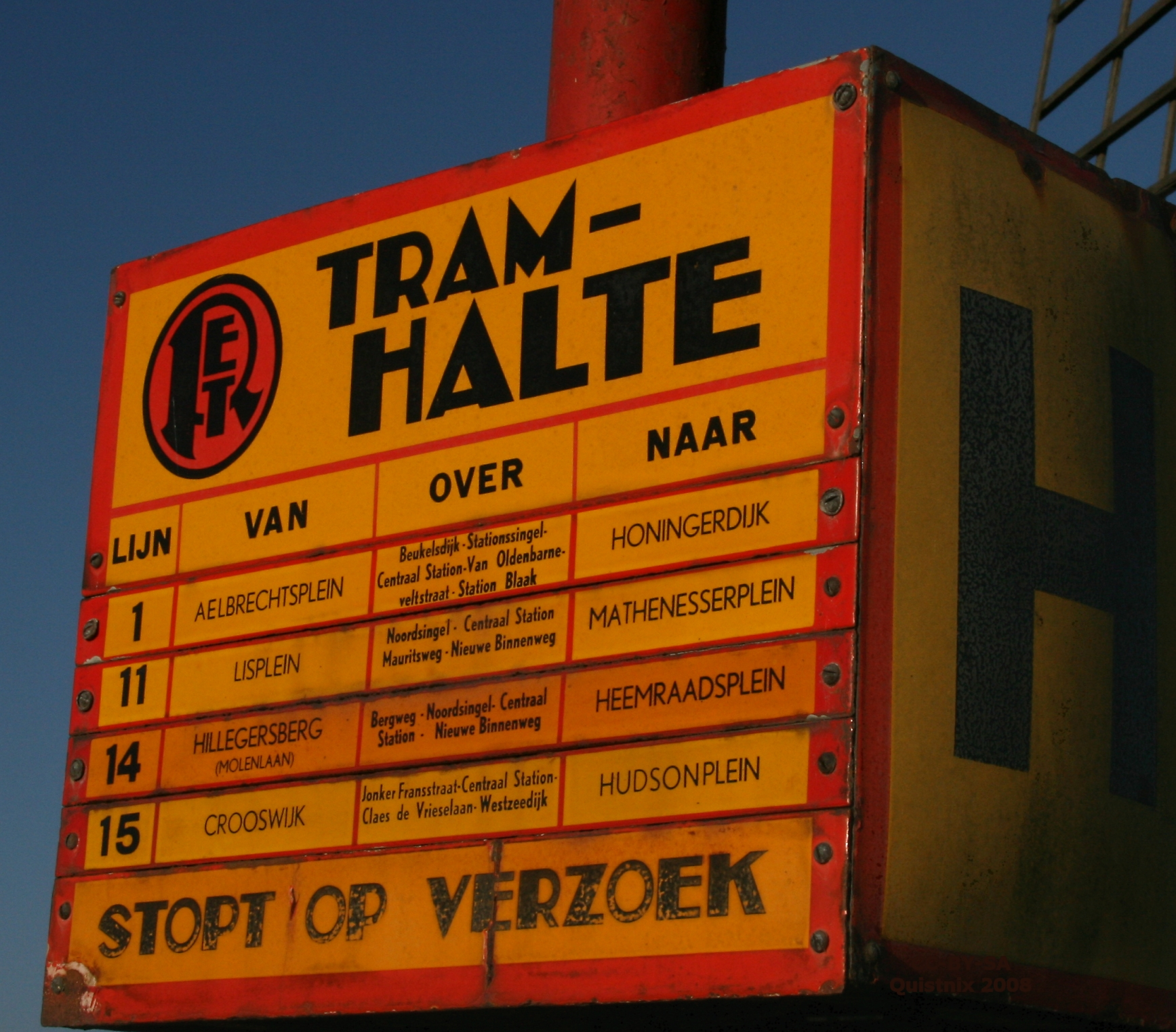
Old Rotterdam tram stop sign, at Oostmolen in Mijnsheerenland, 2008.

The RET has had two predecessor tramway companies, the RTM and the RETM, respectively. The RTM (Rotterdamsche Tramweg Maatschappij) was founded in 1878 to operate the first horse-drawn tramway in Rotterdam, which opened in 1879. From then until 1904, the RTM ran both horse trams and steam trams in and around the city, which was then much smaller than today.

Apart from the RTM, there were two other, smaller, companies operating tramway networks in and around Rotterdam in the late nineteenth and early twentieth centuries. In 1882, the Schielandsche Tramweg-Maatschappij opened a horse tramway of 1,067 mm (3 ft 6 in) gauge from the Hofplein via Schiekade and Bergweg to Hillegersberg. Two decades later, in 1902, the Schiedamsche Tramweg-Maatschappij opened a horse-drawn tramway in Schiedam from the station via Koemarkt to the Hoofdplein. This tramway had a gauge of 1,000 mm (3 ft 3 3/8 in).

A new form of urban transport, the electric tram, arrived in Rotterdam in 1904, with the creation of the new RETM (Rotterdamsche Electrische Tramweg Maatschappij). On 18 September 1905, the RETM began operating the first electric tram line in Rotterdam, line 1 (Honingerdijk – Beurs – Park). The current to power the line was supplied from a temporary generator. On 15 October 1906, the municipality started to supply electricity from the new power station, and the 21-year operating concession began. By the end of that year, there were already five electric tram lines operating. In 1907 and 1908, more lines entered service, to bring the total to nine lines. The maximum extent of Rotterdam's tramway network was 25 lines, and this was reached in 1930.

The livery of the RETM trams was originally dark blue, and was later changed to cream. From the 1930s, it was yellow ochre.

After 27 March 1907, the horse tramline to Overschie was the only remaining non-electric line of the RETM. Although the horse trams to Hillegersberg and Schiedam were still operating, they were not part of RETM network. On 31 December 1917, the Schiedam horsecar line was closed and not replaced. In 1919, the line to Hillegersberg was taken over by the RETM. In 1922 and 1923, the RETM converted this line to a 1,435 mm (4 ft 8 1/2 in) standard gauge electric tramway, and in 1924 and 1925, the horsecars on the line to Overschie were gradually replaced by trams with petrol engines. Finally, in 1928, the Overschie line was closed and replaced by a bus line.

During this period, the RTM continued to operate trams to and from the islands of South Holland and Zeeland.

Several years of negotiations in the 1920s culminated in the transfer of the RETM to the municipality of Rotterdam. On 4 April 1927, the council decided to approve the proposed transfer. On 15 October of that year, the RETM was transformed into a municipal transport company and renamed RET (Rotterdamse Elektrische Tram), with 1,903 employees.

On 2 September 2018, a tram ran into the rear of another tram on Dwarsdijk, injuring nine people.

== Lines ==
The following nine tramlines are part of Rotterdam's regular transit system:

Line	Termini	Route	Transport Company	Details
1	De Esch - Vlaardingen, Holy	Erasmus Universiteit, Oostplein, Station Blaak, Beurs, Rotterdam Centraal, Marconiplein, Station Schiedam Centrum, Station Nieuwland	RET	
2	Keizerswaard - Charlois	Station Lombardijen, Randweg, Hillevliet, Maashaven	RET	
3	Beverwaard - Rotterdam Centraal	Stadion Feijenoord, Wilhelminaplein, Leuvehaven, Beurs	RET	
4	Molenlaan - Heemraadsplein	Station Noord, Rotterdam Centraal, Eendrachtsplein	RET	
5	Carnisselande - Rotterdam Centraal	Groene Hilledijk, Randweg, Wilhelminaplein, Leuvehaven, Beurs	RET	
6	Kleiweg - Heemraadsplein	Station Noord, Rotterdam Centraal, Eendrachtsplein	RET	
7	Woudestein - Marconiplein	Erasmus Universiteit, Voorschoterlaan, Oostplein, Rotterdam Centraal	RET	
8	Spangen - Schiebroek	Marconiplein, Delfshaven, Erasmus MC, Eendrachtsplein, Rotterdam Centraal, Sint Franciscus Gasthuis, Melanchthonweg	RET	
11	De Esch - Schiedam, Woudhoek	Erasmus Universiteit, Oostplein, Station Blaak, Beurs, Rotterdam Centraal, Marconiplein, Station Schiedam Centrum, Station Nieuwland	RET	Does not run at night after 20:00, or on Sunday mornings.

The following two tramlines are seasonal lines or special lines:

Line	Termini	Transport Company	Details
10	Citytour Line 10	Rotterdam Public Transport Museum	Summer-only historical tourist tramline; outside of summer, the tram is available for rent for parties or marriages. Driven with historic Rotterdam trams.
12	Rotterdam Centraal - Stadion Feyenoord - Park+Ride Beverwaard	RET	Football-tram: only operates during big events or big matches in De Kuip (Feyenoord Stadium).

== Rolling stock ==
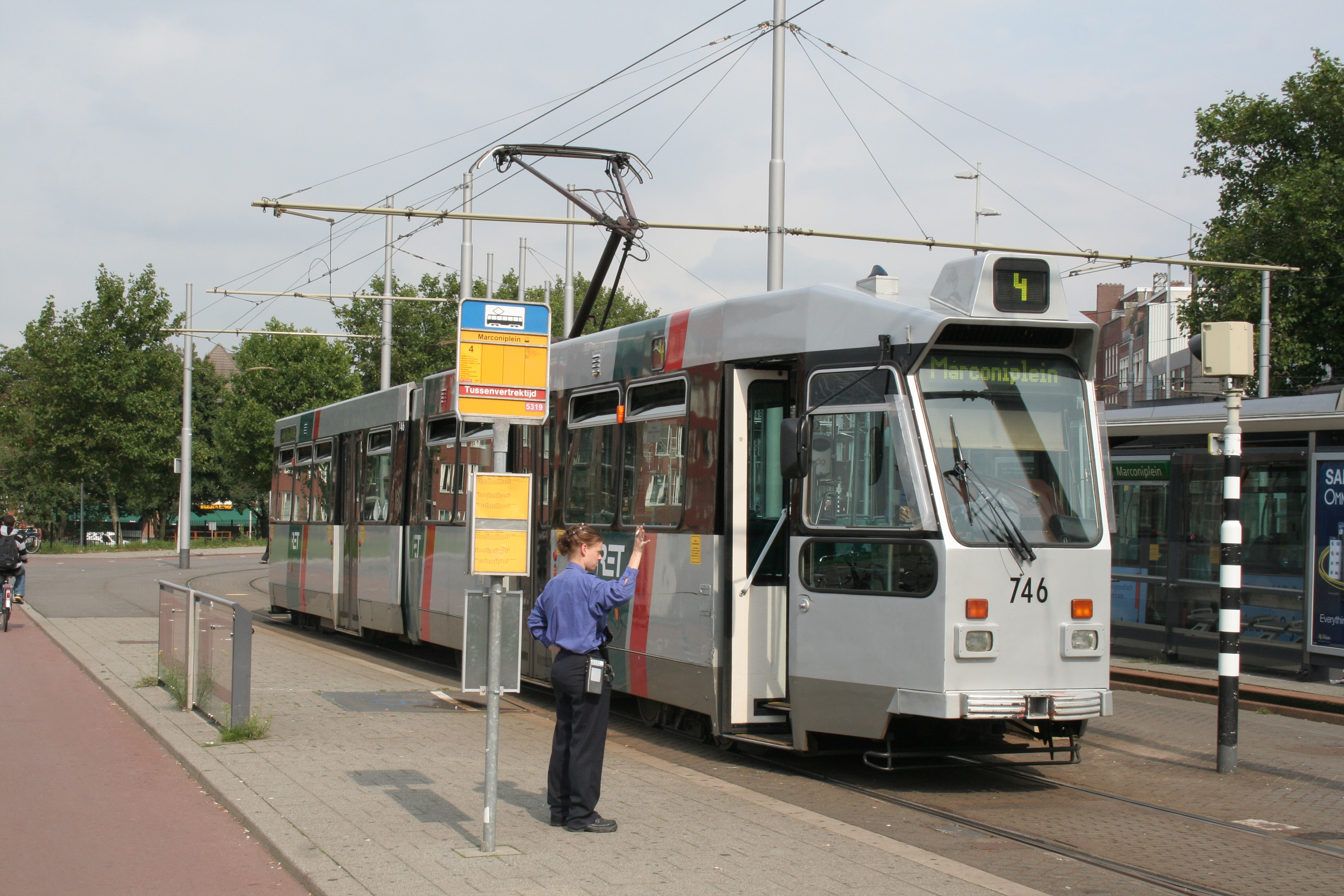
The ZGT-series tram, used until 2014

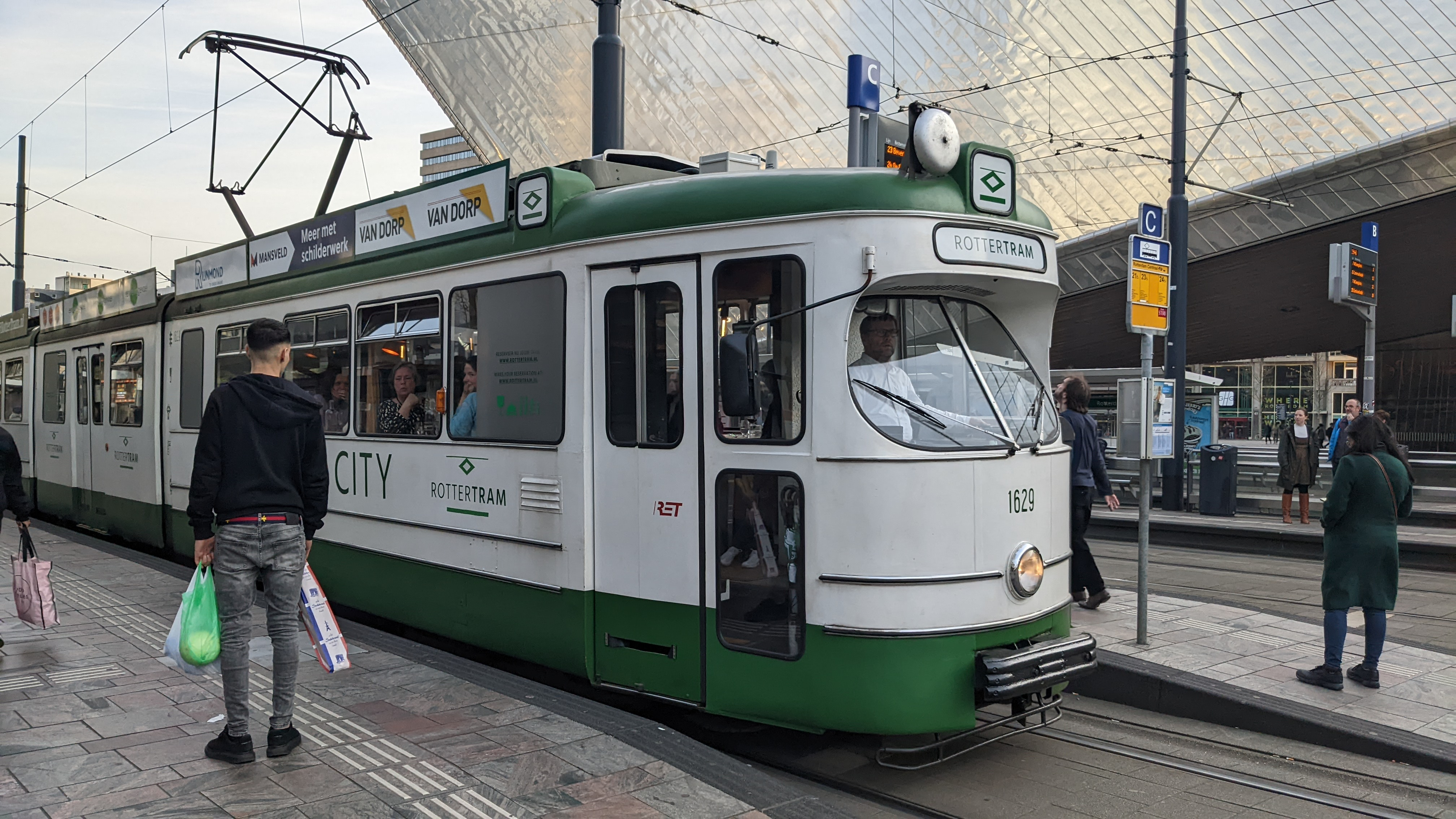
Tram Duewäg GT8/Werkspoor in Rotterdam

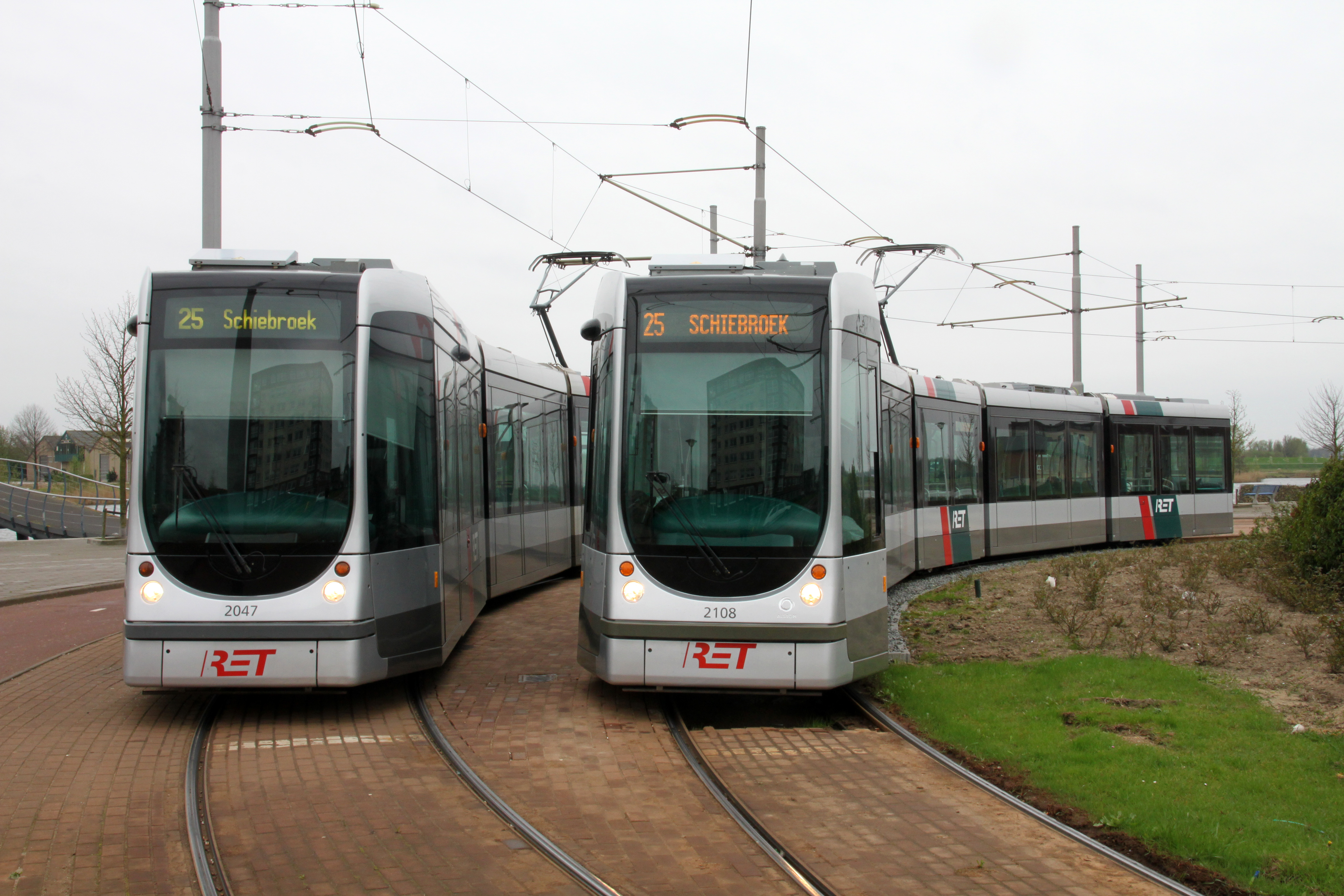
The two generations of Alstom Citadis trams; the older one is on the left and the newer on the right

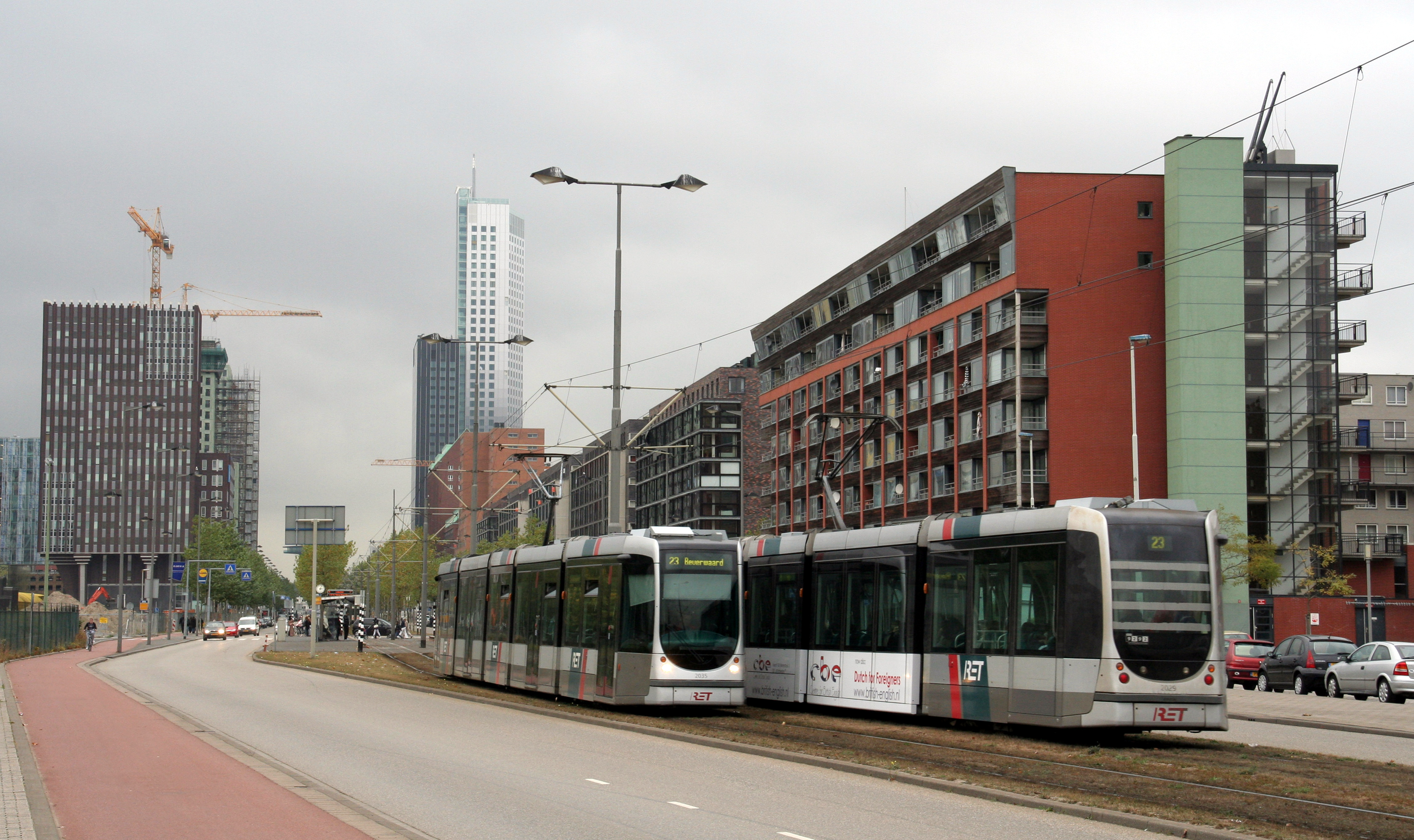
Two TramPlus trams

From the 1960s until 2003, almost the entire tram fleet was manufactured by Duewag. The last of these was the ZGT-series (nl), produced in collaboration with Stork and delivered from 1981 to 1988 in two batches of 50. Between 1985 and 1988, some older trams were modernized to extend their lives, so that they can remain in use until the introduction of the newer trams.

From 2002 to 2004, in conjunction with the TramPlus modernization project, Alstom delivered 60 articulated Citadis 302 vehicles (the 2000-series). These are five-section, 100% low-floor trams with a length of 31.5 metres (103 ft 4 3/16 in), a width of 2.4 metres (7 ft 10 1/2 in), and seating for 63 riders. They were limited to routes which were part of the TramPlus upgrade, as they were too large to operate on other routes. Two of these trams were damaged in a collision on 10 March 2014 and were repaired by joining them together. All 59 trams of this series were overhauled beginning in 2015.

In 2012, RET ordered 53 additional trams of the same model (the 2100-series). These trams are shorter than the previous generation by one-half metre (1 ft 7 11/16 in), reducing overhang when travelling around curves on routes not upgraded to TramPlus standards. There are also some technical improvements and other changes from the previous series, including padded seating and a modified interior layout. This series of trams replaced all of the high-floor ZGT trams by 2014 and as a result, Rotterdam has the first tram network in the Benelux to be completely wheelchair-accessible with only low-floor trams.

25 of the ZGT trams are being used second-hand on the tram network in Galaţi, Romania. 15 of these shipped from Rotterdam in 2008 and 10 more in 2012.

== See also ==
- List of town tramway systems in the Netherlands
- Narrow-gauge railways in the Netherlands
- Rotterdam Metro
