= Rotterdamse Elektrische Tram =

Public transport operator in Rotterdam

Rotterdamse Elektrische Tram N.V.
- Industry: Public transport
- Founded: Rotterdam, Netherlands (October 15, 1927)
- Headquarters: Rotterdam, Netherlands
- Revenue: 467 million euro (2018)
- Owner: Gemeente Rotterdam, Stadsregio Rotterdam
- Number of employees: 3,000
- Website: ret.nl

Rotterdamse Elektrische Tram (RET; English: Rotterdam Electric Tram) is the main public transport operator in Rotterdam, Netherlands. It started in 1905 when they took over the city tram lines from RTM (Rotterdamsche Tramweg Maatschappij). It currently operates 64 bus lines, 11 tram lines and five metro/light rail lines in Rotterdam and the surrounding municipalities.

RET used to employ the national tariff system, like other local transport companies in the Netherlands. On 29 January 2009, fares on the metro switched to using an OV-chipkaart; bus and tram fares followed on 11 February 2010.

== Tram ==
=== Tramlines ===
On 6 January 2025 RET changed most of its tramline numbers and their destinations. Tramlines 21, 23, 24 and 25 changed to the numbers 11, 3, 1 and 5. Tramlines 3 and 5 now terminate at Rotterdam Centraal to increase punctuality and be more reliable. Line 7 now goes to Marconiplein instead of Willemsplein. Line 8 goes to Schiebroek via Eendrachtsplein instead of Leuvehaven and Beurs. New line 6 was added for a fast connection to Kleiweg from Heemraadsplein. Line 20 got suspended, frequency on tramlines 2, 3 and 5 got increased.

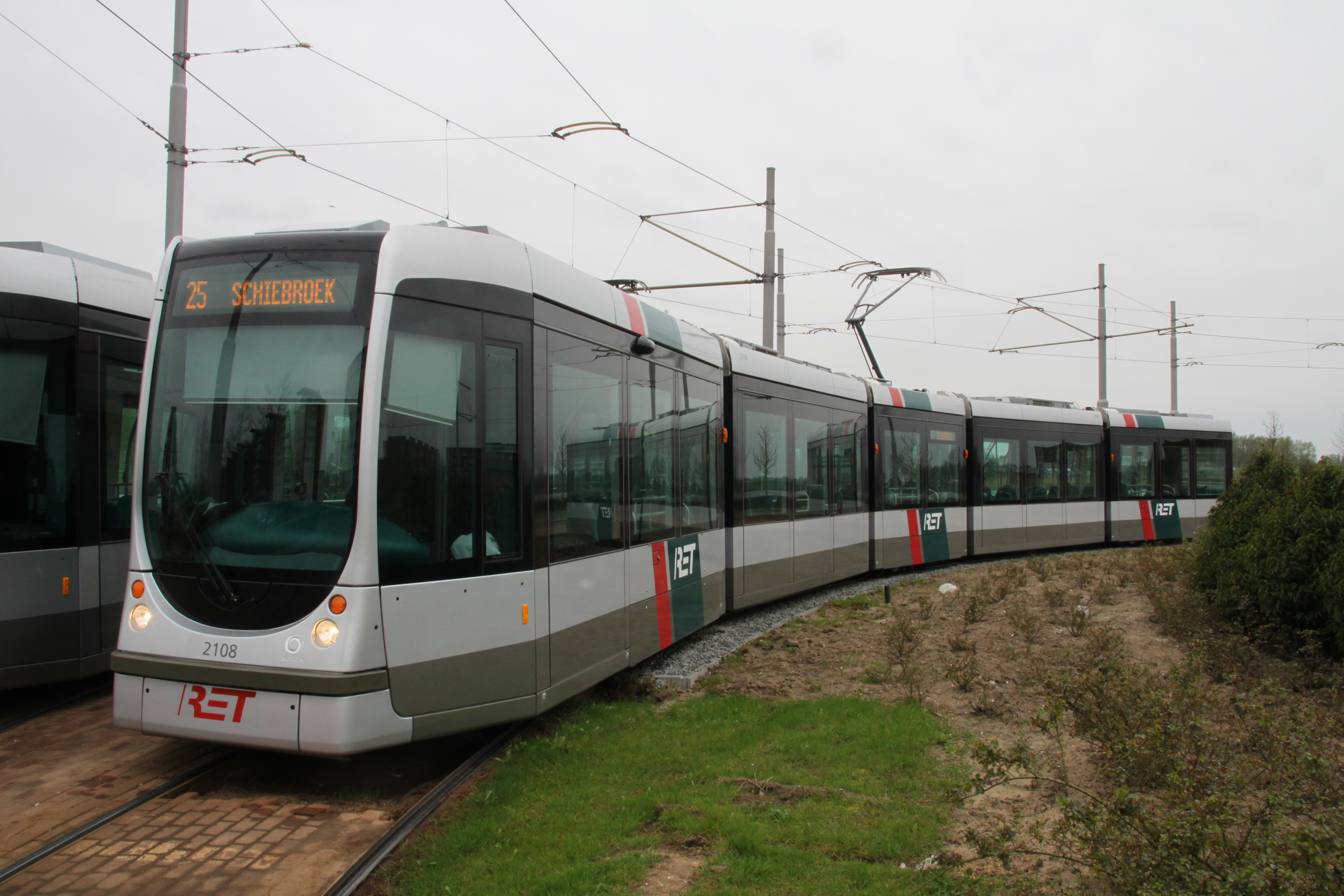
An Alstom Citadis tram

Line	Route	Via	Details
1	De Esch – Vlaardingen, Vlaardingen Holy	Oostplein, Station Blaak, Beurs, Rotterdam Centraal, Marconiplein, Station Schiedam, Station Nieuwland	
2	Charlois – Keizerswaard	Station Lombardijen, Maashaven	
3	Beverwaard – Rotterdam Centraal	Stadion Feijenoord, Wilhelminaplein, Leuvehaven, Beurs, Rotterdam Centraal	
4	Molenlaan – Heemraadsplein	Station Noord, Rotterdam Centraal, Eendrachtsplein	
5	Carnisselande – Rotterdam Centraal	Wilhelminaplein, Leuvehaven, Beurs, Rotterdam Centraal	
6	Kleiweg – Heemraadsplein	Station Noord, Rotterdam Centraal, Eendrachtsplein	Tramline for fast connection to Kleiweg from Heemraadsplein
7	Woudestein – Marconiplein	Erasmus Universiteit, Voorschoterlaan, Rotterdam Centraal	
8	Schiebroek – Spangen	Melanchthonweg, Rotterdam Centraal, Eendrachtsplein, Erasmus MC, Delfshaven, Marconiplein	
10	Operated by RoMeO		Historic tourist tramline during the summer Otherwise a rentable tram for party's or marriages
11	De Esch – Schiedam, Woudhoek	Oostplein, Station Blaak, Beurs, Rotterdam Centraal, Marconiplein, Station Schiedam, Station Nieuwland	
12	Rotterdam Centraal – Stadion Feyenoord		Operates only during major events or matches at De Kuip.
20	Lombardijen – Rotterdam Centraal	Station Lombardijen, Wilhelminaplein, Beurs	suspended

== Bus ==
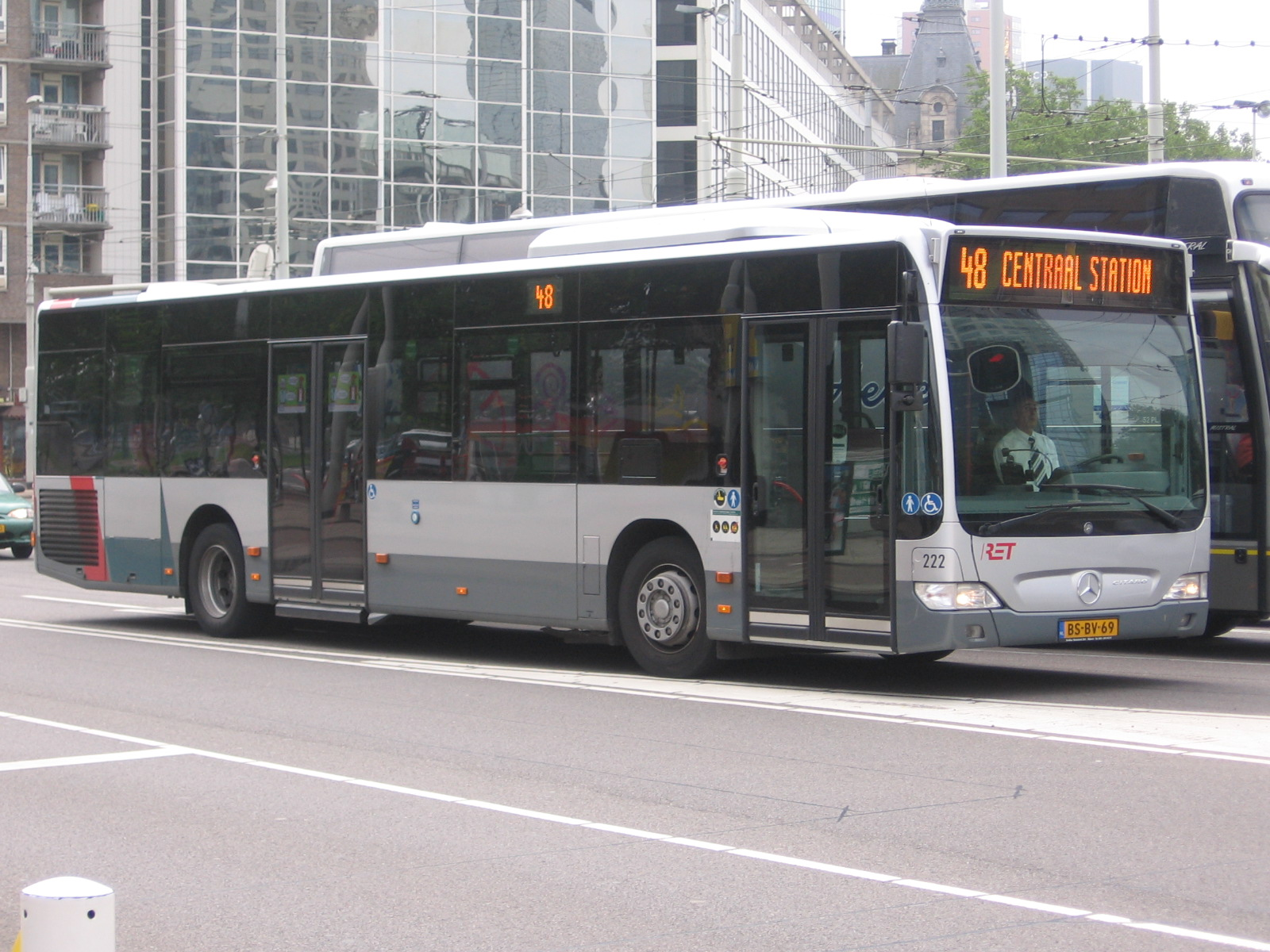
A Mercedes-Benz Citaro bus

=== Buslines ===
Line	Route	Via	Details
30	Station Alexander – Capelle Schollevaar		
31	Station Alexander – Oostgaarde	Capelle Centrum	
32	Overschie – Station Zuid	Heemraadsplein, Eendrachtsplein, Station Blaak	
33	Meijersplein – Rotterdam The Hague Airport – Rotterdam Centraal	Overschie, Blijdorp	
35	Melanchthonweg – Station Alexander	Schiebroek, Hillegersberg, Terbregge, Ommoord	
36	Station Alexander – Kralingse Zoom	Het Lage Land, Prinsenland	
37	Station Alexander – Capelsebrug	Het Lage Land, IJsselland Ziekenhuis, Capelle Centrum	
38	Station Schiedam Centrum – Rotterdam Centraal – Crooswijk		
40	Delft Station – Rotterdam Centraal	TU Delft, De Zweth, Overschie	
42	Bedrijvenpark Noord-West – Marconiplein	Overschie, Spaanse Polder	
44	Zuidplein – Rotterdam Centraal	Erasmus MC, Heemraadsplein, Diergaarde Blijdorp	
47	Station Blaak – Noordereiland		
51	Station Schiedam Centrum – Woudhoek	Station Schiedam Nieuwland, Vlietland Ziekenhuis	
53	Woudhoek – Station Schiedam Centrum		
54	Station Schiedam Centrum – De Gorzen		
56	Station Vlaardingen West – Holy-Noord	Liesveldviaduct, Station Vlaardingen Oost, Overdrevenpad	
66	Zuidplein – Feijenoord	Station Zuid	
67	Zuidplein – Pendrecht	Carnisse	
68	Zuidplein – Heijplaat	Slinge, Waalhaven	
69	Zuidplein – Pernis	Waalhaven, Distripark Eemhaven	
70	Charlois – Keizerswaard	Zuidplein, Zuidwijk, Station Lombardijen	
72	Zuidplein – Sluisjesdijk	Slinge, Waalhaven O.Z.	
75	Zuidplein – Kralingse Zoom		
76	Zuidplein – Keizerswaard	Vreewijk, Station Lombardijen, Groot-IJsselmonde	
77	Zuidplein – ss Rotterdam	Hillesluis, Rijnhaven	
78	Hoogvliet Metro	Westpunt, Oudeland	
79	Poortugaal Metro – Delta Psych. Centrum		
80	Hoogvliet Metro – Hoogvliet Centrum	Zalmplaat, Meeuwenplaat	
82	Zuidplein – Zuidplein	Slinge, Barendrecht Carnisselande, Rhoon Portland, Slinge	
83	Keizerswaard – Kralingse Zoom	Erasmus Universiteit	
84	Zuidplein – Barendrecht railway station	Pascalweg, Barendrecht Molenvliet	
96	Capelsebrug – Krimpen aan den Ijssel	Krimpen Busstation	Rush hour only
97	Capelsebrug – Krimpen aan den Ijssel	Krimpen Busstation	Runs counterclockwise
98	Capelsebrug – Krimpen aan den Ijssel	Krimpen Busstation	Runs clockwise
121	Hof van Spaland – Woudhoek		Shuttlebus after Tramline 21 service ends.
126	Station Schiedam Centrum – Maassluis West Metro	Vijfsluizen, Station Vlaardingen Oost, Liesveldviaduct, Maasland Viaduct	Not on Sundays
127	Vlaardingen Oost Metro - Vijfsluizen Metro	Mr. L.A. Kesperweg	Not on weekends
140	Kralingse Zoom – Ridderkerk, Slikkerveer	Bolnes	Weekdays only
143	Zuidplein – Dordrecht railway station	Station Lombardijen, Keizerwaard, Ridderkerk	Not on Sundays
144	Zuidplein – Ridderkerk, 't Zand	Station Lombardijen, Keizerwaard, Bolnes, Slikkerveer, Ridderkerk	Service continues as Busline 146
146	Zuidplein – Ridderkerk, 't Zand	A15	Service continues as Busline 144
156	Station Vlaardingen West - Holy-Noord	Liesveldviaduct, Station Vlaardingen Oost, Jean Monnetring	Not on Sundays
170	Zoetermeer, Centrum West – Rodenrijs Metrostation	Station Zoetermeer, Station Zoetermeer Oost, Berkel en Rodenrijs	
173	Lansingerland-Zoetermeer – Rodenrijs Metrostation	Bleiswijk, Korenmolenweg, Bergschenhoek, Berkel en Rodenrijs	
174	Delft, Station – Noord Station	TU Delft, Pijnacker Zuid, Berkel Westpolder, Berkel, Berschenhoek	
183	Zuidplein – Kralingse Zoom	Slinge, Rhoon Portland, Barendrecht Carnisselande, Barendrecht, Station Lombardijen, Keizerwaard	
187	Zuidplein – Barenrecht, Bedrijventerrein	Pascalweg, Barendrecht railway station	Peak hours only
188	Barendrecht railway station – Barenrecht, Bedrijventerrein		Peak hours only
245	Kralingse Zoom – Ridderkerk, 't Zand	Ridderkerk	Not on weekends
283	Kralingse Zoom - Zuidplein	Rotterdam Lombardijen NS, A15, IKEA Barendrecht, Slinge Metro	Peak hours only
290	Zuidplein – Ridderkerk, Ridderhaven		Peak hours only
526	Maassluis West Metro		STOPandGO line (route depends on demand); On weekdays + Saturdays only after 19:00; On Sunday the whole day.
557	Vlaardingen Centrum Metro		STOPandGO line (route depends on demand)
601	Beverwaard – Barendrecht, Gemeentehuis (City Hall)	Bolnes, Slikkerveer, Ridderkerk, Barendrecht railway station	Not on Sundays
602	Poortugaal Metro – Barendrecht Carnisselande	Poortugaal, Delta Psych. Centrum, Rhoon, Rhoon Portland	Not on Sundays
603	Barendrecht Station - Barendrecht Carnisselande		Weekdays only
604	Barendrecht Station - Barendrecht Station (ring)		Weekdays only
606	Capelsebrug Metro - Capelsebrug Metro (ring)	Capelle West	Weekdays only
607	Capelsebrug Metro - Schollevaar	Capelle Centrum Metro, De Terp Metro, Capelle Schollevaar NS	Weekdays only
611	Hoek van Holland Haven - Hoek van Holland Strand		Not on Sundays
668	Zuidplein - Slinge Metro	STC Campus	Schoolservice, weekdays only

== Metro ==
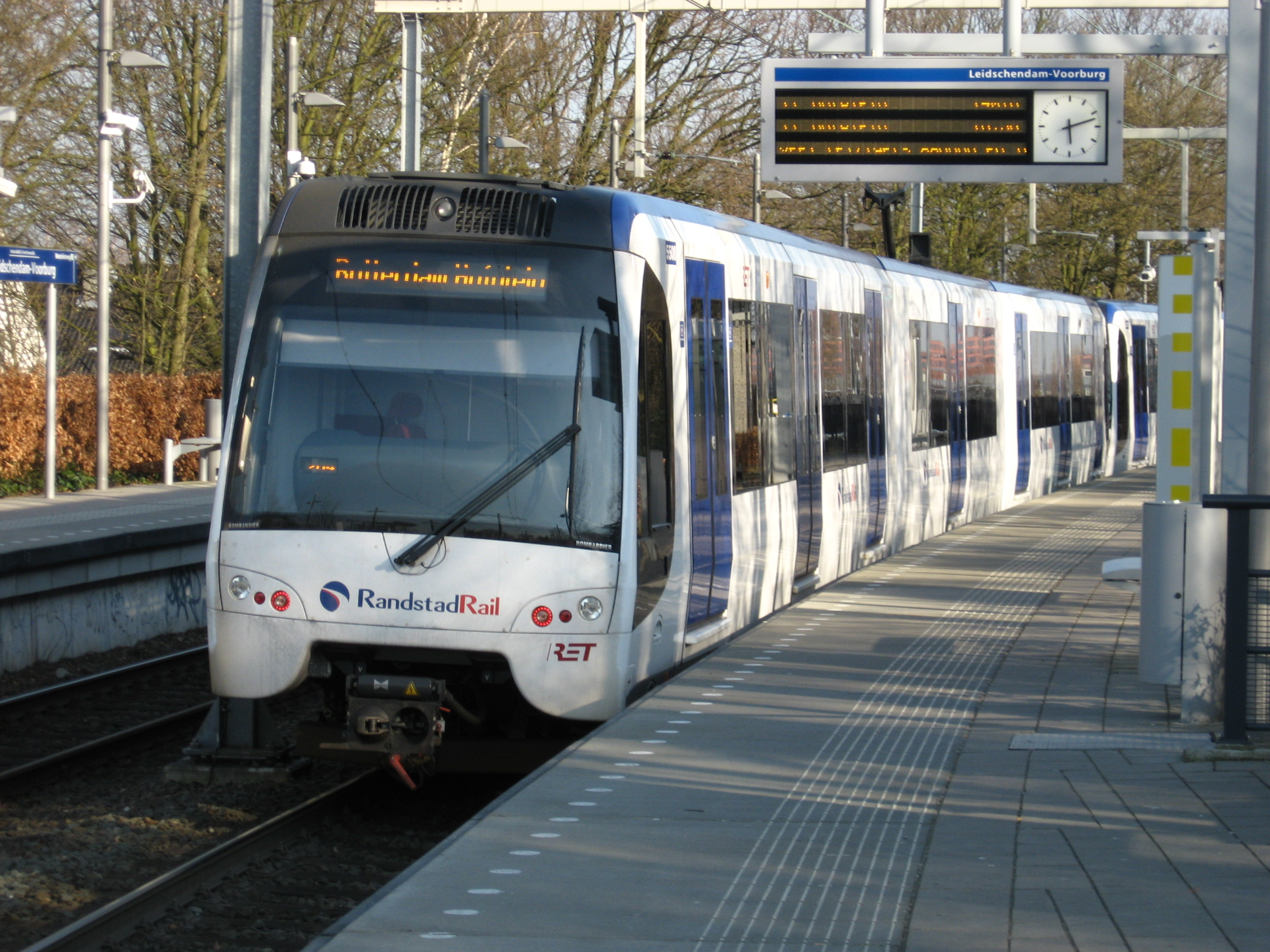
A Bombardier metro train

=== Metrolines ===
Line	Southern / western terminus	Northern / eastern terminus	Remarks
Line A	(Vlaadingen West) - Schiedam Centrum	Binnenhof	Schiedam Centrum - Vlaardingen West is only served by line A during rush hour.
Line B	Hoek van Holland Strand	Nesselande	
Line C	De Akkers	De Terp	
Line D	De Akkers	(Pijnacker Zuid) - Rotterdam Centraal	Pijnacker Zuid - Rotterdam Centraal is only served by line D during rush hour.
Line E	Slinge	Den Haag Centraal	
