= Rotterdam Zuid railway station =

Railway station in Feijenoord, southern Rotterdam, the Netherlands

Rotterdam Zuid
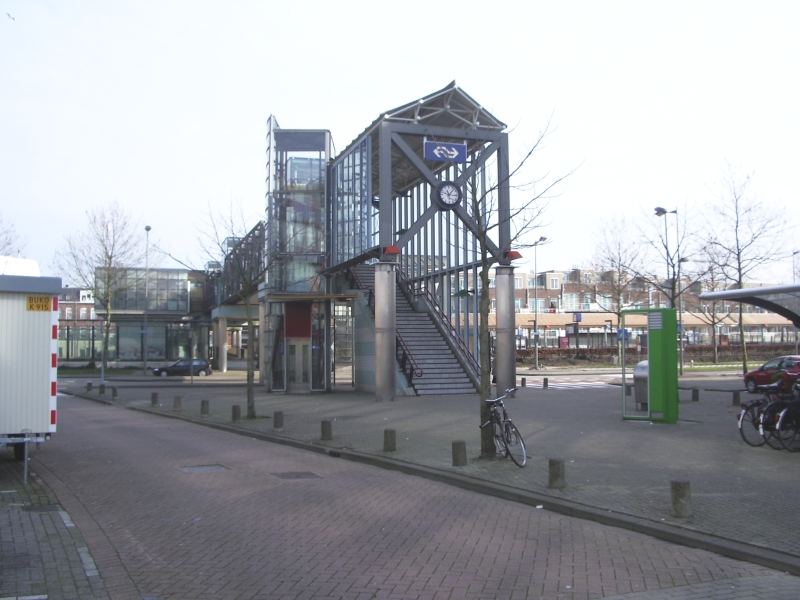
- Rotterdam Zuid

General information
- Location: Netherlands
- Coordinates: 51°54′34″N 4°30′34″E
- Line: Breda–Rotterdam railway
- Platforms: 4

Other information
- Station code: Rtz

History
- Opened: 2 May 1877

Services
Preceding station	Nederlandse Spoorwegen	Following station
Rotterdam Blaak towards Den Haag Centraal	NS Sprinter 5000 Mon-Fri until 20:00	Rotterdam Lombardijen towards Dordrecht
Rotterdam Blaak towards Den Haag Centraal	NS Sprinter 5100	Rotterdam Lombardijen towards Dordrecht
Rotterdam Blaak towards Den Haag Centraal	NS Sprinter 5200 Mon-Thu until 19:00	Rotterdam Lombardijen towards Dordrecht
Location
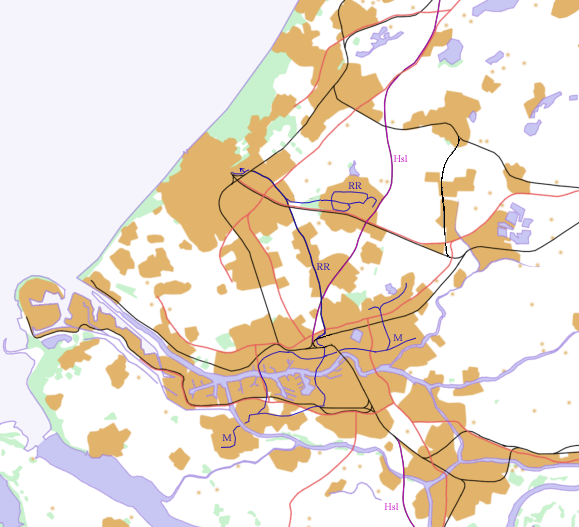
- Location within Southwest Randstad Location within Netherlands

Rotterdam Zuid is a railway station in the city of Rotterdam in the Netherlands, located on the Breda–Rotterdam railway between Rotterdam and Dordrecht. It is situated at the end of the Willemsspoortunnel in the borough of Feijenoord.

== History ==
Rotterdam Zuid was first opened on 2 May 1877 as a station on the Breda–Rotterdam railway (Staatslijn I). To the north was the Hefbrug, connecting the rail tracks from the north and the south of Rotterdam, and to the south was Barendrecht. The area around the station was less developed than today. It was a simple station, without a building and only two platforms. After World War II, the reconstruction of the railroad tracks in and around Rotterdam began. In 1958, Rotterdam Zuid was renovated and had gained a small building.

The station remained that way until the next reconstruction in 1993, when a tunnel was built to replace the flyover at Blaak and the bridges over the Meuse. The station was given a total makeover. The number of tracks between Rotterdam and Dordrecht was being expanded from two to four, giving the station four platform tracks. To reach all of the platforms, a traverse was built over the station, which connected the Rosestraat and the Oranjeboomstraat.

== Train services ==
The following services call at Rotterdam Blaak:

- 2x per hour local service (sprinter) The Hague - Rotterdam - Dordrecht - Breda
- 2x per hour local service (sprinter) The Hague - Rotterdam - Dordrecht - Roosendaal

== Bus and tram services ==
Rotterdam Zuid is a stop for the following Bus lines on the RET network.

Bus Service	Route	Notes
48	Centraal Station - Station Zuid - Keizerswaard	Station Zuid - Keizerswaard only during peak hours and Feyenoord matches.
66	Zuidplein - Feijenoord	

At night, Rotterdam Zuid is connected by the Bob bus, operated by RET. Bob is a drink-or-drive campaign.

Bob Busline	Route	Notes
BOB 7	Rotterdam Centraal - Spijkenisse Centrum	Nightly
