= Portlandsebrug =

Bicycle and pedestrian bridge in Rotterdam and Albrandswaard

Portlandse bridge Portlandsebrug
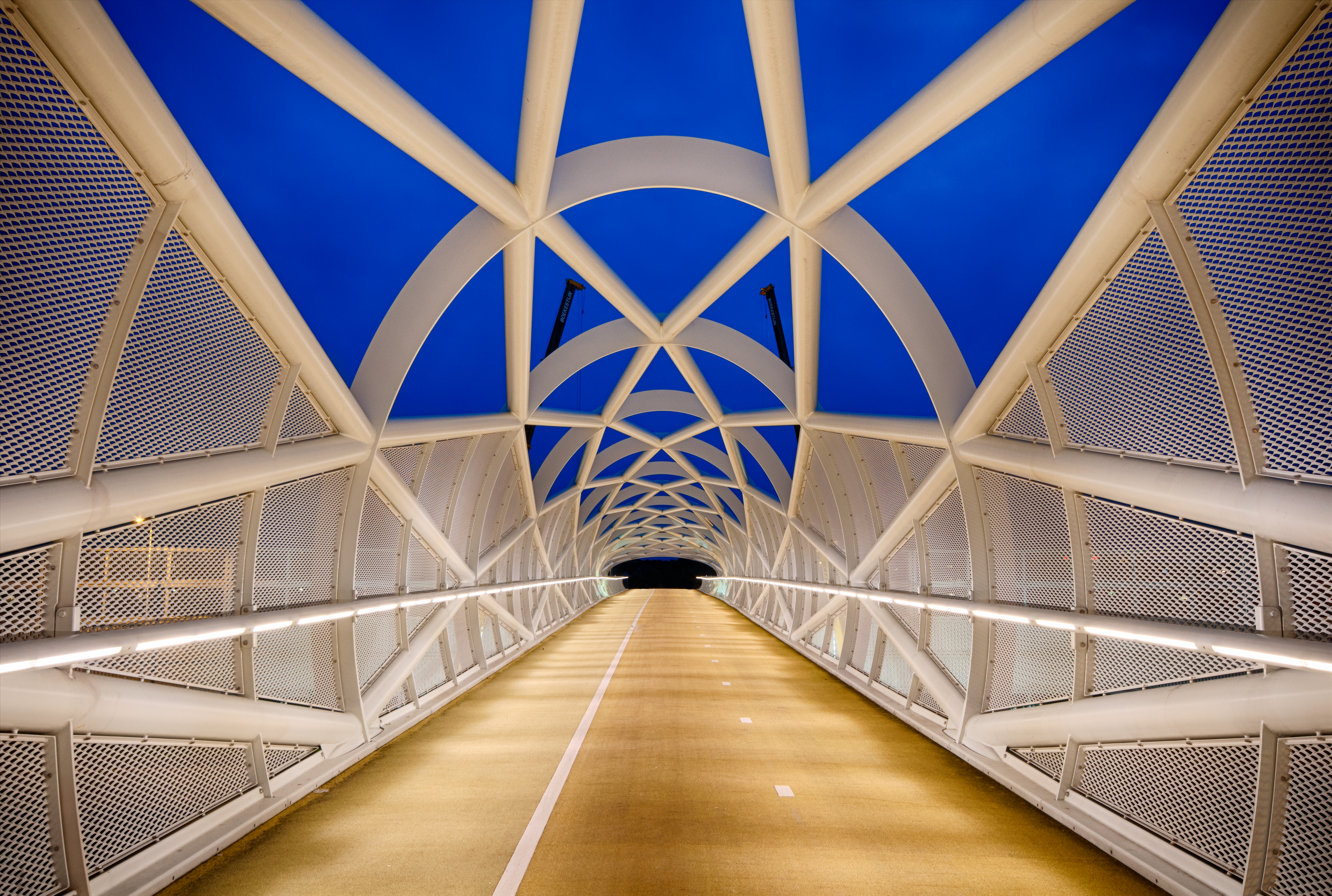
- Coordinates: 51°51′43.2″N 4°27′53.999″E
- Crosses: A15 motorway
- Official name: Portlandsebrug
- Other name(s): Groene Verbinding (Green Connection); Netkous

Characteristics
- Total length: 150 meters

History
- Architect: Marc Verheijen
- Engineering design by: Jaco Reusink
- Constructed by: van der Horst van der Made; VDS staalbouw
- Construction end: 11 June 2014
- Construction cost: 9.2 million euros

Location
- Interactive map of Portlandse bridge

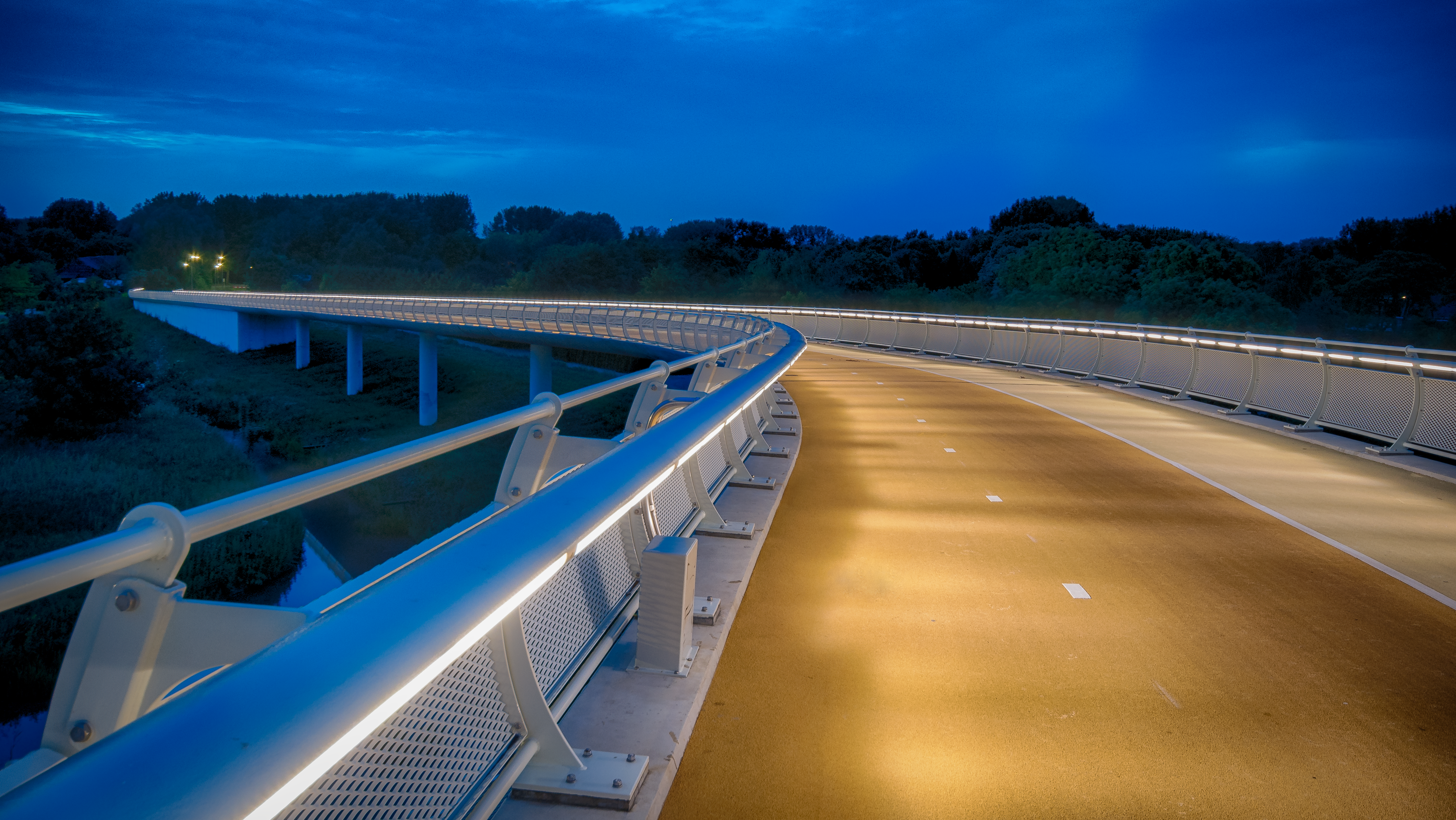

The Portlandsebrug, known as the Netkous, is a bicycle and pedestrian bridge in Rotterdam and Albrandswaard crossing the A15 motorway and connects Rotterdam-Charlois with Rhoon.
