= Rhoon metro station =

Metro station in Albrandswaard, Netherlands

Rhoon
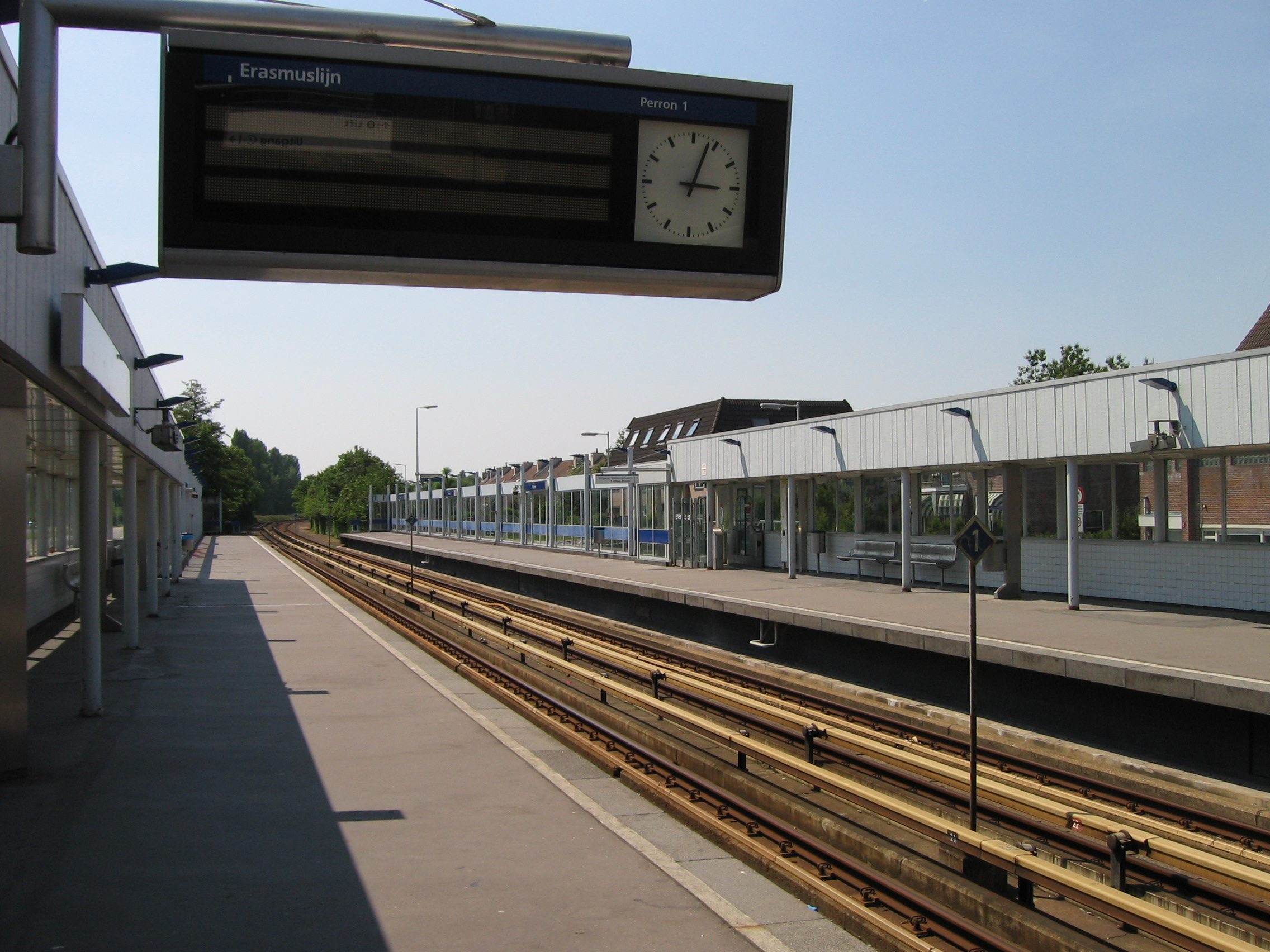

General information
- Coordinates: 51°51′33″N 4°25′9″E
- System: Rotterdam Metro station
- Owner: RET
- Platforms: Side platforms
- Tracks: 2

History
- Opened: 1974

Services
Preceding station	Rotterdam Metro	Following station
Poortugaal towards De Akkers	Line D	Slinge towards Rotterdam Centraal
Location

Rhoon is an above-ground subway station of Rotterdam Metro line D. The station is located just north of the centre of Rhoon, a village in the municipality Albrandswaard to the southwest of Rotterdam.

The station was opened on 25 October 1974. On that date, the North-South Line was extended from its former terminus, Slinge, towards Zalmplaat station. As a less busy station it is only equipped with one escalator located at the platform with the most upward motions, which as this is a station which is accessed via overpass, is the platform towards De Akkers on the North side. This side also has a secondary exit roughly at ground level.

Right outside the station, passengers can get on RET-operated bus line 62.

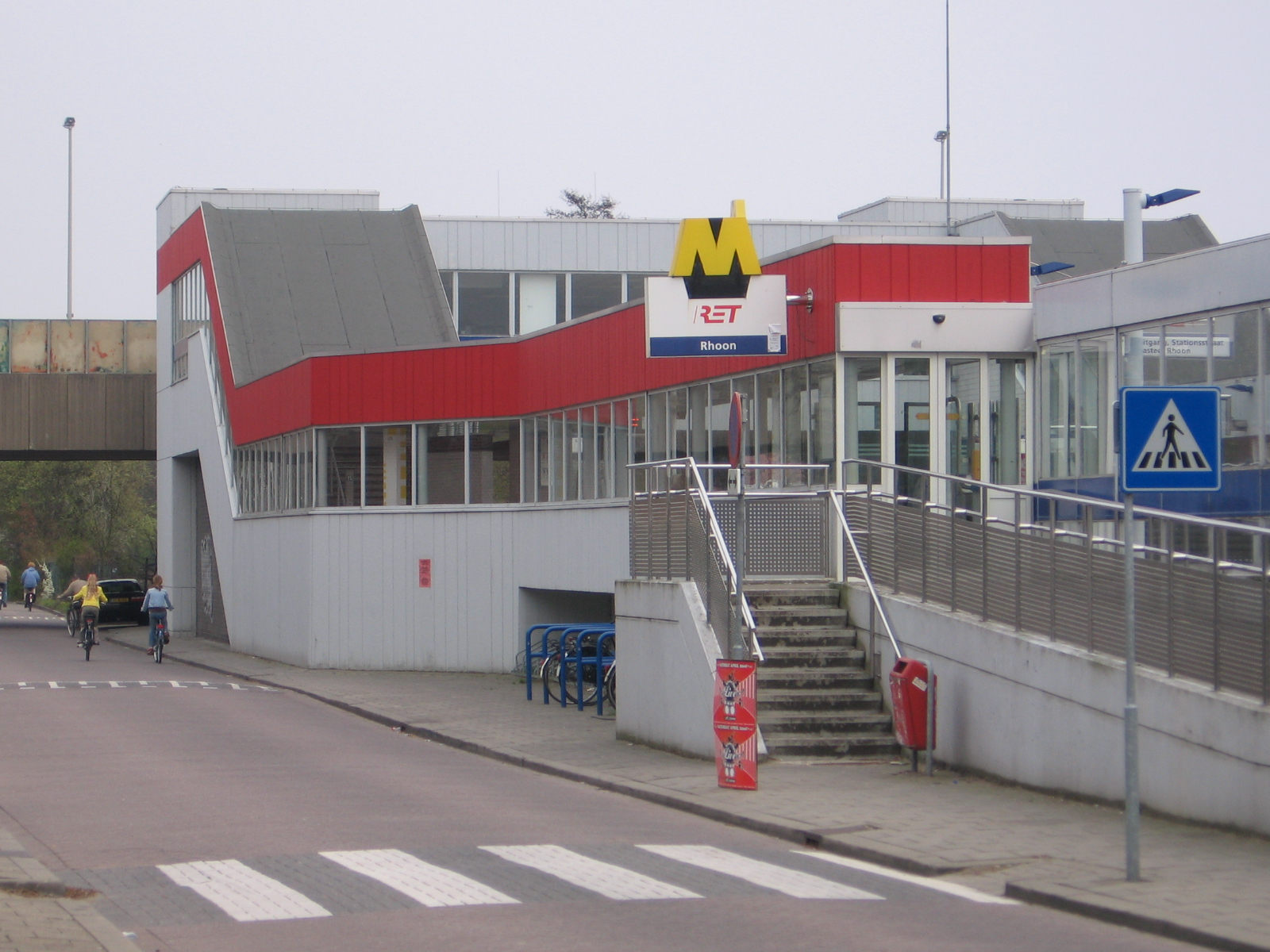
The entrance to the station.
