= Rhoonse Veer =

Coordinates: 51°51′00″N 4°25′20″E

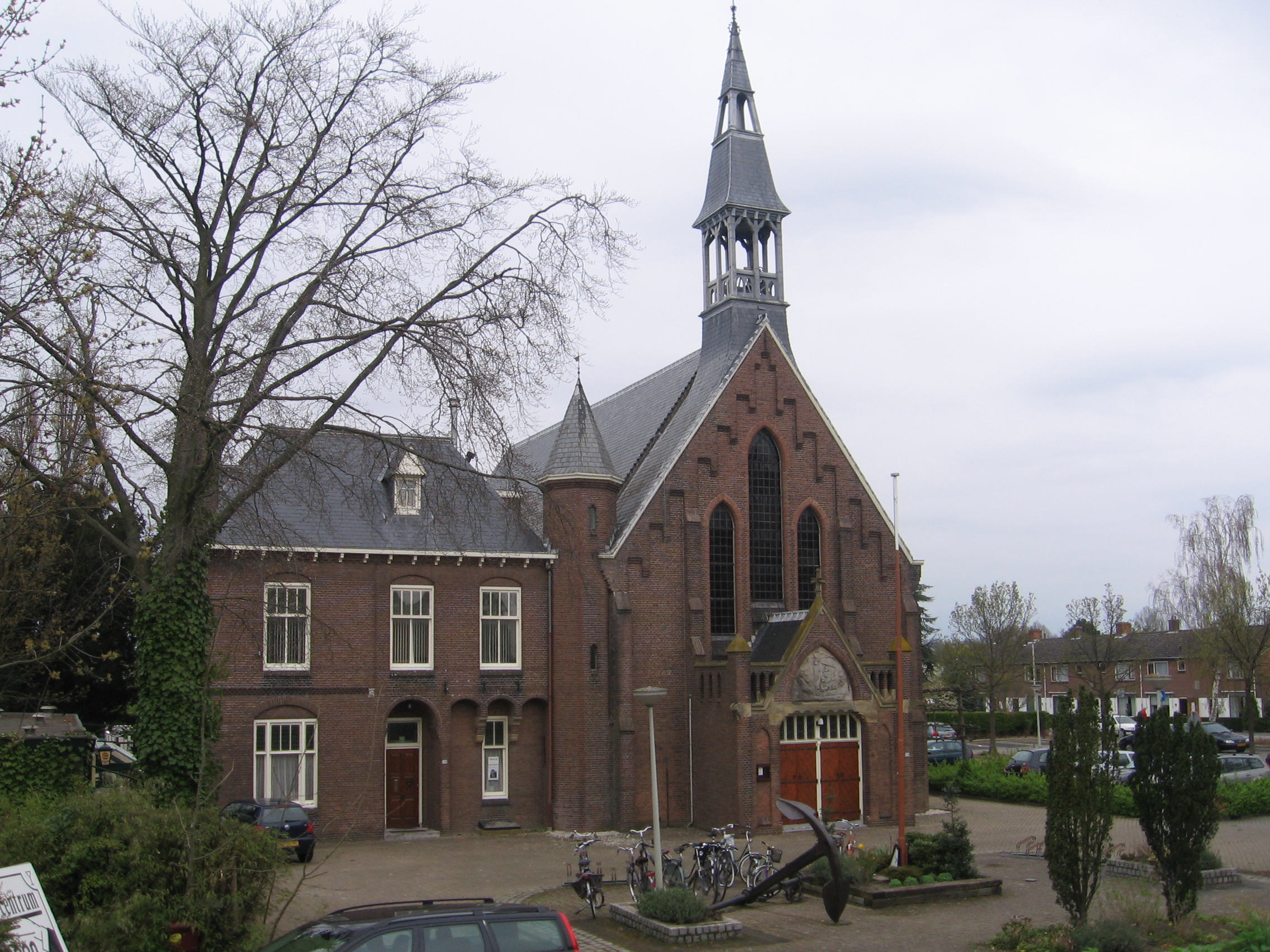
The current catholic church, on the site of the old one, dates from 1894.

Rhoonse Veer is a former hamlet, located south of the Dutch town of Rhoon. The name means "Rhoon's ferry", and refers to the ferry between Rhoon and Oud-Beijerland.

The hamlet grew around the Catholic Church of Rhoon. After the Reformation, the Catholics in the area lost their church in Rhoon to the Protestant majority, but the lord of Rhoon, Willem Bentinck, allowed them to build a new church near the ferry in 1684.

The hamlet no longer exists; it is now a part of the town of Rhoon itself. There is still a ferry called "Rhoonsveer"; it departs from the marina 500 m south of the former hamlet of Rhoonse Veer, with service to Spijkenisse and Oud-Beijerland.
