= Rotterdam Lombardijen railway station =

Railway station in the Netherlands

Rotterdam Lombardijen
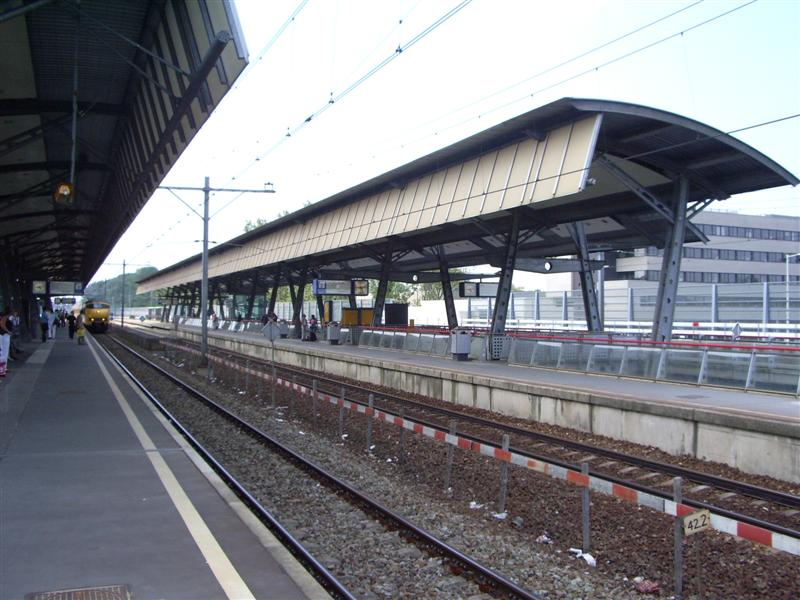

General information
- Location: Netherlands
- Coordinates: 51°52′47″N 4°31′52″E
- Line: Breda–Rotterdam railway
- Platforms: 4

Other information
- Station code: Rlb

History
- Opened: 1964

Services
Preceding station	Nederlandse Spoorwegen	Following station
Rotterdam Zuid towards Den Haag Centraal	NS Sprinter 5000 Mon-Fri until 20:00	Barendrecht towards Dordrecht
Rotterdam Zuid towards Den Haag Centraal	NS Sprinter 5100	Barendrecht towards Dordrecht
Rotterdam Zuid towards Den Haag Centraal	NS Sprinter 5200 Mon-Thu until 19:00	Barendrecht towards Dordrecht
Location
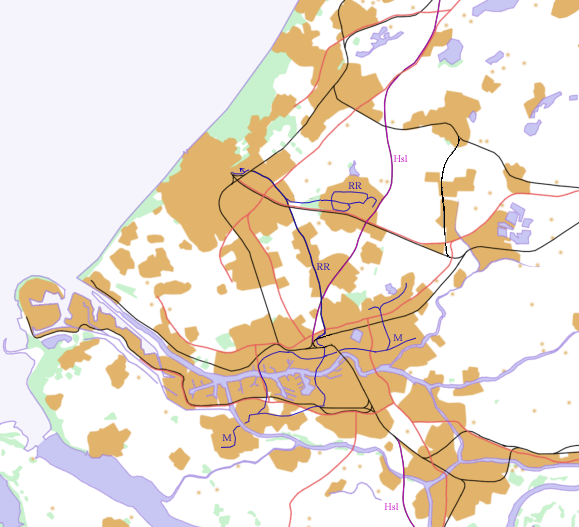
- Location within Southwest Randstad Location within Netherlands

Rotterdam Lombardijen is a railway station in the Dutch city of Rotterdam, located on the Breda–Rotterdam railway between Rotterdam and Dordrecht. The railway station is located in the borough of IJsselmonde. The station opened on 1 June 1964 with wooden platforms and no more than a trailer for ticket sales. On 12 September 1968 a station building was opened; the current station building dates from 1996. Train services are operated by Nederlandse Spoorwegen.

== Train services ==
The following services call at Rotterdam Lombardijen:

- 4x per hour local service (sprinter) The Hague - Rotterdam - Dordrecht

== Bus and tram services ==
Several Rotterdam tram and bus lines call at the Rotterdam Lombardijen station. A tram stop is located just east of the station, where RET-lines 2 and 20 stop.

- 2 Charlois - Maashaven - Lombardijen - Keizerswaard
- 20 Rotterdam Centraal - Eendrachtsplein - Laan van Zuid - Feijenoord - Lombardijen
- 70 Charlois - Zuidplein - Slinge - Lombardijen - Keizerswaard
- 76 Zuidplein - Vreewijk - Lombardijen - Keizerswaard
- 92 Zuidplein - Lombardijen - Hendrik-Ido-Ambacht - Zwijndrecht - Dordrecht
- 143 Zuidplein - Lombardijen - Keizerswaard - P&R Beverwaard - Ridderkerk - Dordrecht
- 144 Zuidplein - Lombardijen - Keizerswaard - P&R Beverwaard - Bolnes - Slikkerveer - Ridderkerk
- 163 Lombardijen - Heinenoord - Oud Beijerland
- 183 Kralingse Zoom - Keizerswaard - Lombardijen - Barendrecht - Rhoon Portland - Zuidplein
- 191 Zuidplein - Lombardijen - Papendrecht - Sliedrecht
- 192 Zuidplein - Lombardijen - Rijsoord - Hendrik-Ido-Ambacht - Zwijndrecht - Dordrecht
- 283 Kralingse Zoom - Keizerswaard - Lombardijen - Barendrecht - Rhoon Portland - Zuidplein
- 663 Lombardijen - Heinenoord - Oud Beijerland - Piershil - Goudswaard

Previous	Line	Next
Molenvliet	Tram 2 Kromme Zandweg - Groene Tuin	Kreekhuizenlaan
Molenvliet	Tram 20; Centraal Station - Kreekhuizenlaan	Kreekhuizenlaan
