= Poortugaal metro station =

Metro station in Albrandswaard, Netherlands

Poortugaal
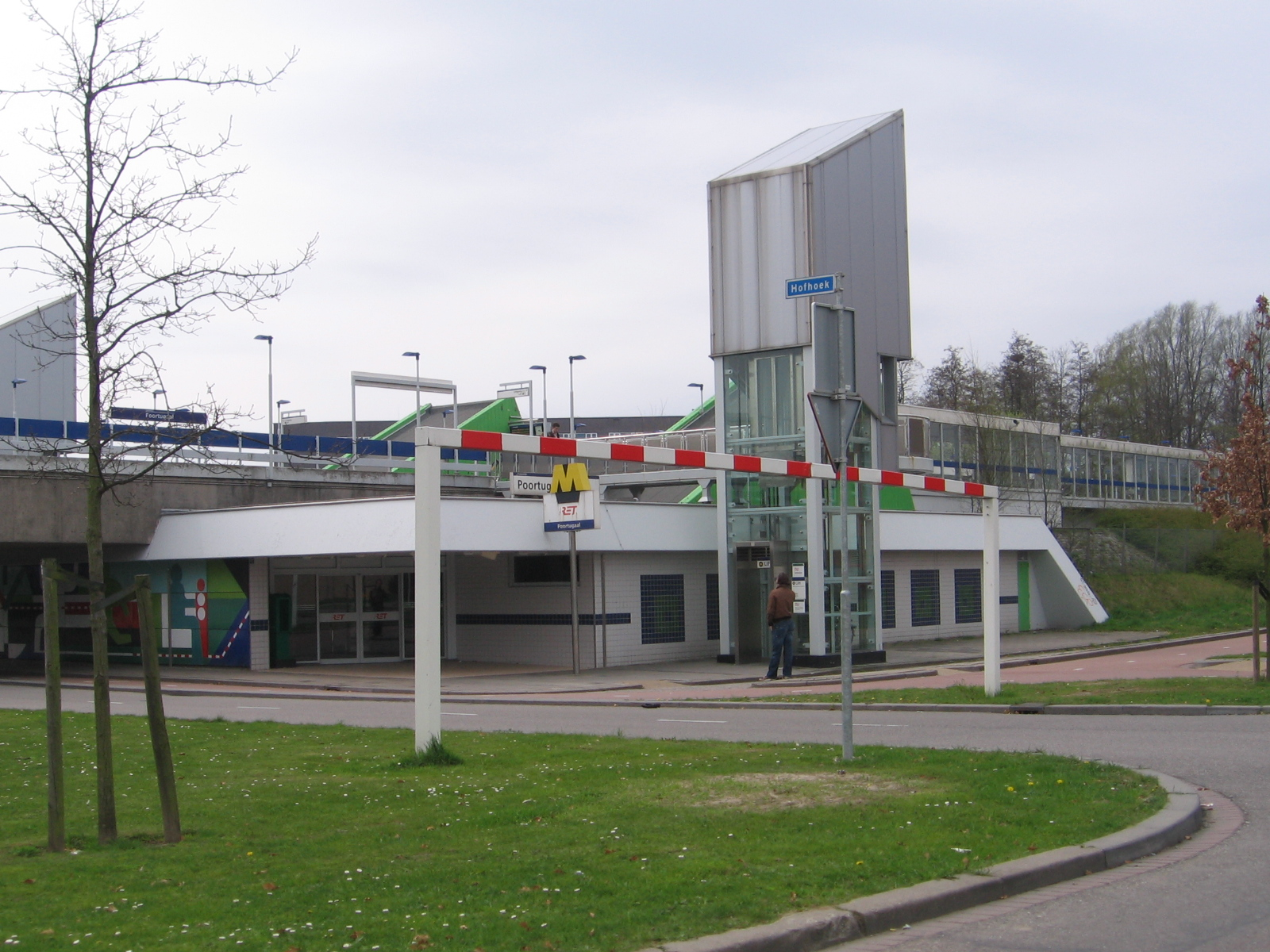

General information
- Coordinates: 51°51′42″N 4°23′45″E
- System: Rotterdam Metro station
- Owner: RET
- Platforms: Side platforms
- Tracks: 2

Construction
- Structure type: Elevated

History
- Opened: 1974

Services
Preceding station	Rotterdam Metro	Following station
Tussenwater towards De Akkers	Line D	Rhoon towards Rotterdam Centraal
Location

Poortugaal is an above-ground subway station of Rotterdam Metro line D. The station is located in Poortugaal, a village in the municipality Albrandswaard to the southwest of Rotterdam. It is located north of the village centre of Poortugaal.

The station was opened on 25 October 1974. On that date, the North-South Line was extended from its former terminus, Slinge, towards Zalmplaat station. The Poortugaal and Zalmplaat station share the same design though mirrored. As a less busy station it is only equipped with one escalator located at the platform with the most upward motions, which as this is an above ground station, is the platform towards the centre on the south side.

Right outside the station, passengers can get on RET-operated bus lines 79 and 602.
