= Zuidplein metro station =

Metro station in Rotterdam, the Netherlands

Zuidplein
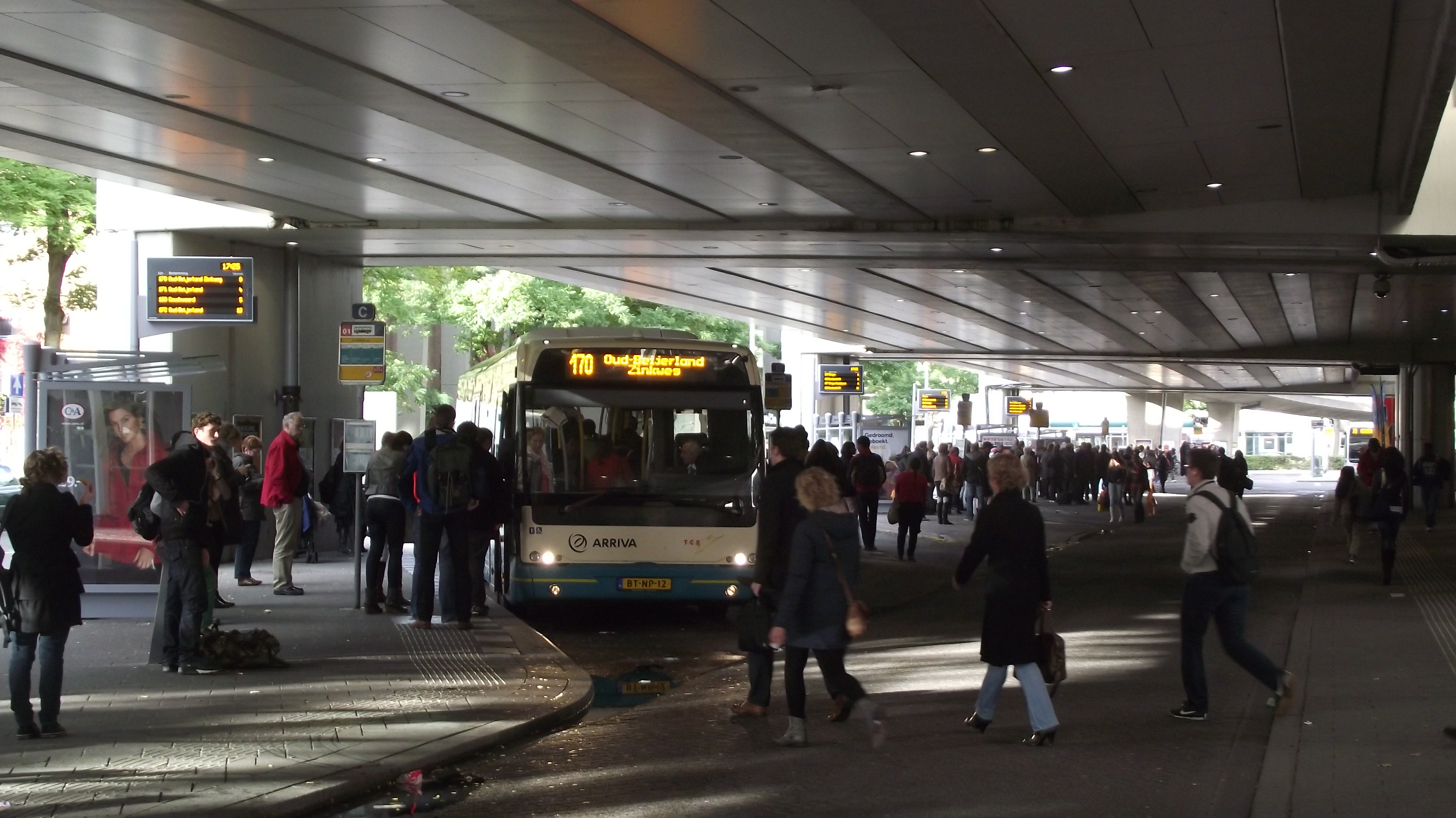

General information
- Coordinates: 51°53′13″N 4°29′19″E
- System: Rotterdam Metro station
- Owner: RET
- Platforms: Side platforms
- Tracks: 2

Construction
- Structure type: Elevated

History
- Opened: 1968

Services
Preceding station	Rotterdam Metro	Following station
Slinge towards De Akkers	Line D	Maashaven towards Rotterdam Centraal
Slinge Terminus	Line E	Maashaven towards Den Haag Centraal
Location

Zuidplein is an above-ground metro station in the south of the city of Rotterdam, Netherlands. It is part of Rotterdam Metro lines D and E.

The station opened on 9 February 1968, on the same date that the North-South Line (also formerly called Erasmus line), of which it is a part, was opened. It served as the southern terminus of the line until 25 November 1970, when a one-station extension to Slinge was opened.

Zuidplein station is located immediately adjacent to a large shopping centre of the same name. Rotterdam Ahoy, the largest multipurpose arena on Netherlands is also within walking distance of the station. A bus station is located directly underneath the metro station, providing access to local bus services.

== 1989 murders ==
On 6 March 1989, a man stabbed four women, three fatally, in a rampage inside Zuidplein station. The suspect, 28-year-old Glenn M., targeted white women after his white Dutch girlfriend left him. The assailant was arrested and died by suicide in prison in 1992.
