= Barendrecht railway station =

Railway station in the Netherlands

Barendrecht
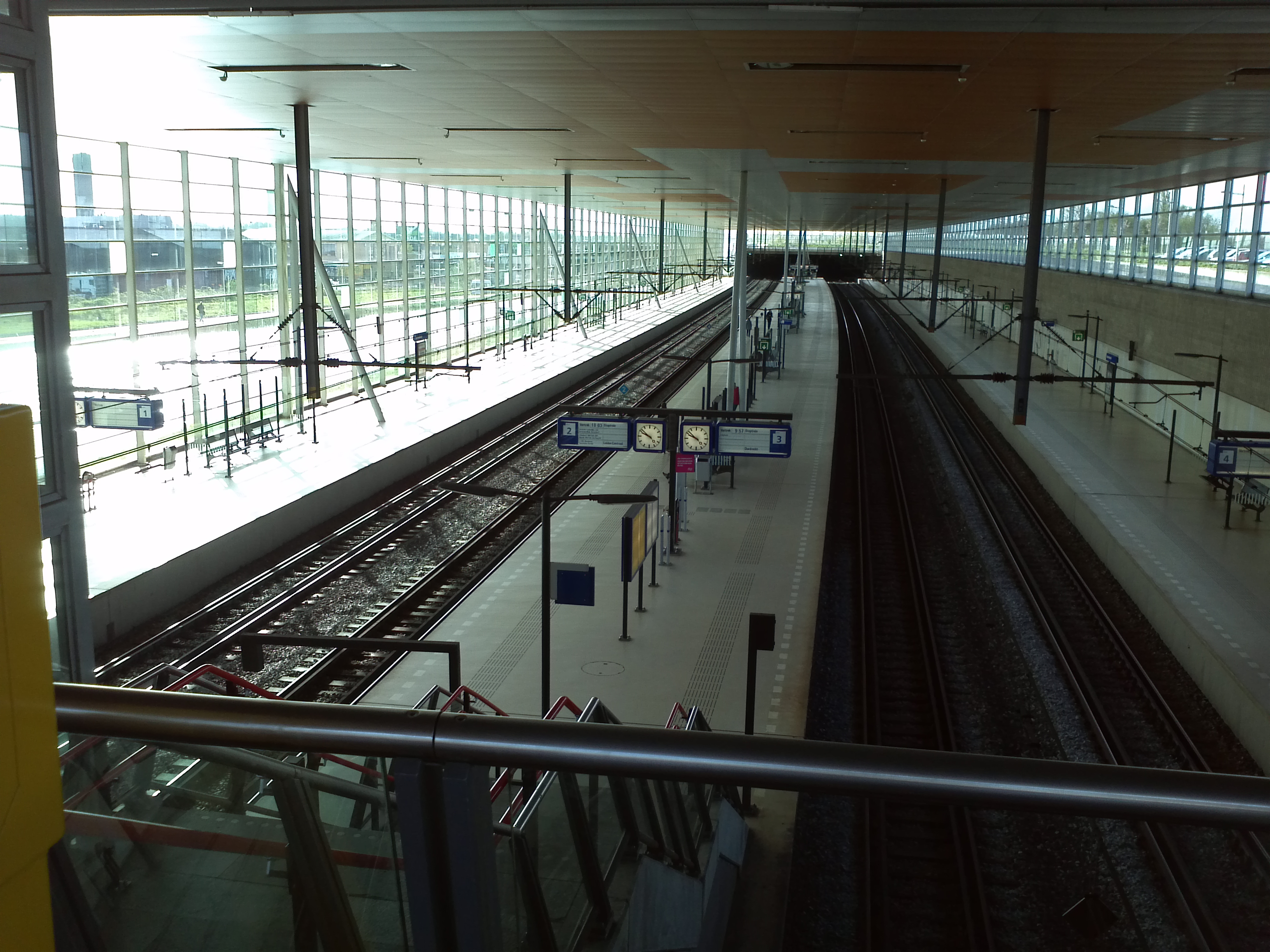
- Tracks and platforms in Barendrecht station

General information
- Location: Stationsweg 1, Barendrecht, Netherlands
- Coordinates: 51°51′16″N 4°33′13″E
- Operator: Nederlandse Spoorwegen
- Line: Breda–Rotterdam railway
- Platforms: 4
- Tracks: 9
- Connections: Bus connections

Construction
- Accessible: yes

Other information
- Station code: Brd

History
- Opened: 1 November 1872
- Rebuilt: 16 June 2007

Services
Preceding station	Nederlandse Spoorwegen	Following station
Rotterdam Lombardijen towards Den Haag Centraal	NS Sprinter 5000 Mon-Fri until 20:00	Zwijndrecht towards Dordrecht
Rotterdam Lombardijen towards Den Haag Centraal	NS Sprinter 5100	Zwijndrecht towards Dordrecht
Rotterdam Lombardijen towards Den Haag Centraal	NS Sprinter 5200 Mon-Thu until 19:00	Zwijndrecht towards Dordrecht
Location
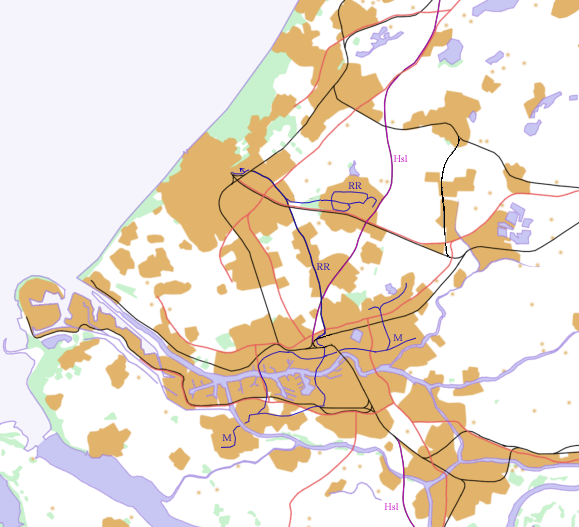
- Location within Southwest Randstad Location within Netherlands

Barendrecht railway station is a railway station in Barendrecht, Netherlands, located on the Breda–Rotterdam railway between Rotterdam and Dordrecht. Adjacent to the four tracks of this line are two tracks for the HSL-Zuid and three for freight, as part of the Betuweroute freight route to Zevenaar. The nine tracks are in a 1.5 kilometers (0.93 mi) long roofed structure, much of it covered under a layer of earth, to keep noise at bay. On top is a new city park. At the station itself its four tracks, with the platforms, have a glass roof.

The station was opened on 1 November 1872. This building was replaced by a smaller and more modern building in 1973. A new railway station was opened in 2001. Queen Beatrix visited the station on 16 June 2007, to open the Betuweroute freight route.

== Train services ==
The following services call at Barendrecht:

- 6x per hour local services (sprinter) The Hague - Rotterdam - Dordrecht

== Bus services ==
- 84 (Station Barendrecht - Rotterdam Zuidplein) - QBuzz, 4x per hour, 2x per hour on Sundays
- 188 (Station Barendrecht - Industrial Area Barendrecht) - Monday to Friday from roof of the station
- 187 (Barendrecht Handelsweg - Station Barendrecht - Rotterdam Zuidplein) - Rush hour only. 2x per hour towards Barendrecht in the morning, 2x per hour towards Rotterdam in the afternoon.
- 601 (Rotterdam Beverwaard - Station Barendrecht - Barendrecht Gemeentehuis) - Does not run in the evening and on Sundays.
- 717 (Station Barendrecht - Heerjansdam - Zwijndrecht) - Arriva, 1x per hour, at Sundays on request
