= Albrandswaard =

- Municipality
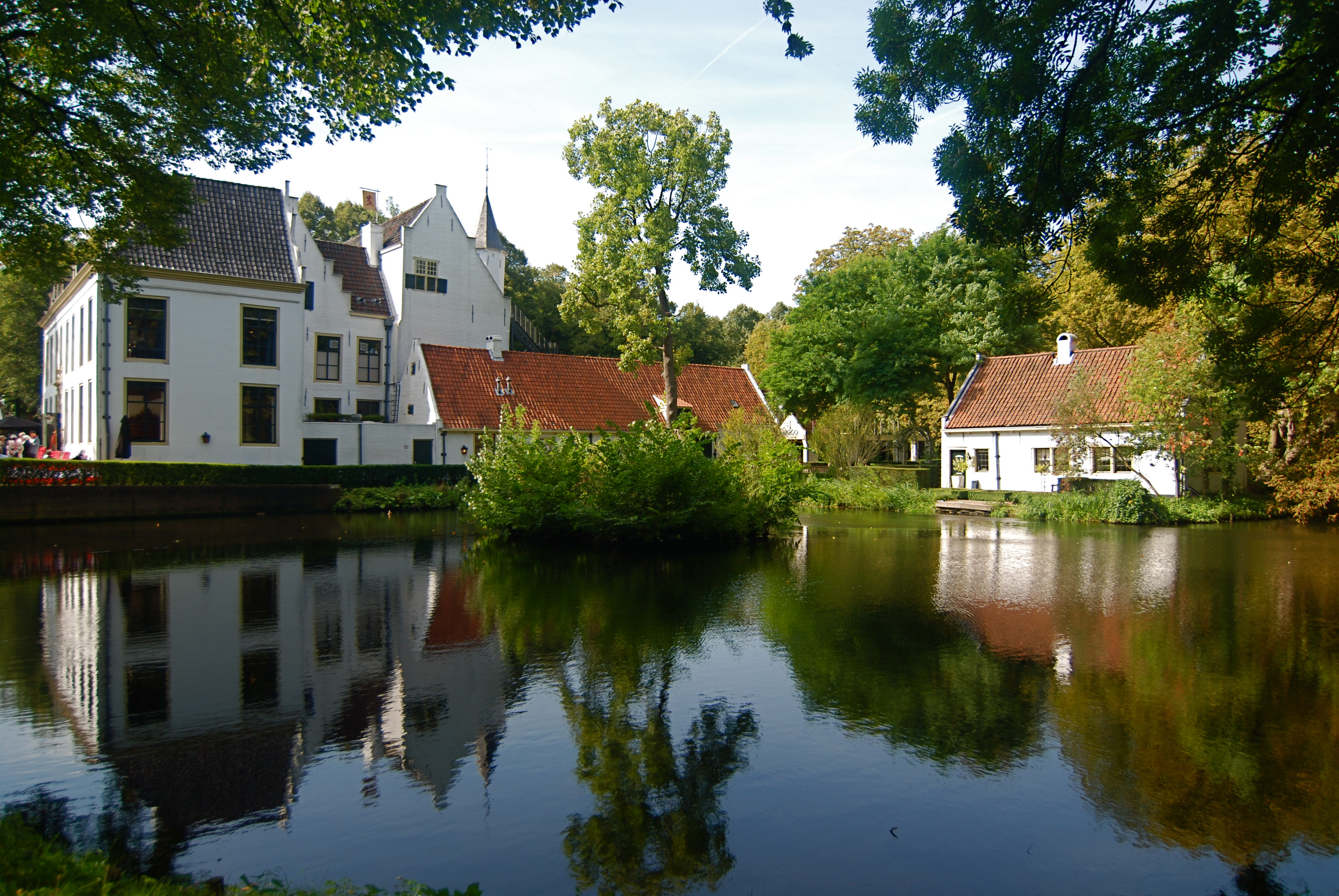
- Castle of Rhoon

- Flag Coat of arms

- Location in South Holland
- Coordinates: 51°52′N 4°24′E
- Country: Netherlands
- Province: South Holland

Government
  - Body: Municipal council
  - Mayor: Cees Pille (VVD)

Area
  - Total: 23.76 km^{2} (9.17 sq mi)
  - Land: 21.69 km^{2} (8.37 sq mi)
  - Water: 2.07 km^{2} (0.80 sq mi)
- Elevation: 0 m (0 ft)

Population (January 2021)
  - Total: 25,814
  - Density: 1,190/km^{2} (3,100/sq mi)
- Demonym: Albrandswaarder
- Time zone: UTC+1 (CET)
  - Summer (DST): UTC+2 (CEST)
- Postcode: 3160–3176
- Area code: 010
- Website: www.albrandswaard.nl

Albrandswaard (Dutch: [ˌɑlbrɑntsˈʋaːrt]) is a municipality in the western Netherlands, in the province of South Holland. The municipality had a population of 25,814 as of 2021, and covers an area of 23.76 km^{2} (9.17 sq mi) of which 2.07 km^{2} (0.80 sq mi) is water.

The municipality of Albrandswaard consists of the villages of Poortugaal in the west and Rhoon in the east. They were separate municipalities until 1985. The name was taken from the historic municipality of Albrandswaard en Kijvelanden, which existed until 1842, when it joined Poortugaal. Albrandswaard actually is a polder located between Rhoon and Poortugaal.

Both villages have a metro station on Rotterdam Metro line D (Poortugaal station and Rhoon station), which connect them to Rotterdam and to the main railway network from Rotterdam Centraal in the east, and to Hoogvliet and Spijkenisse in the west.

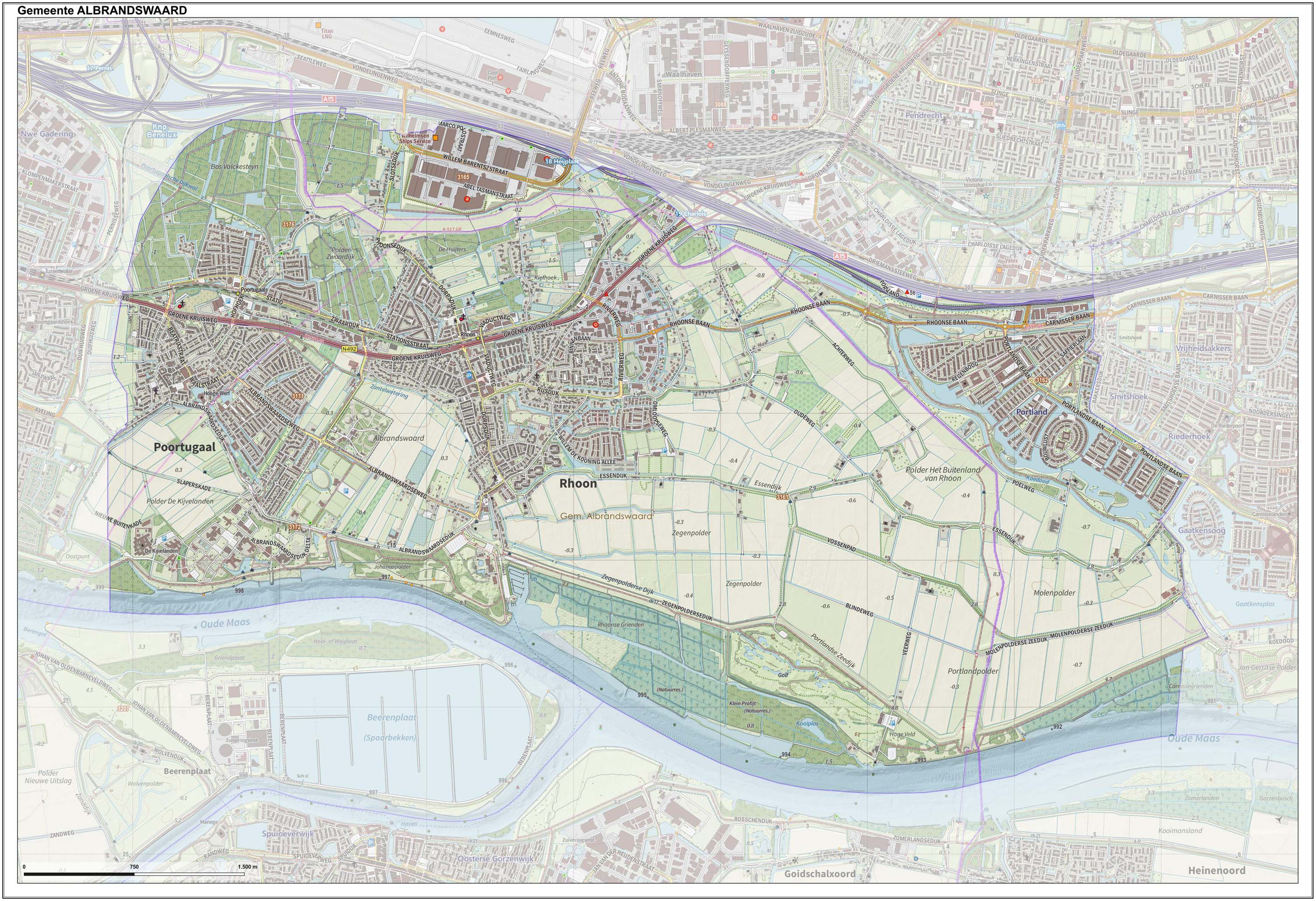
Topographic map of the municipality of Albrandswaard, September 2014

== Notable people ==
- Hendrik Swalmius (1577 in Rhoon – 1649), a theologian painted by Frans Hals
- Eleazar Swalmius (1582 in Rhoon – 1652), a theologian painted by Rembrandt
- Mattheus Marinus Schepman (1847 in Rhoon – 1919), a malacologist
- Hesterine de Reus (born 1961 in Poortugaal), a former soccer player and coach
- Alexander Pechtold (born 1965), a former politician and art historian; grew up in Rhoon
- Sander Fischer (born 1988 in Rhoon), a professional footballer with over 300 club caps

== Gallery ==
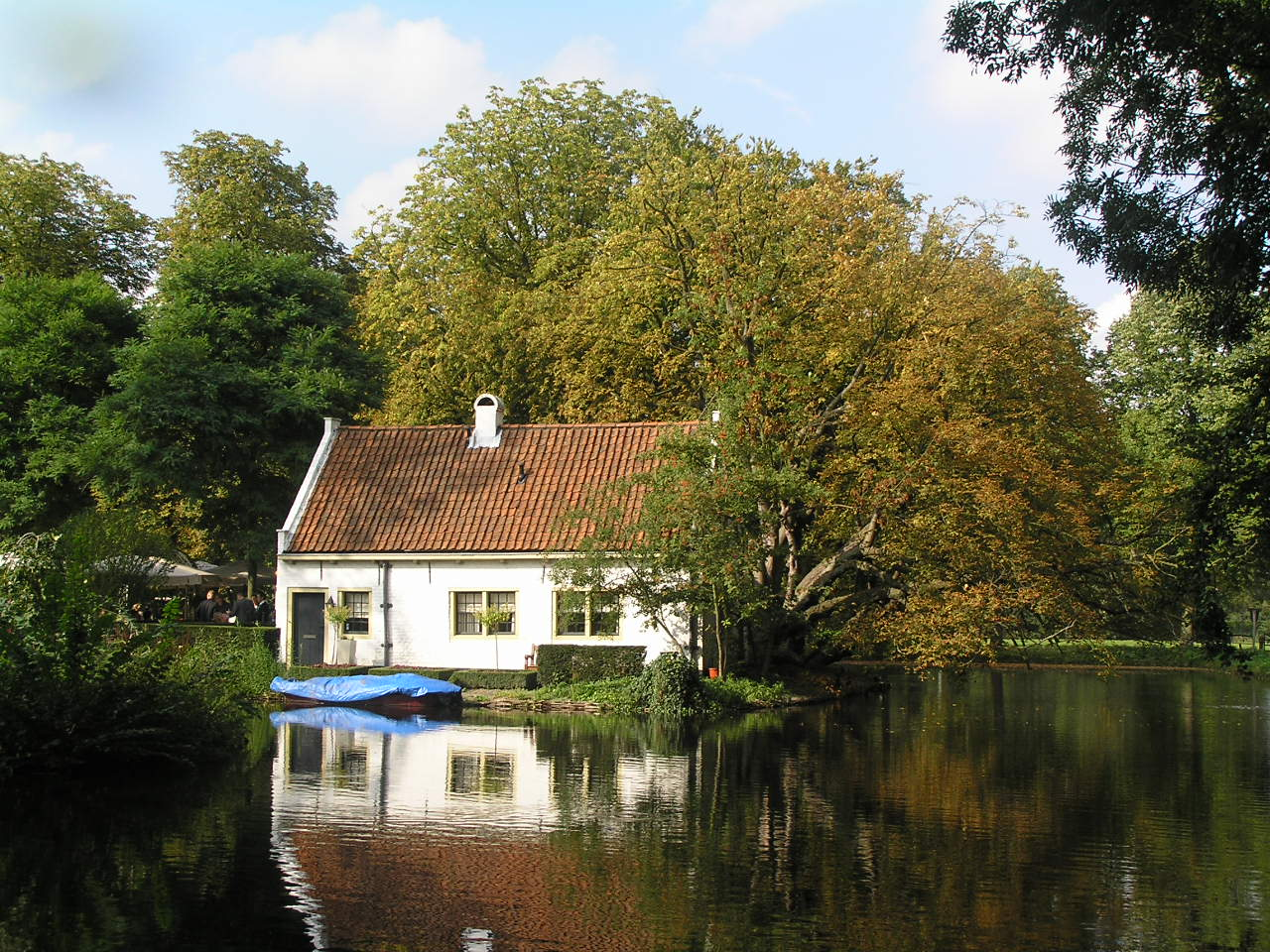
Kasteel van Rhoon Bijgebouw

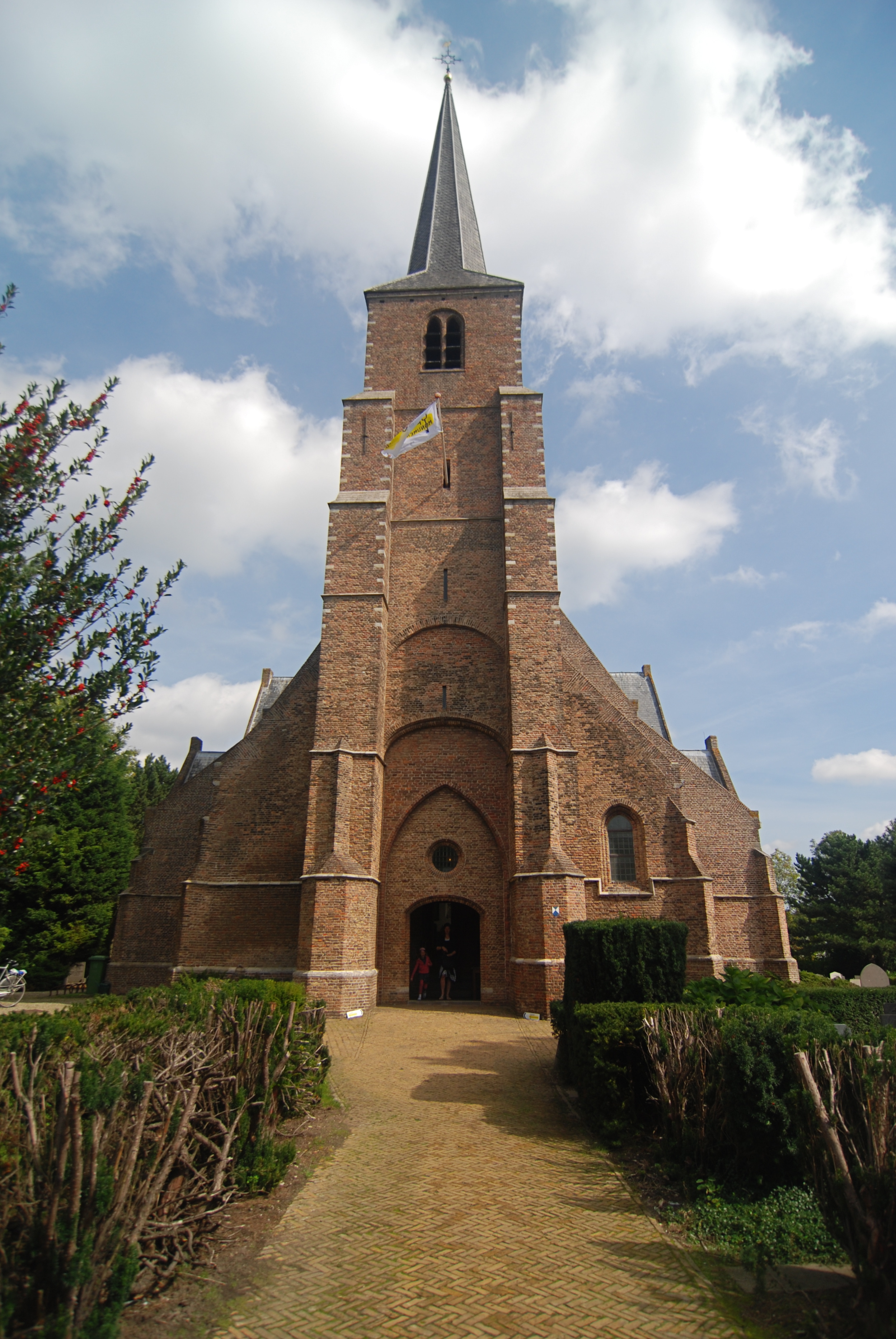
Hervormde Kerk, Poortugaal

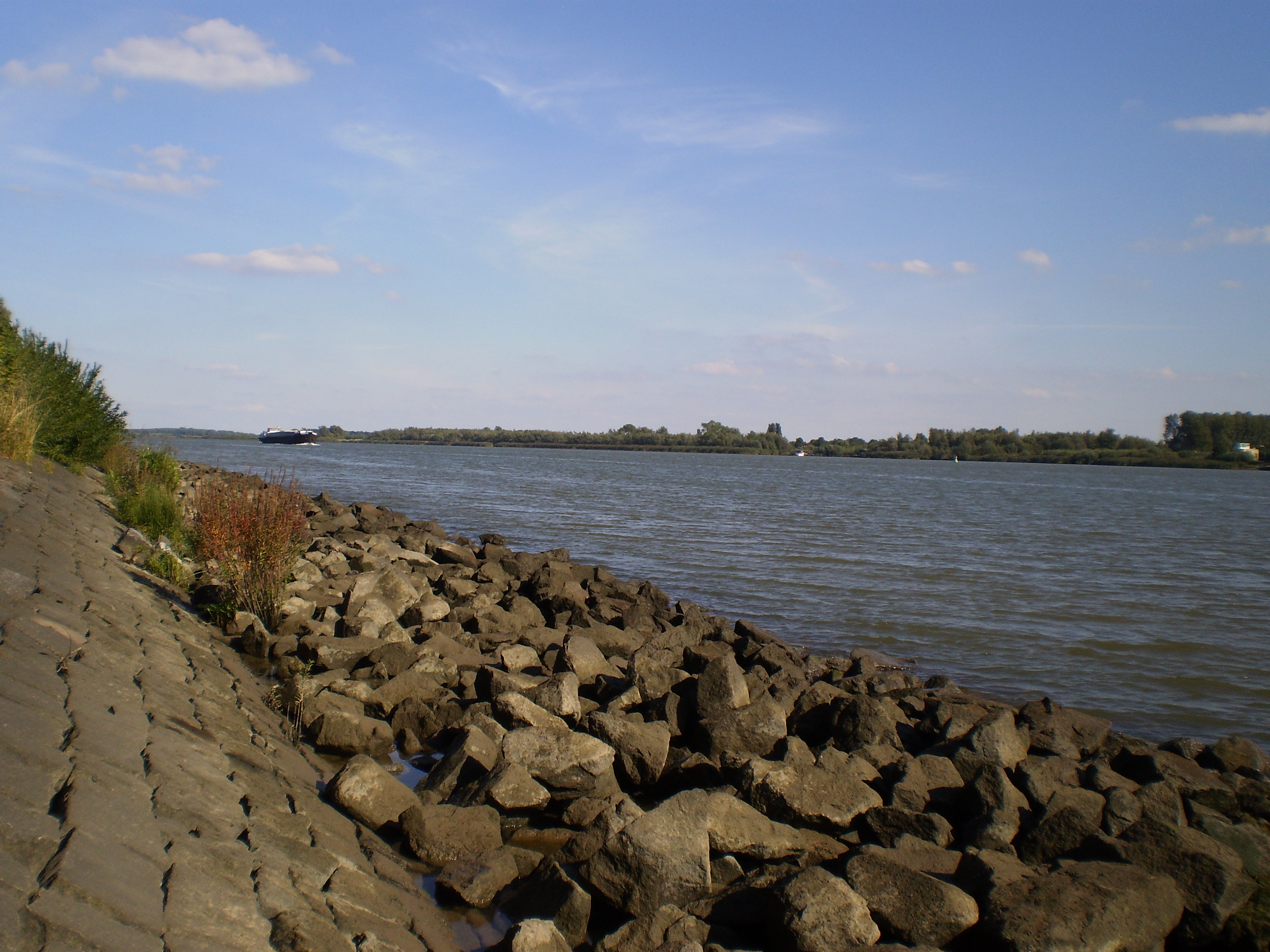
De Oude Maas ter hoogte van Heinenoord

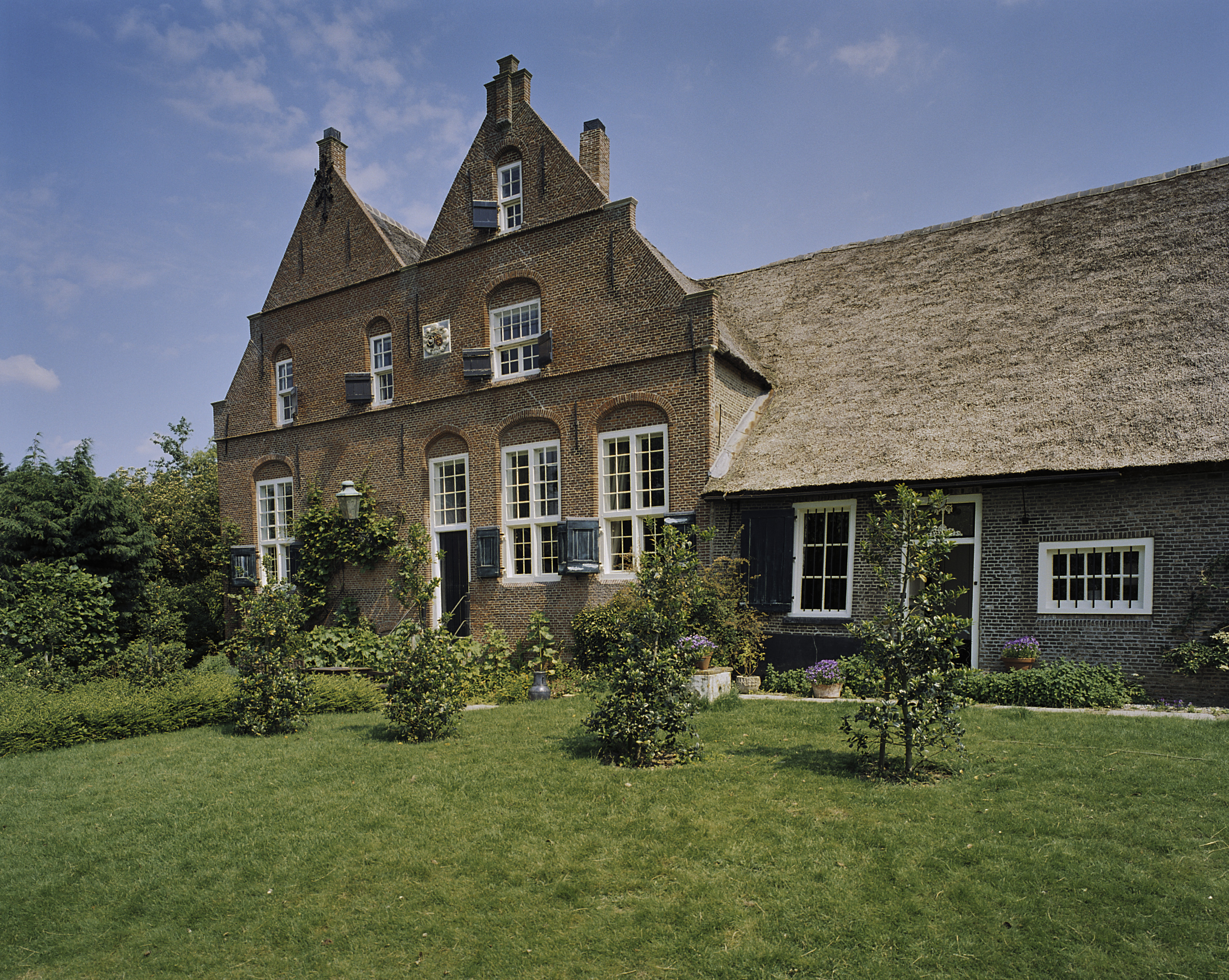
Overzicht voorgevel met toppilasters - Rhoon
