= Poortugaal =

Village in the Netherlands

- Village
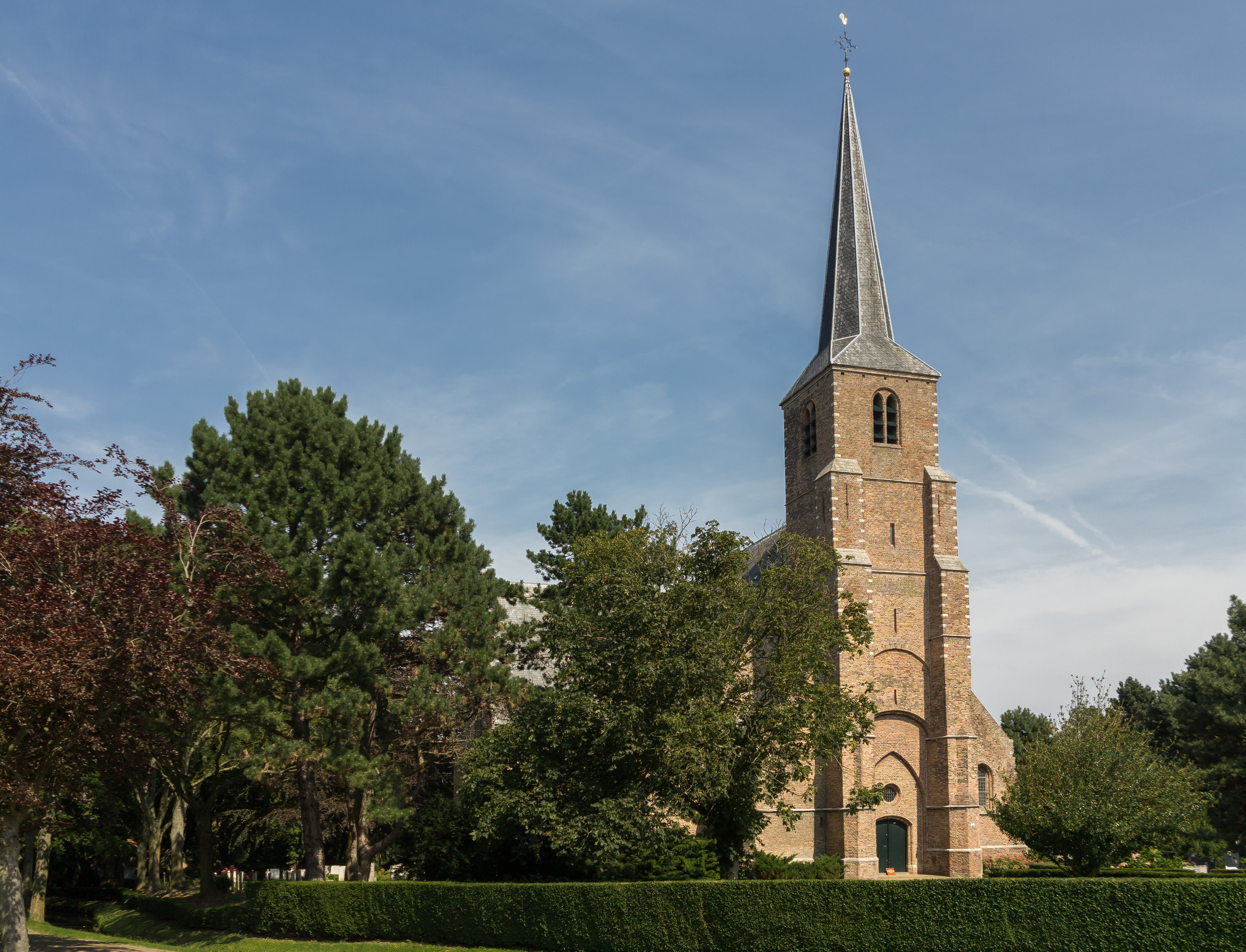
- Dorpskerk (village church)

- Flag Coat of arms

- Location in the province of South Holland in the Netherlands Location in the Netherlands
- Country: Netherlands
- Province: South Holland
- Municipality: Albrandswaard
- Established: 15th century

Area
  - Total: 746 km^{2} (288 sq mi)
  - Land: 702 km^{2} (271 sq mi)
  - Water: 044 km^{2} (17 sq mi)

Population (2021)
  - Total: 9.555
  - Density: 1.281/km^{2} (3.32/sq mi)
- Time zone: UTC+1 (CET)
- Postcode: 3171 - 3176
- Dialing code: 010

Poortugaal (Dutch pronunciation: [poːr.tʏ.ɣaːl]) is a village (dorp) that is situated near the municipality of Rotterdam in the South Holland province of the Netherlands. Together with neighbouring Rhoon, Poortugaal forms the municipality of Albrandswaard.

The village was first established in 15th century, following a royal land grant by the Spanish Netherlands to their local feudal vassals and supporters among the Dutch nobility. A Catholic church, a symbol of permanent settlements in the past, that dates to that period is found in the village centre.

The origin of the name, Poortugaal, and its presumed connection to the Kingdom of Portugal or the Portuguese is unclear. One theory links the similarity of Portugal's and Poortugaal's flags and coat of arms as an indication of local settlers' paying homage to fellow crusaders who were from Portugal. Older depictions of the coat of arms also show a shield that resembles the coat of arms of Portugal even more than the current coat of arms of Poortugaal. The village flag is derived from the municipal coat of arms. The blue star is taken from the stars on the shields, which are shown without stars on the flag in the simplified coat of arms. The layout of the flag is thus very reminiscent of the flag of Kingdom of Portugal and the modern Portuguese flag.

Since January 1, 1985, Poortugaal has been part of the municipality of Albrandswaard together with Rhoon.

The village has a connection to the Rotterdam by Rotterdam Metro line D, through the Poortugaal station.

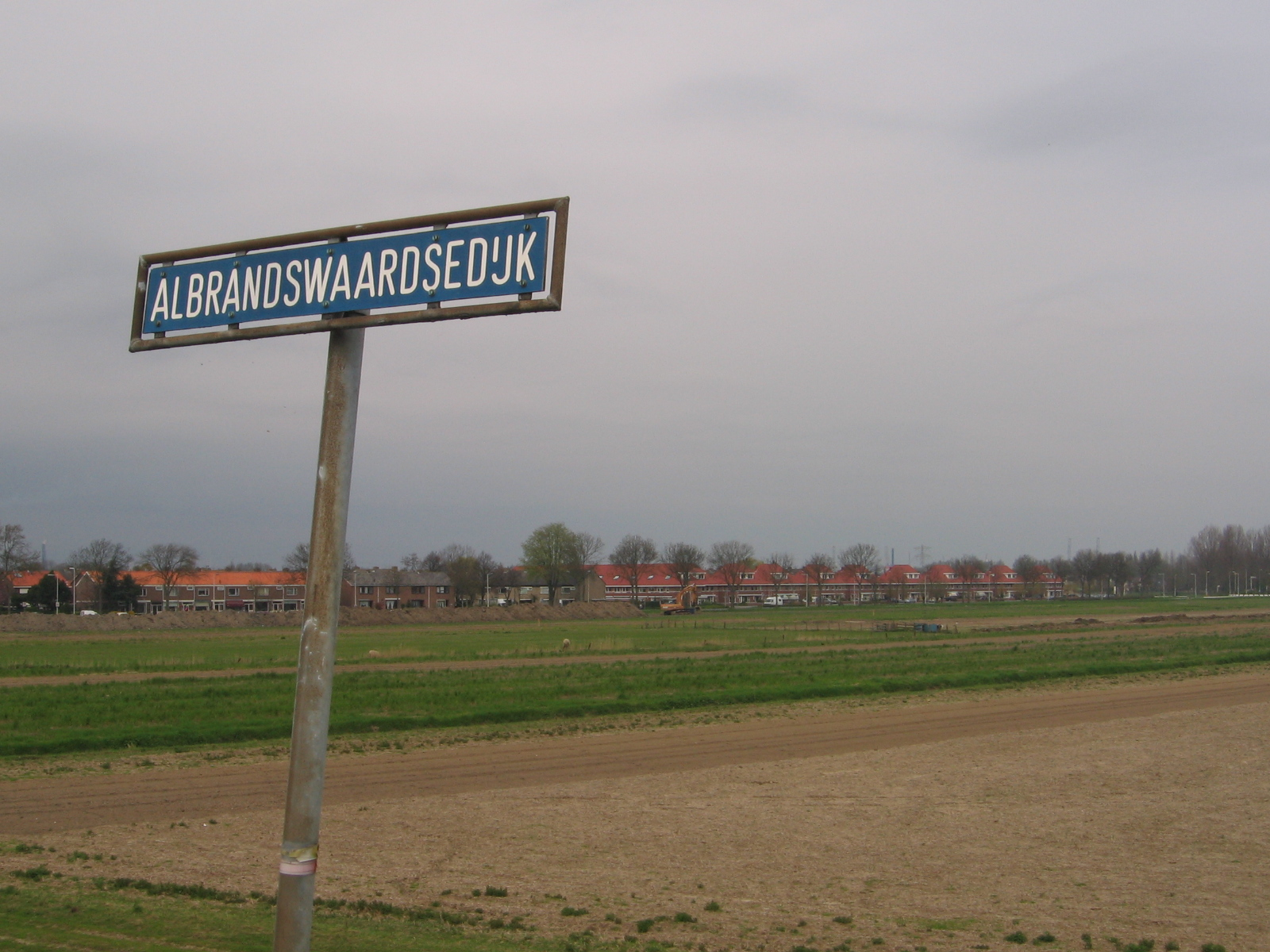
View of Poortugaal.
