= De Esch =

Coordinates: 51°54′22″N 4°31′50″E

- Neighborhood of Rotterdam
- Interactive map of De Esch
- Country: Netherlands
- Province: South Holland
- COROP: Rotterdam
- Borough: Kralingen-Crooswijk
- Time zone: UTC+1 (CET)

De Esch is a neighborhood of Rotterdam, Netherlands.
