= Beverwaard =

Coordinates: 51°53′35″N 4°34′05″E

- Neighborhood of Rotterdam
- Interactive map of Beverwaard
- Country: Netherlands
- Province: South Holland
- COROP: Rotterdam
- Borough: IJsselmonde

Population
  - Total: 12.005
- Time zone: UTC+1 (CET)

Beverwaard is a neighborhood of Rotterdam, Netherlands.
