= Rhoon =

- Village
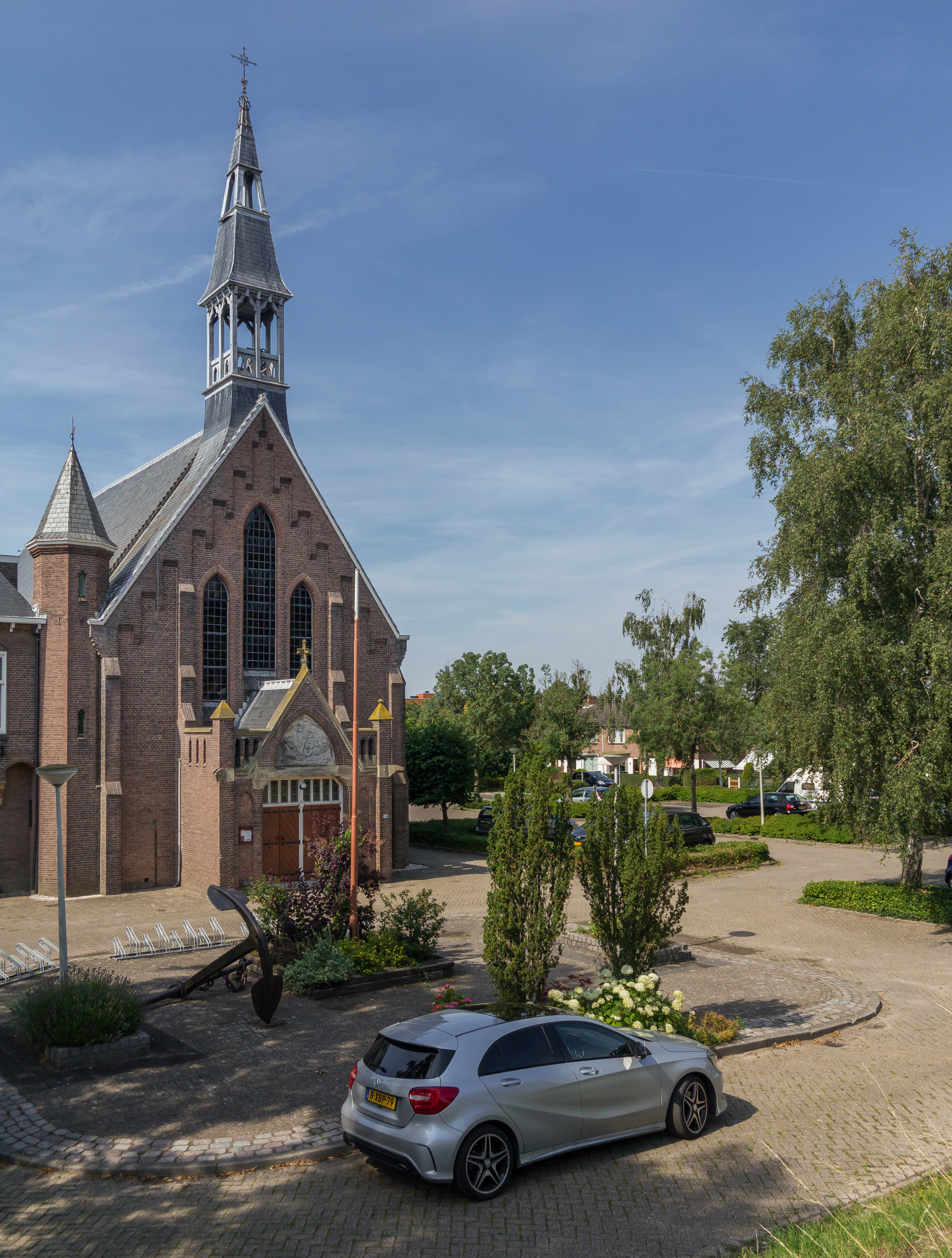
- Church: de Sint Willibrorduskerk

- Flag Coat of arms

- Location in the province of South Holland in the Netherlands Location in the Netherlands
- Country: Netherlands
- Province: South Holland
- Municipality: Albrandswaard
- Established: 1199
- Founder: Lords of Duiveland
- Time zone: UTC+1 (CET)

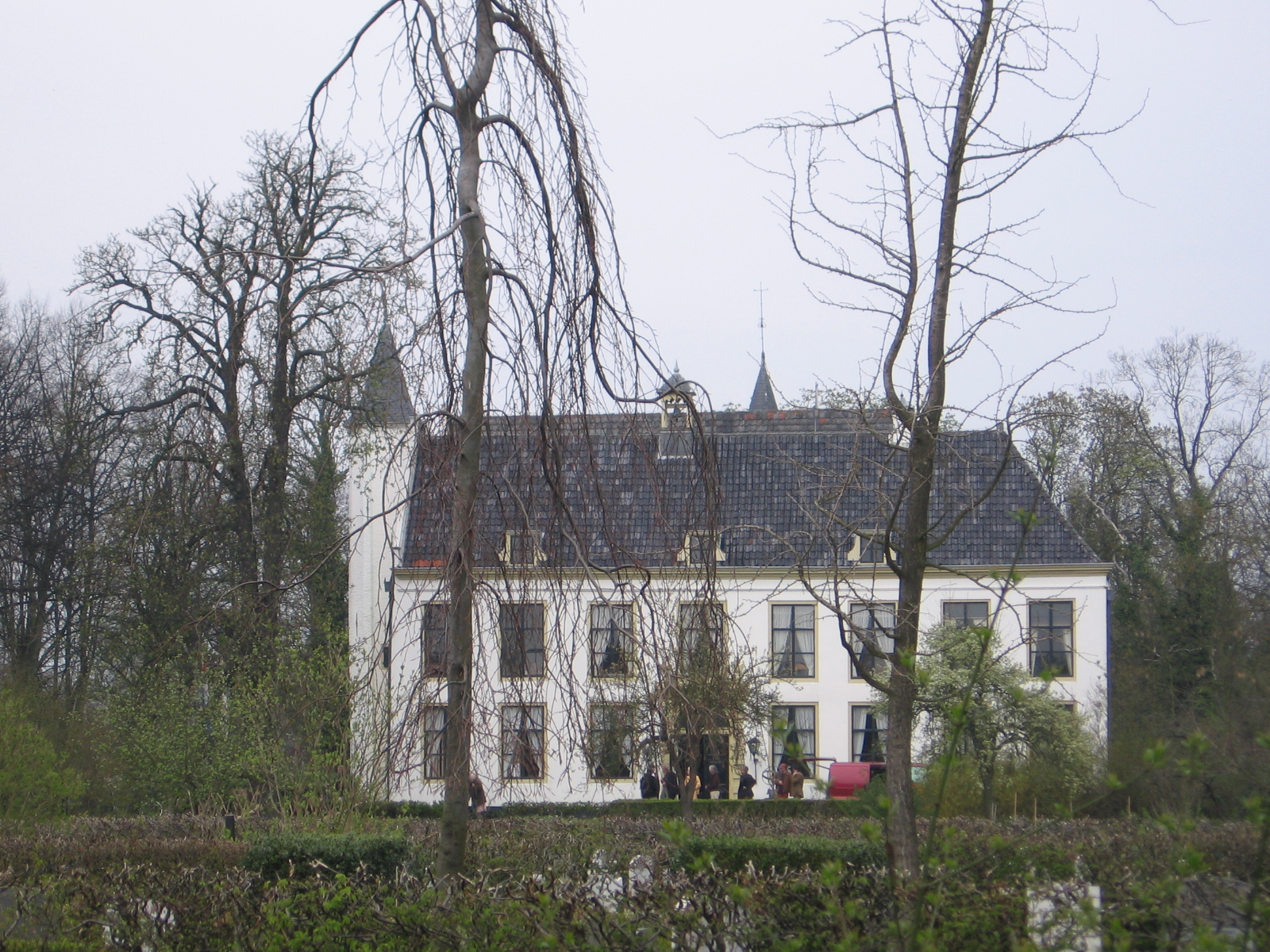
Castle Rhoon

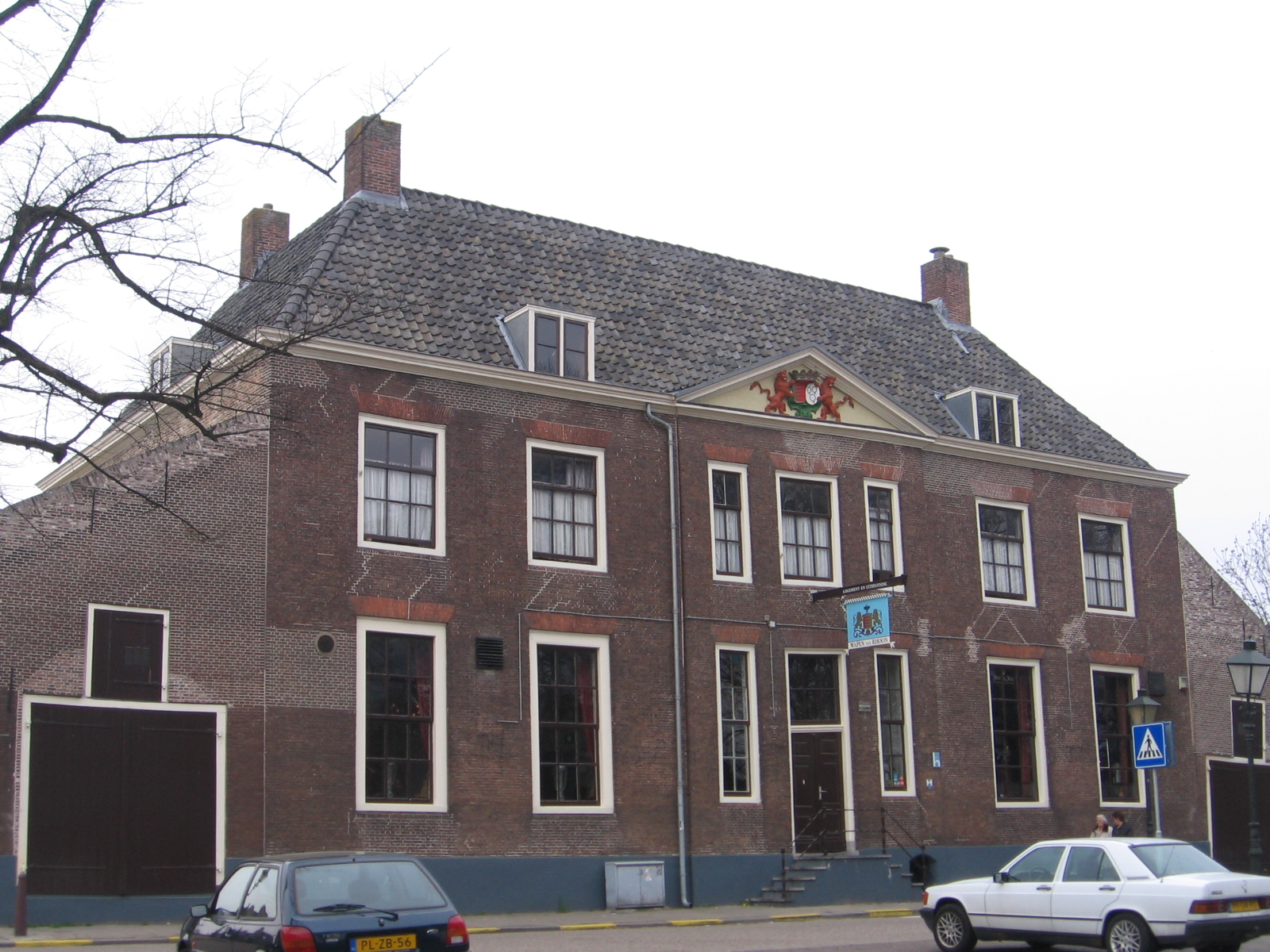

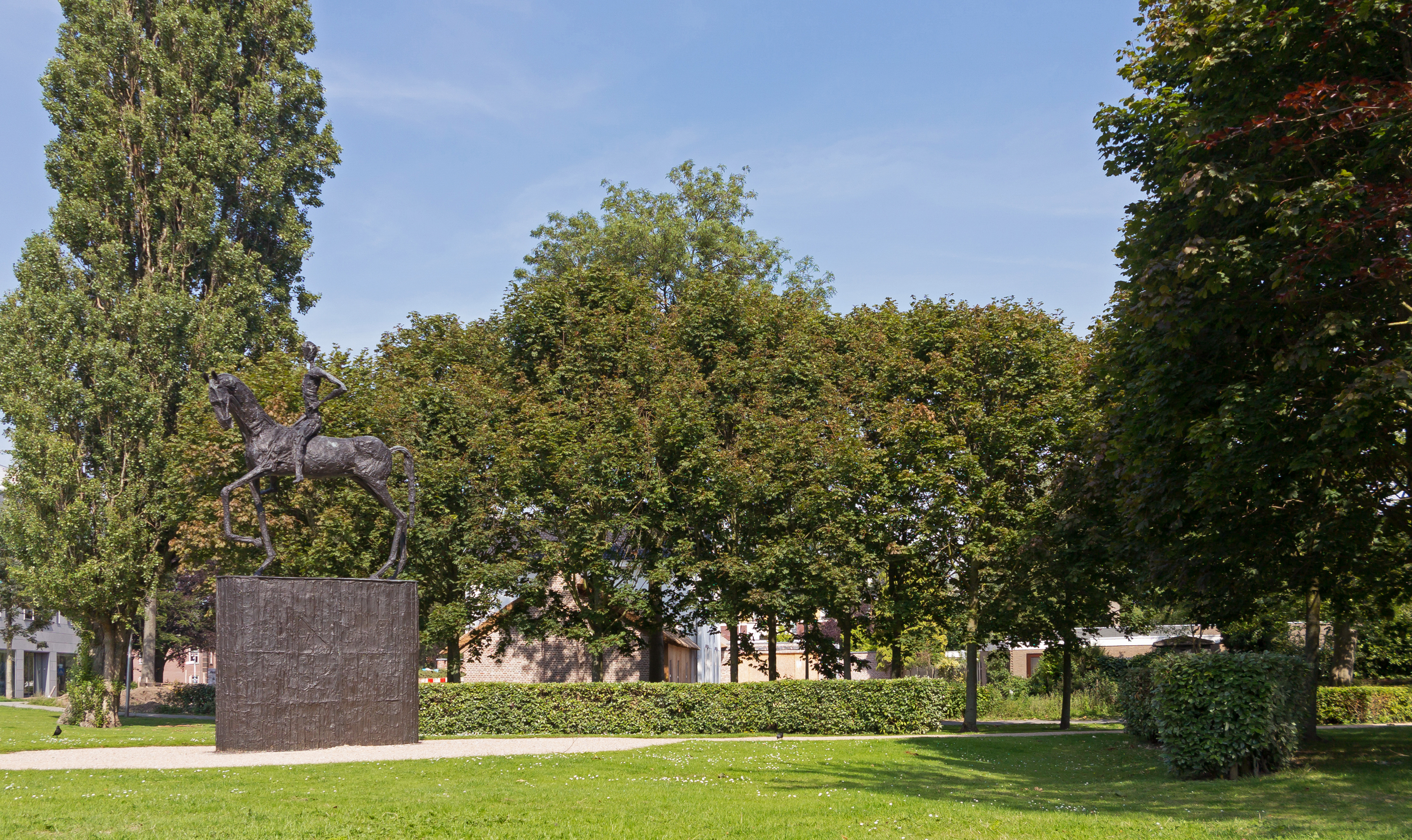
Sculpture in Rhoon

Rhoon is a village that borders the municipality of the city of Rotterdam, South Holland, the Netherlands.

According to its history it was established in 1199 and was ruled by the lords of Duiveland. In the 14th century the village was struck by many floods.

In the last big flood, the North Sea flood of 1953, the Dutch government implemented the "deltawerken" (Delta Works). This is a large protection barrier of dikes and dams to keep the water of the North Sea out during high tides. In 1969 Rhoon also became part of this plan and a large dike was established around the island of IJsselmonde.

Rhoon is part of the island of IJsselmonde and situated in the south of this island. On the lands outside the dikes is a small yacht marina on the banks of the river Oude Maas, and also a "griend" which is a tidal forest. The river Oude Maas has a tidal difference of around 1.2 meter in a twice daily cycle.

Since 1 January 1985, the village has been part of the municipality of Albrandswaard together with Poortugaal.

The village has a connection to the city of Rotterdam by Rotterdam Metro line D, through Rhoon station.

In Rhoon is the Dutch Consulate General of Ireland.
