= Vlaardingen Oost metro station =

Metro station in Vlaardingen, the Netherlands

Vlaardingen Oost
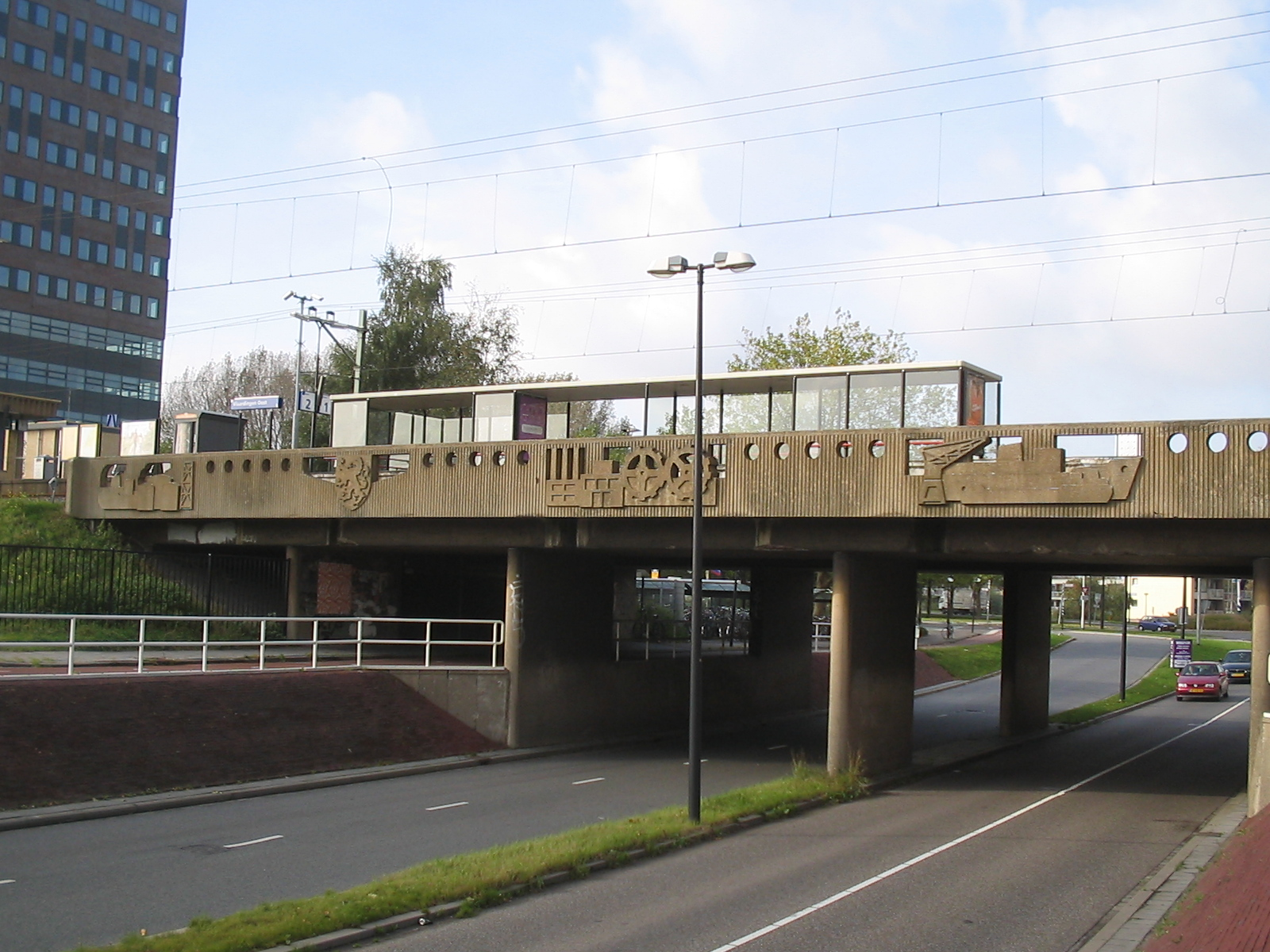

General information
- Location: Netherlands
- Coordinates: 51°54′37″N 4°21′43″E
- System: Rotterdam Metro station
- Line: Schiedam–Hoek van Holland railway
- Platforms: 1 island platform
- Tracks: 2

History
- Opened: 17 August 1891
- Closed: 1 April 2017
- Rebuilt: 30 September 2019

Services
Preceding station	Rotterdam Metro	Following station
Vlaardingen Centrum towards Vlaardingen West	Line A Not on evenings and early weekend mornings	Schiedam Nieuwland towards Binnenhof
Vlaardingen Centrum towards Hoek van Holland Strand	Line B	Schiedam Nieuwland towards Nesselande
Location
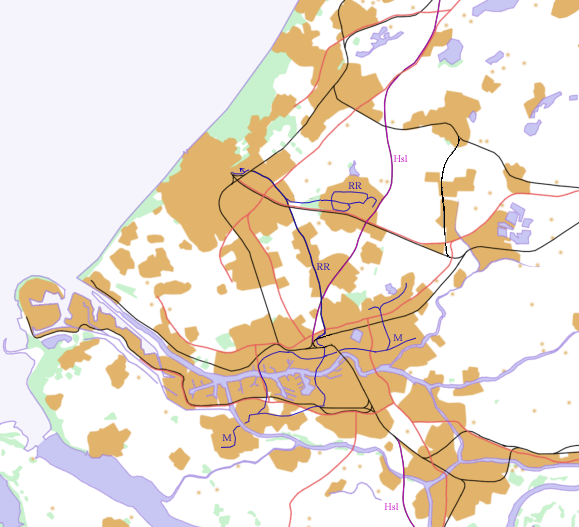
- Location within Southwest Randstad Location within Netherlands

Vlaardingen Oost is a metro station in Vlaardingen in the Netherlands. Located on the Hoekse Lijn, it is served by RET Metro Line B at all times, and Line A during peak periods.

== History ==
Vlaardingen Oost was opened on 17 August 1891 as a local railway station on the Hoekse Lijn.

The Nederlandse Spoorwegen stopped operating the line, including the Vlaardingen Oost railway station, on 1 April 2017 to enable conversion for metro train operations. The station was reopened by RET on 30 September 2019, with preview services operating on 28 September. The station is still accessible for diesel trains, because nearby companies still require trains to deliver supplies.

The station was one of the first railway stations in The Netherlands to be built on a bridge.

== Metro services ==
As of 2019, Vlaardingen Oost is served by 6 trains per hour on RET Metro Line B, of which 3 per hour travel the full length of the route, and 3 travel only as far as Steendijkpolder.

During peak periods, the station is also served by 6 trains per hour on Line A, which travel as far as Vlaardingen West.

== Bus services ==
Bus services are operated by RET.

Bus services with stops on Vlaardingen Oost
Line	Route	Via	Details
56	Vlaardingen West - Holy-Noord	Vlaardingen Oost, Overdrevenpad	
126	Station Schiedam Centrum - Maassluis West	Vijfsluizen, Vlaardingen Oost, Maasland Viaduct	Not on Sundays.
127	Vlaardingen Oost - Vijfsluizen		Weekdays only.
156	Vlaardingen West - Holy-Noord	Vlaardingen Oost, Jean Monnetring	Not on Sundays.
B2	Rotterdam Centraal - Rotterdam Centraal	Vijfsluizen, Vlaardingen Oost, Vlaardingen West	Friday- and Saturday nights only.
