= Schiedam Nieuwland metro station =

Metro station in Schiedam, the Netherlands

Schiedam Nieuwland
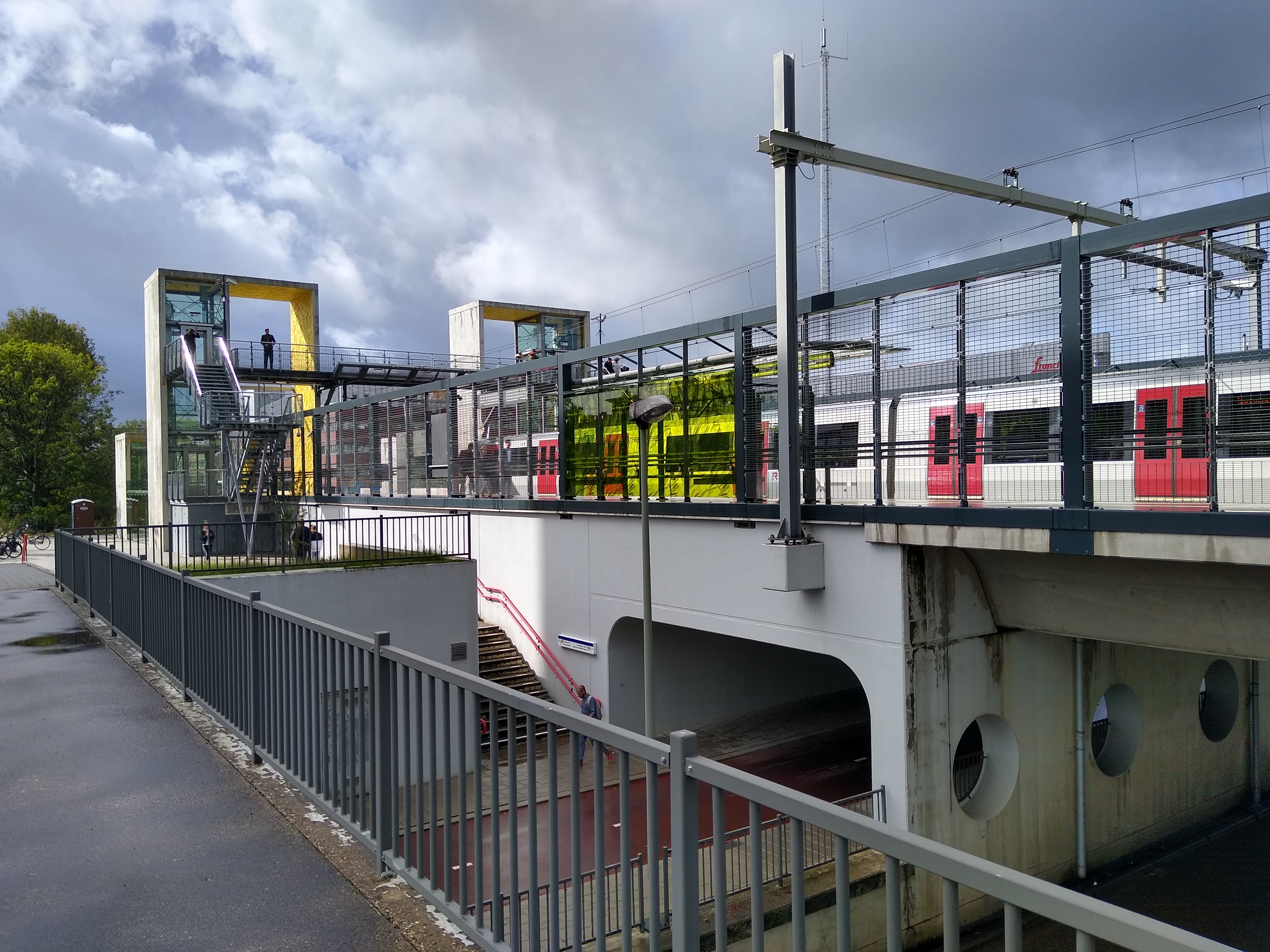

General information
- Location: Netherlands
- Coordinates: 51°55′20″N 4°22′58″E
- System: Rotterdam Metro station
- Line: Schiedam–Hoek van Holland railway

History
- Opened: 1 June 1975
- Closed: 1 April 2017
- Rebuilt: 30 September 2019

Services
Preceding station	Rotterdam Metro	Following station
Vlaardingen Oost towards Vlaardingen West	Line A Not on evenings and early weekend mornings	Schiedam Centrum towards Binnenhof
Vlaardingen Oost towards Hoek van Holland Strand	Line B	Schiedam Centrum towards Nesselande
Location
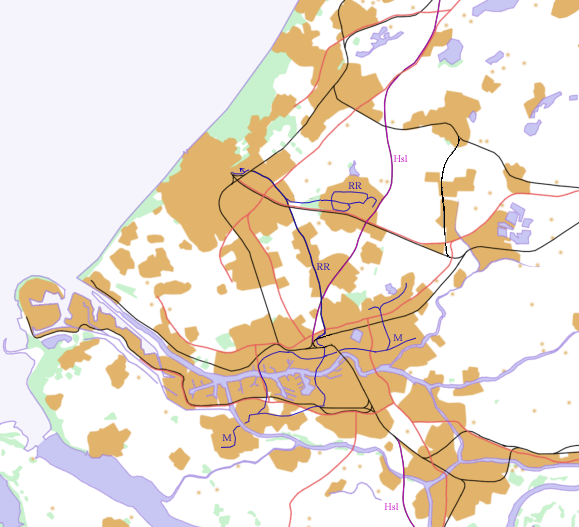
- Location within Southwest Randstad Location within Netherlands

Schiedam Nieuwland is a metro station in Schiedam in the Netherlands. Located on the Hoekse Lijn, it is served by RET Metro Line B at all times, and Line A during peak periods.

The station is built on the bridge over the Nieuwe Damlaan, one of the principal streets northwest of the city centre of Schiedam.

== History ==
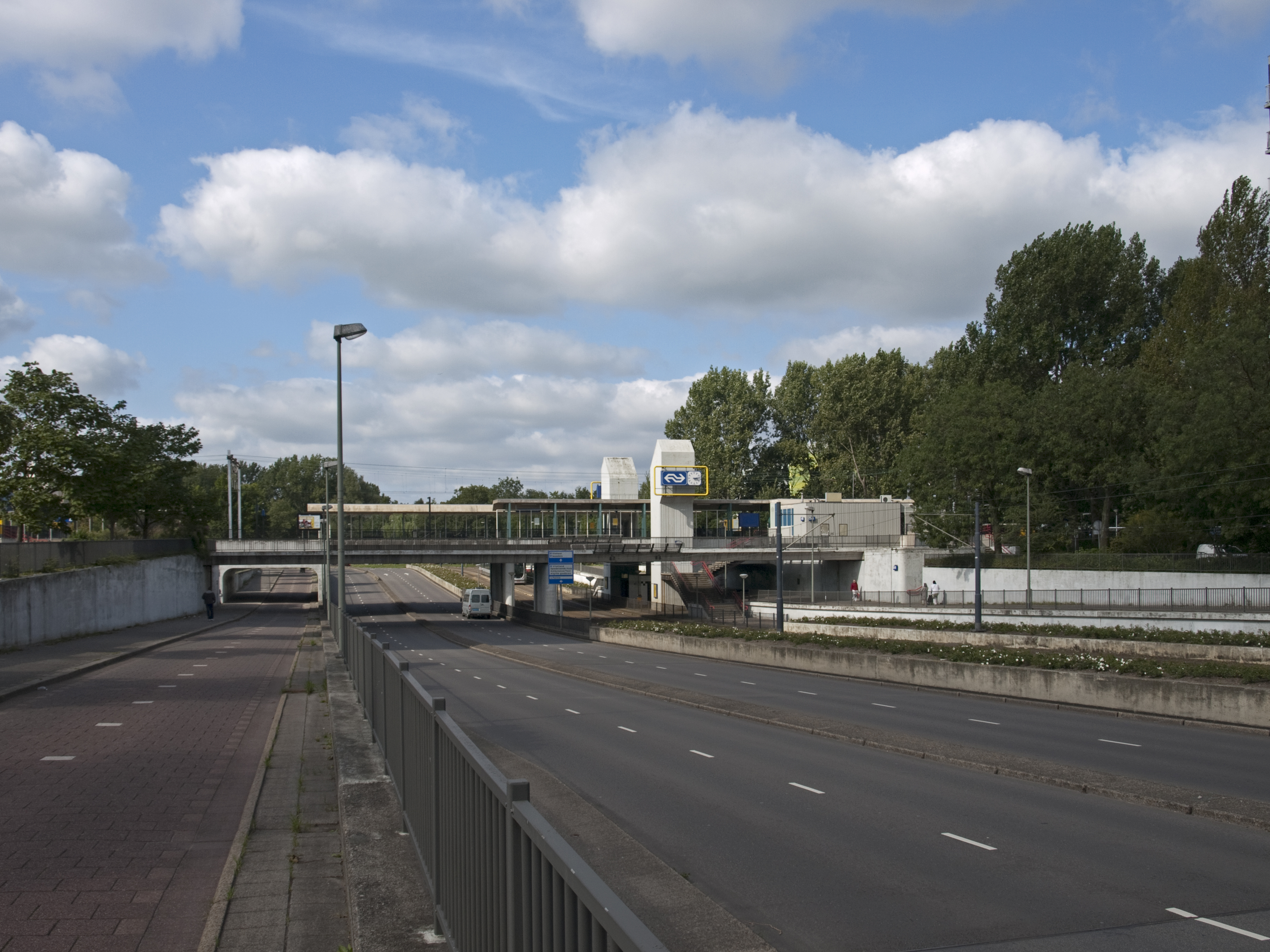
Railway station in 2012

The station was opened on 1 June 1975 as a railway station and was operated by Nederlandse Spoorwegen until 31 March 2017. The station and other infrastructure was then handed over to the Rotterdamse Elektrische Tram (RET) and closed for a 2-year period of renovation and adapting to their metro mode of transportation. The station reopened on 30 September 2019 as part of the Rotterdam Metro.

== Services ==
As of 2019, Schiedam Nieuwland is served by 6 trains per hour on RET Metro Line B, of which 3 per hour travel the full length of the route, and 3 travel only as far as Steendijkpolder

During peak periods, the station is also served by 6 trains per hour on Line a, which travel as far as Vlaardingen West.
