= Vlaardingen Centrum metro station =

Metro station in Vlaardingen, the Netherlands

Vlaardingen Centrum
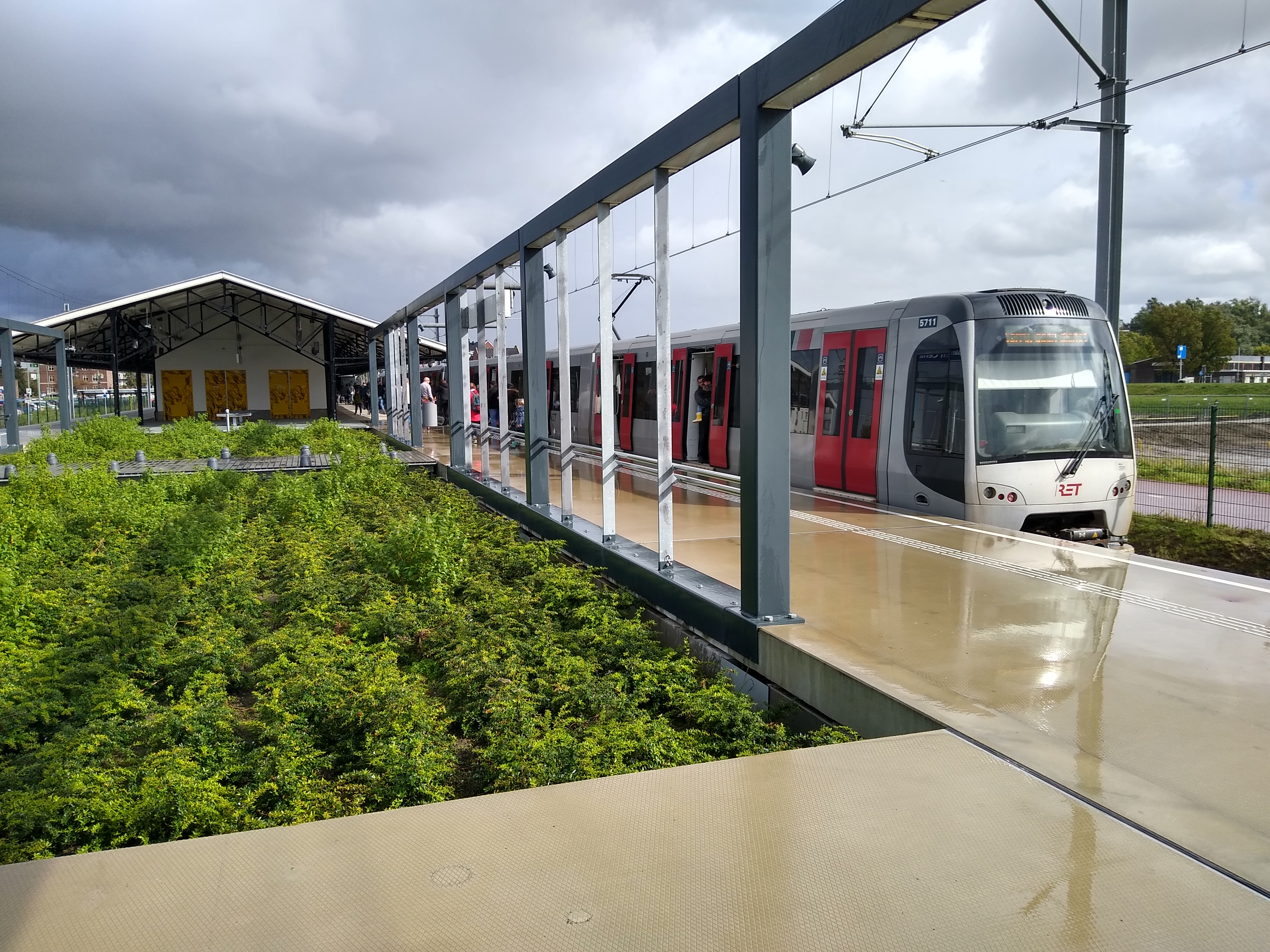

General information
- Location: Netherlands
- Coordinates: 51°54′11″N 4°20′40″E
- System: Rotterdam Metro station
- Line: Schiedam–Hoek van Holland railway
- Platforms: 1 island platform
- Tracks: 2

History
- Opened: 17 August 1891
- Closed: 1 April 2017
- Rebuilt: 30 September 2019

Services
Preceding station	Rotterdam Metro	Following station
Vlaardingen West Terminus	Line A Only during peak periods	Vlaardingen Oost towards Binnenhof
Vlaardingen West towards Hoek van Holland Strand	Line B	Vlaardingen Oost towards Nesselande
Location
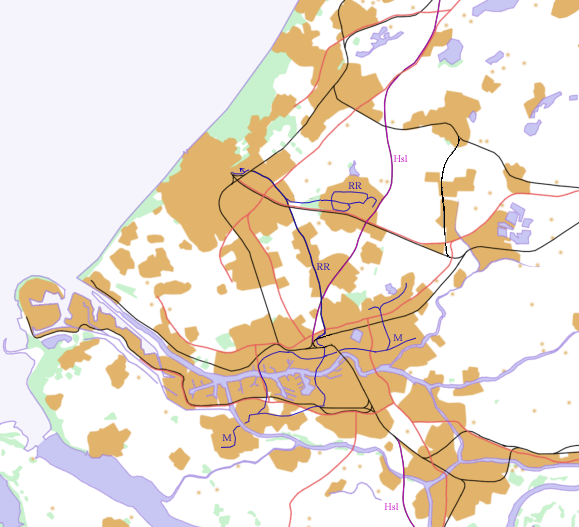
- Location within Southwest Randstad Location within Netherlands

Vlaardingen Centrum is a metro station in Vlaardingen in the Netherlands. The station is located on the Schiedam–Hoek van Holland railway.

== History ==
Vlaardingen Centrum was first opened as a train station on 17 August 1891.

The Nederlandse Spoorwegen stopped operating the line, including Vlaardingen Centrum railway station, on 1 April 2017 to enable conversion for metro train operations. The station was reopened by RET on 30 September 2019, with preview services operating on 28 September. The station had a yard connected that was used during the early days of the Schiedam-Hoek van Holland railway (Hoekse Lijn). Later the yard got abandoned and removed during the train-metro transition.

== Metro services ==
As of 2019, Vlaardingen Centrum is served by 6 trains per hour on RET Metro Line B, of which 3 per hour travel the full length of the route, and 3 travel only as far as Steendijkpolder

During peak periods, the station is also served by Line A, with 6 trains per hour travelling as far as Vlaardingen West.

== Bus services ==
Bus services are operated by RET.

Buslines with stops on Vlaardingen West
Line	Route	Via	Details
526	Vlaardingen Centrum - Vlaardingen Centrum (ring)	Liesveldviaduct	STOPandGO line
