= Schiedam Centrum station =

Metro and railway station in Schiedam, Netherlands

Schiedam Centrum
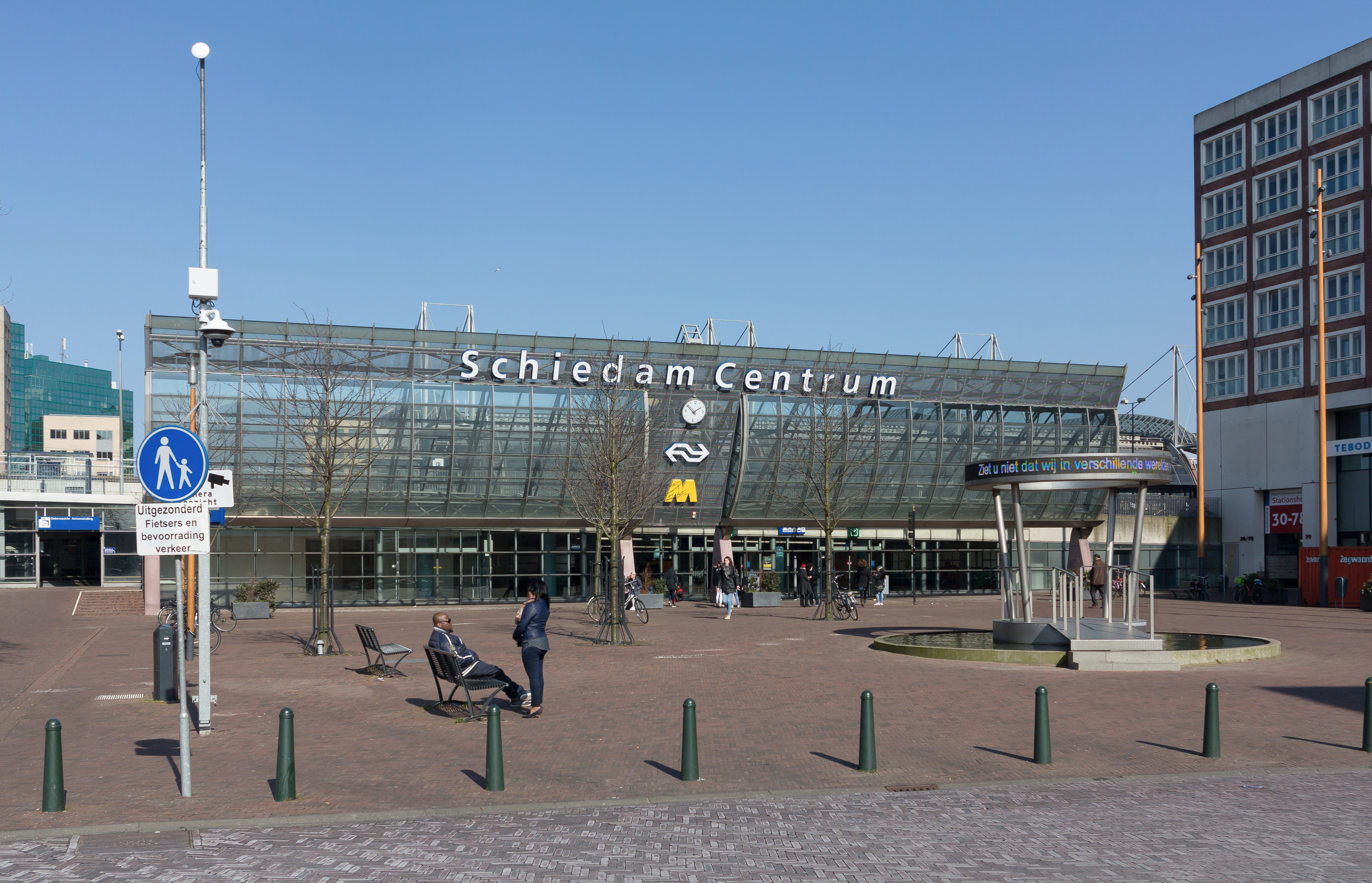

General information
- Location: Netherlands
- Coordinates: 51°55′19″N 4°24′36″E
- Lines: Amsterdam–Rotterdam railway Schiedam–Hoek van Holland railway
- Platforms: 4
- Connections: RET Rotterdam Metro: A, B, C RET Rotterdam Tram: 1, 11; RET: 38, 51, 53, 54, 126, 226, B2, B3, B9; EBS: 456, 824, 826

Other information
- Station code: Sdm

History
- Opened: 1847; 179 years ago

Services
Preceding station	Nederlandse Spoorwegen	Following station
Delft towards Amsterdam Centraal	NS Intercity 2200	Rotterdam Centraal towards Vlissingen
Delft towards Amsterdam Centraal	NS Intercity 2300 Mon-Fri until 20:00	Rotterdam Centraal towards Vlissingen
Delft towards Venlo	NS Intercity 3500	Rotterdam Centraal towards Dordrecht
Delft Campus towards Den Haag Centraal	NS Sprinter 5000 Mon-Fri until 20:00	Rotterdam Centraal towards Dordrecht
Delft Campus towards Den Haag Centraal	NS Sprinter 5100	Rotterdam Centraal towards Dordrecht
Delft Campus towards Den Haag Centraal	NS Sprinter 5200 Mon-Thu until 19:00	Rotterdam Centraal towards Dordrecht
Preceding station	Rotterdam Metro	Following station
Schiedam Nieuwland towards Vlaardingen West	Line A	Marconiplein towards Binnenhof
Schiedam Nieuwland towards Hoek van Holland Strand	Line B	Marconiplein towards Nesselande
Parkweg towards De Akkers	Line C	Marconiplein towards De Terp
Location
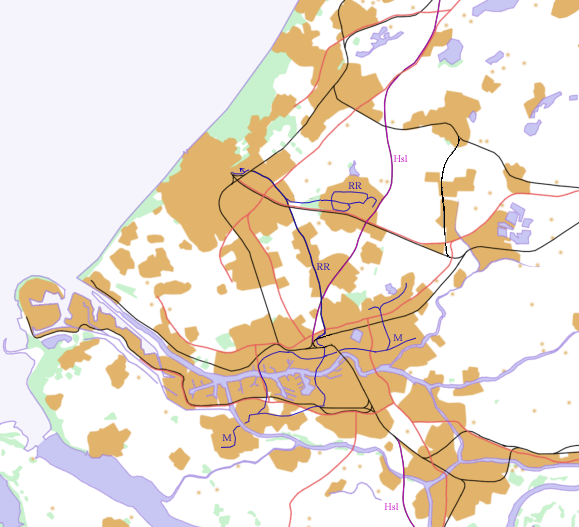
- Location within Southwest Randstad Location within Netherlands

Schiedam Centrum is a railway station and metro station in Schiedam, just to the west of Rotterdam, Netherlands, on the railway line between The Hague and Rotterdam Centraal. Train services are operated by Nederlandse Spoorwegen, and metro, tram and bus services are operated by Rotterdamse Elektrische Tram.

== History ==
The station opened on 3 June 1847 as Schiedam, with The Hague – Rotterdam railway line. The branch to Maassluis opened in 1891, extended to Hook of Holland (Hoek van Holland) two years later. In 1967 the station was renamed Schiedam-Rotterdam West, and in 1998 it was renamed again to Schiedam Centrum.

In 2000, the railway building was completely renewed as part of the extension of the East-West Line of the Rotterdam Metro, which has called at Schiedam Centrum since November 2002.

In 2017, railway services to Hook of Holland ceased as the line would be converted for metro operations. Service to Hook of Holland resumed on 30 September 2019, now operated by RET Metro Line B.

=== Incidents ===
In 1856 the first major train accident in the Netherlands occurred near Schiedam causing three deaths.

In 1976 there was a major train disaster near the station, resulting in 24 deaths.

== Services ==
=== Train services ===
The following services call at Schiedam Centrum:

- 2× per hour intercity Amsterdam – Haarlem – Leiden – The Hague – Rotterdam – Dordrecht – Roosendaal – Vlissingen
- 2× per hour intercity Venlo – Eindhoven - ‘s-Hertogenbosch – Utrecht – Amsterdam – Schiphol – Leiden – The Hague – Rotterdam – Dordrecht
- 6× per hour local service (sprinter) The Hague – Rotterdam – Dordrecht

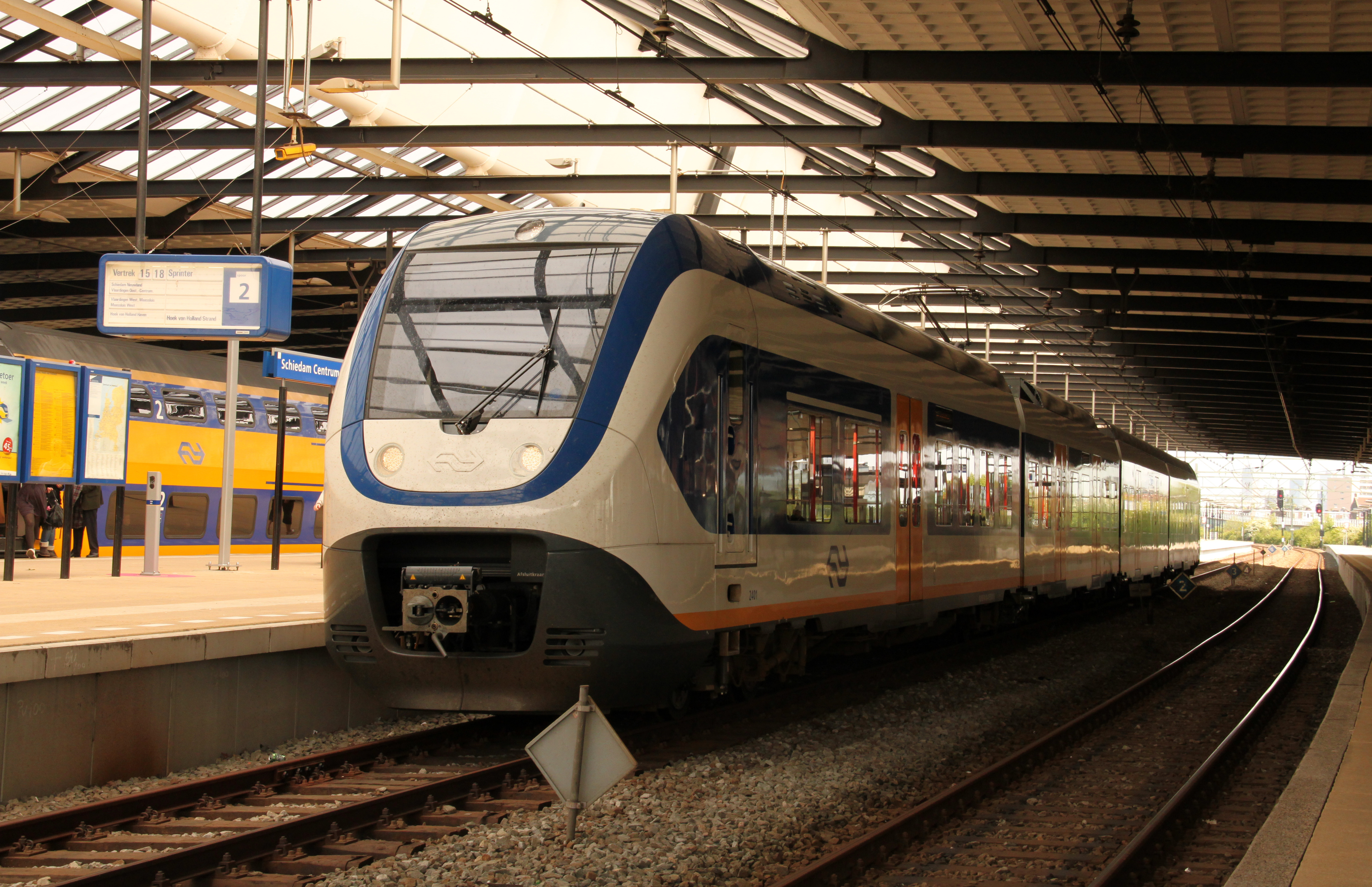
New (2010) SLT unit 2401 on a Hook of Holland service at Schiedam Centrum

=== Metro services ===
Schiedam Centrum is an important station on Rotterdam Metro lines A, B, and C. Just west of the station is the junction where Lines A and B diverge from Line C to head toward Hoek van Holland Haven metro station. It is also an important station for transfers from metro and tram to train. Outside of peak periods, it is also the western terminus of Line A.

=== Tram and bus services ===
Several Rotterdam tram and bus lines call at Schiedam Centrum. A tram stop for RET lines 1 and 11 is near the entrances of the railway and the metro station.

Preceding station	Line	Following station
's-Gravelandseweg	Tram 1 Holy – De Esch	Broersvest
's-Gravelandseweg	Tram 11; Woudhoek– De Esch	Broersvest
