= Maassluis Centrum metro station =

Metro station in Maassluis, the Netherlands

Maassluis Centrum
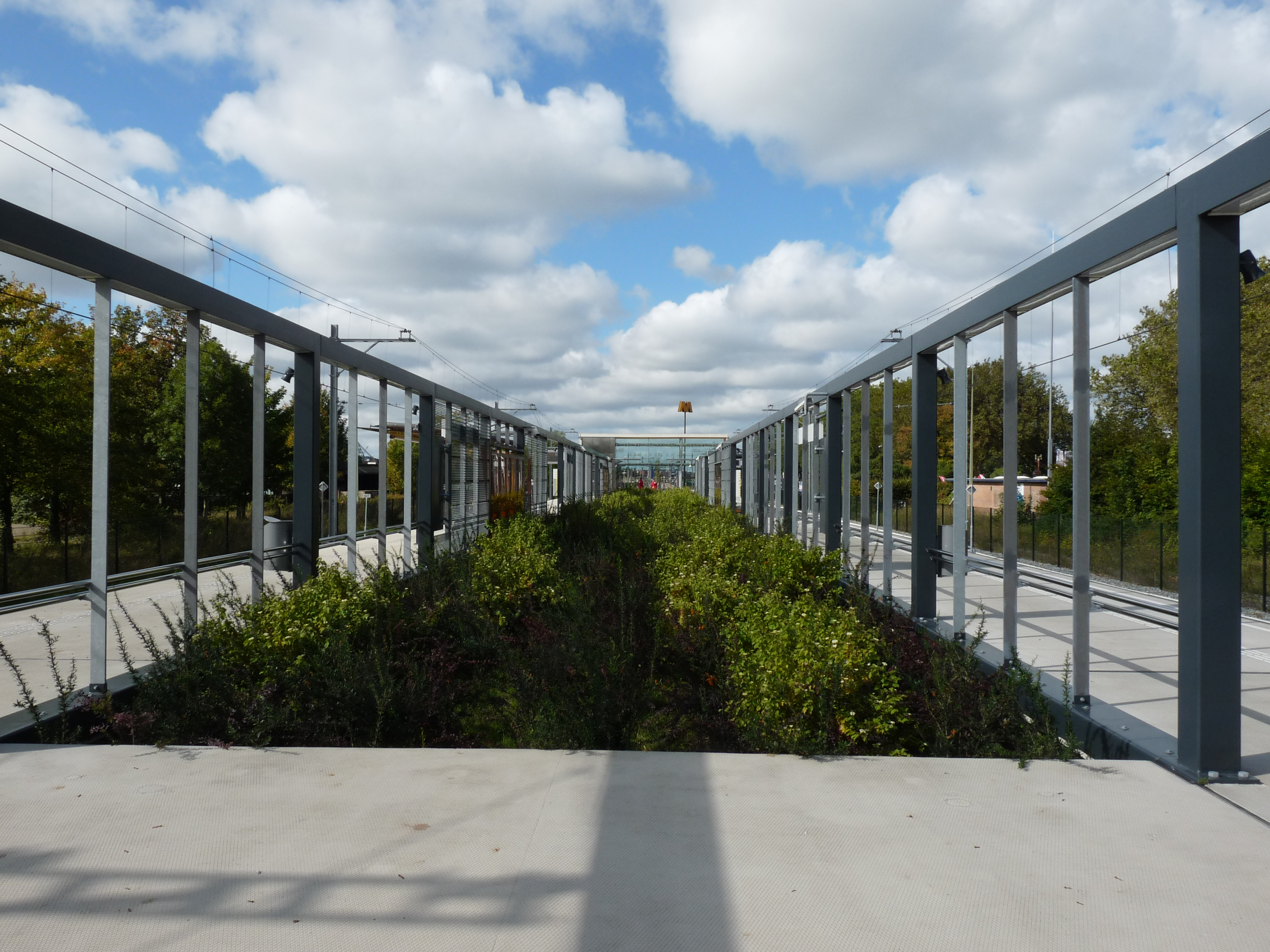

General information
- Location: Netherlands
- Coordinates: 51°55′5″N 4°15′13″E
- System: Rotterdam Metro station
- Platforms: 1 island platform
- Tracks: 2

Other information
- Station code: Mss

History
- Opened: 1891
- Closed: 1 April 2017
- Rebuilt: 30 September 2019

Services
Preceding station	Rotterdam Metro	Following station
Maassluis West towards Hoek van Holland Strand	Line B	Vlaardingen West towards Nesselande
Location
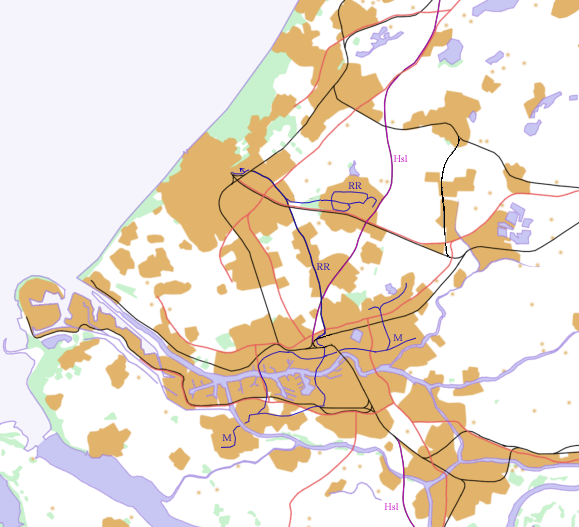
- Location within Southwest Randstad Location within Netherlands

Maassluis Centrum, formerly Maassluis, is a metro station in Maassluis, The Netherlands.

== History ==
Maassluis station was opened on 17 August 1891 by the Hollandsche IJzeren Spoorweg-Maatschappij as part of the opening of the Schiedam–Hoek van Holland railway, also known as the Hoekse Lijn. The HSM was subsequently merged into Nederlandse Spoorwegen in 1938.

The station building was replaced by the current building in 1980.

NS stopped operating the line, including Maassluis railway station, on 1 April 2017 to enable conversion for metro train operations. The station was reopened by RET on 30 September 2019, with preview services operating on 28 September.

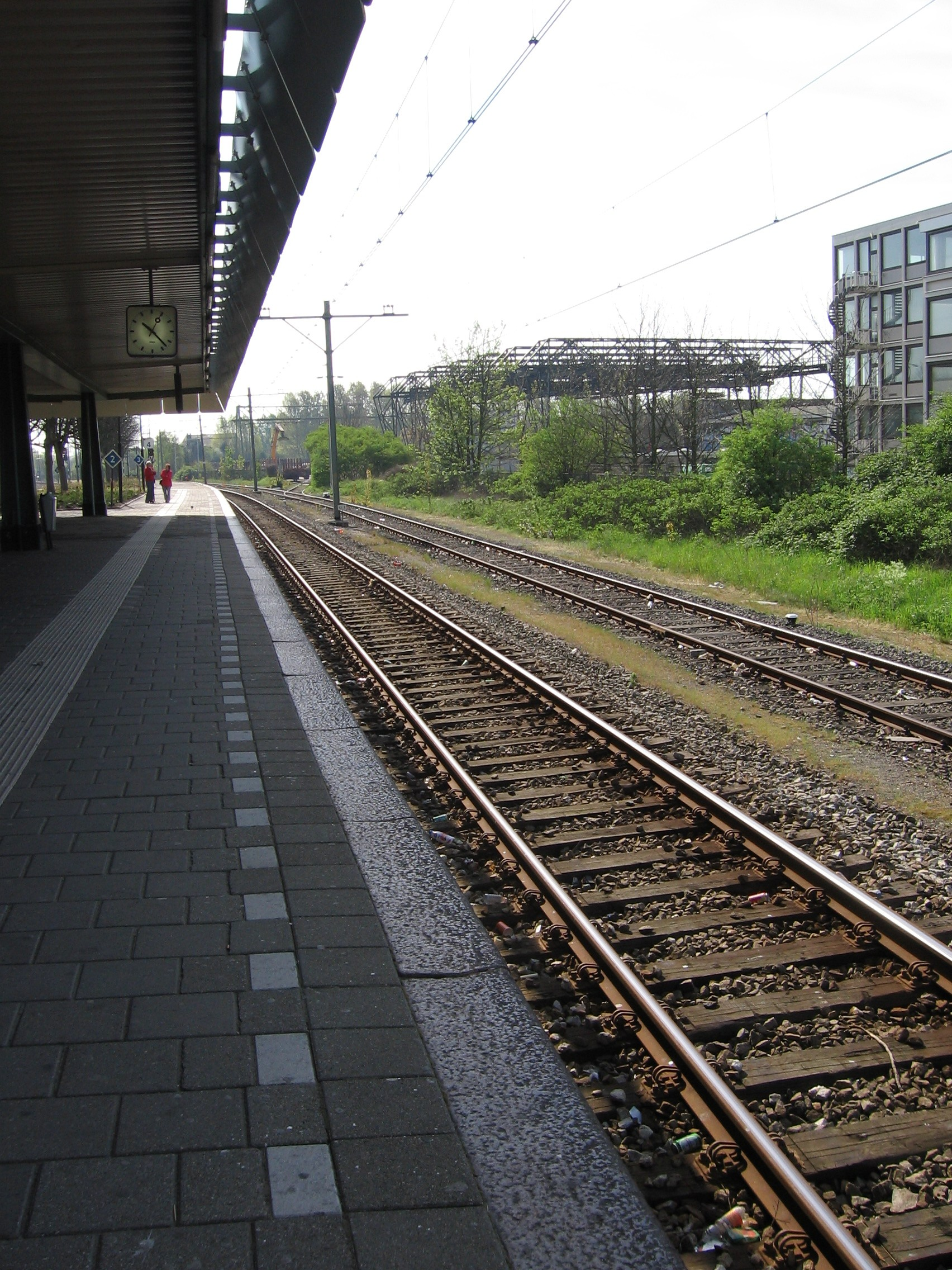
Platform 1

== Services ==
As of 2019, Maassluis Centrum is served by 6 trains per hour on RET Metro Line B, of which 3 per hour travel the full length of the route, and 3 travel only as far as Steendijkpolder
