= Vlaardingen West metro station =

Metro station in Vlaardingen, the Netherlands

Vlaardingen West
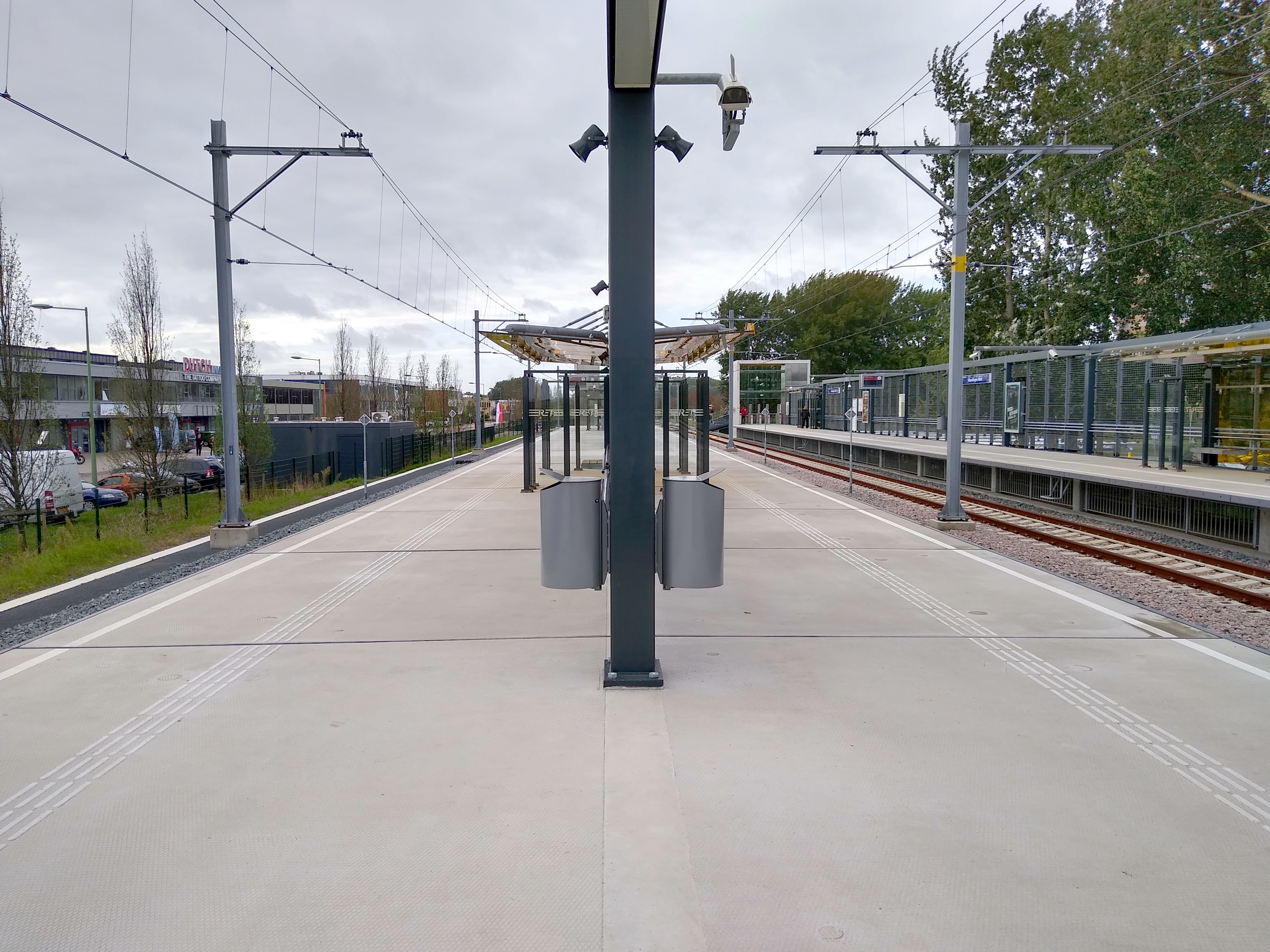

General information
- Location: Netherlands
- Coordinates: 51°54′14″N 4°18′51″E
- System: Rotterdam Metro station
- Line: Schiedam–Hoek van Holland railway
- Platforms: 1 island platform 1 side platform
- Tracks: 3

History
- Opened: 1 June 1969
- Closed: 1 April 2017
- Rebuilt: 30 September 2019

Services
Preceding station	Rotterdam Metro	Following station
From January 2019
Terminus	Line A Not on evenings and early weekend mornings	Vlaardingen Centrum towards Binnenhof
Maassluis Centrum towards Hoek van Holland Strand	Line B	Vlaardingen Centrum towards Nesselande
Location
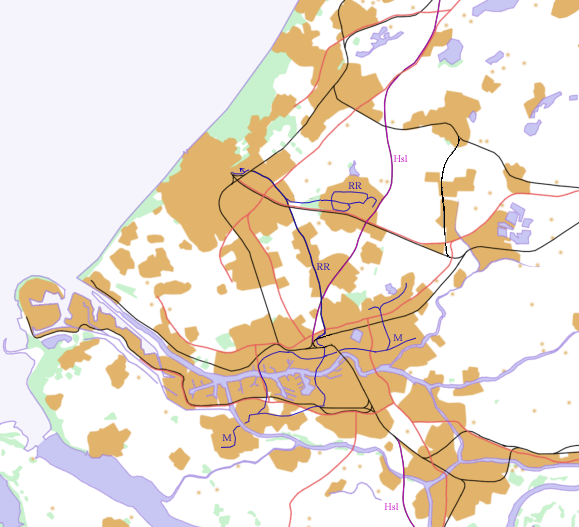
- Location within Southwest Randstad Location within Netherlands

Vlaardingen West is a metro station in Vlaardingen, the Netherlands. Located on the Hoekse Lijn, it is served by RET Metro Line B at all times, and Line A during peak periods.

== History ==
The station was opened on 1 June 1969 by Nederlandse Spoorwegen, as a local railway station on the Hoekse Lijn. NS stopped operating the line, including Vlaardingen West railway station, on 1 April 2017 to enable conversion for metro train operations. The station was reopened by RET on 30 September 2019, with preview services operating on 28 September.

== Metro services ==
As of 2019, Vlaardingen West is served by 6 trains per hour on RET Metro Line B, of which 3 per hour travel the full length of the route, and 3 travel only as far as Steendijkpolder

During peak periods, the station is also the western terminus of Line A, with 6 trains per hour making use of the centre track and platform to turn back eastbound.

== Bus services ==
Bus services are operated by RET.

Bus services stopping at Vlaardingen West
Line	Route	Via	Details
56	Vlaardingen West - Holy-Noord	Vlaardingen Oost, Overdrevenpad	
156	Vlaardingen West - Holy-Noord	Vlaardingen Oost, Jean Monnetring	Not on Sundays
B2	Rotterdam Centraal - Rotterdam Centraal (ring)	Vijfsluizen, Vlaardingen Oost, Vlaardingen West	Friday- and Saturday evenings only

- 56 Vlaardingen West - Holy Noord
