= Schiedam–Hoek van Holland railway =

The Schiedam–Hoek van Holland railway (also called the Hoekse Lijn) is a former railway line and current rapid transit line of the Rotterdam Metro between Schiedam and Hook of Holland (Hoek van Holland) along the Nieuwe Maas, in the west of the Netherlands. The line is also an important freight railway, it is 24 kilometres (15 miles) long.

== History ==
On 17 August 1891, the first section between Schiedam Centrum and Maassluis was opened as a heavy-rail line. The section between Maassluis and Hoek van Holland Strand followed on 1 June 1893. In 1935, the entire route was electrified.

The Stena Line provides a ferry service to Harwich International Port in Harwich, England, from the Hoek van Holland Haven station. Formerly, other international train services used the line, as far as Moscow or Berlin; travellers can easily change at Hook of Holland to the ferry. Since the opening of the Channel Tunnel in 1994, the importance of this line has decreased sharply.

On 31 March 2017, the final passenger trains of the Nederlandse Spoorwegen ran on the line. The line reopened in 2019 as part of the Rotterdam Metro. The overhead electrification system has been converted to 750 V DC and the railway stations to metro standards. Also, in Maassluis, a new station, Steendijkpolder, is built, but plans for additional intermediate stations in Schiedam and Hoek van Holland have not been specified. The Hoek van Holland Strand station will also be moved closer to the beach, as the name suggests.

== Services ==
Until 2017, there were five Sprinter trains per hour from Rotterdam Centraal station to Maassluis West and half-hourly services to Hoek van Holland Haven. In the peak season, all trains usually terminating at Maassluis West were extended to Hoek van Holland Haven, and the service between Rotterdam Centraal and Vlaardingen Centrum was increased to every 7.5 minutes. Service to Hoek van Holland Strand was only provided every hour during the summer months.

Between April 2017 and February 2018, four rail-replacement bus lines (711, 712, 156 and 713) ran alongside the regular bus lines (56, 57 and 126). These services were being operated by RET.

Rail-replacement services were originally scheduled to run only until September 2017; however, unforeseen events caused a delay in re-opening the track until October 2019. These include more soil contamination and asbestos than anticipated as well as finding cables which had not been documented during preliminary investigations and which had to be removed or, for the ones which were still active, moved.

Metro line B from Nesselande runs with 10-minute intervals from Schiedam to Hoek van Holland Haven, half of which will terminate at Maassluis Steendijkpolder. Furthermore, metro line A provides a service from Binnenhof to Vlaardingen West during peak hours. The line will remain open to freight trains, retaining a connection to the national rail network at Schiedam.

The line was reopened on 30 September 2019 for a test period of four weeks. On 1 November 2019 it was officially reopened.

== Stations ==
- Schiedam Centrum
- Schiedam Nieuwland
- Vlaardingen Oost
- Vlaardingen Centrum
- Vlaardingen West
- Maassluis
- Maassluis West
- Steendijkpolder
- Hoek van Holland Haven
- Hoek van Holland Strand (The original station is not included on the metro line and was reopened as the metro terminus at the beach in 2022.)

== Gallery ==
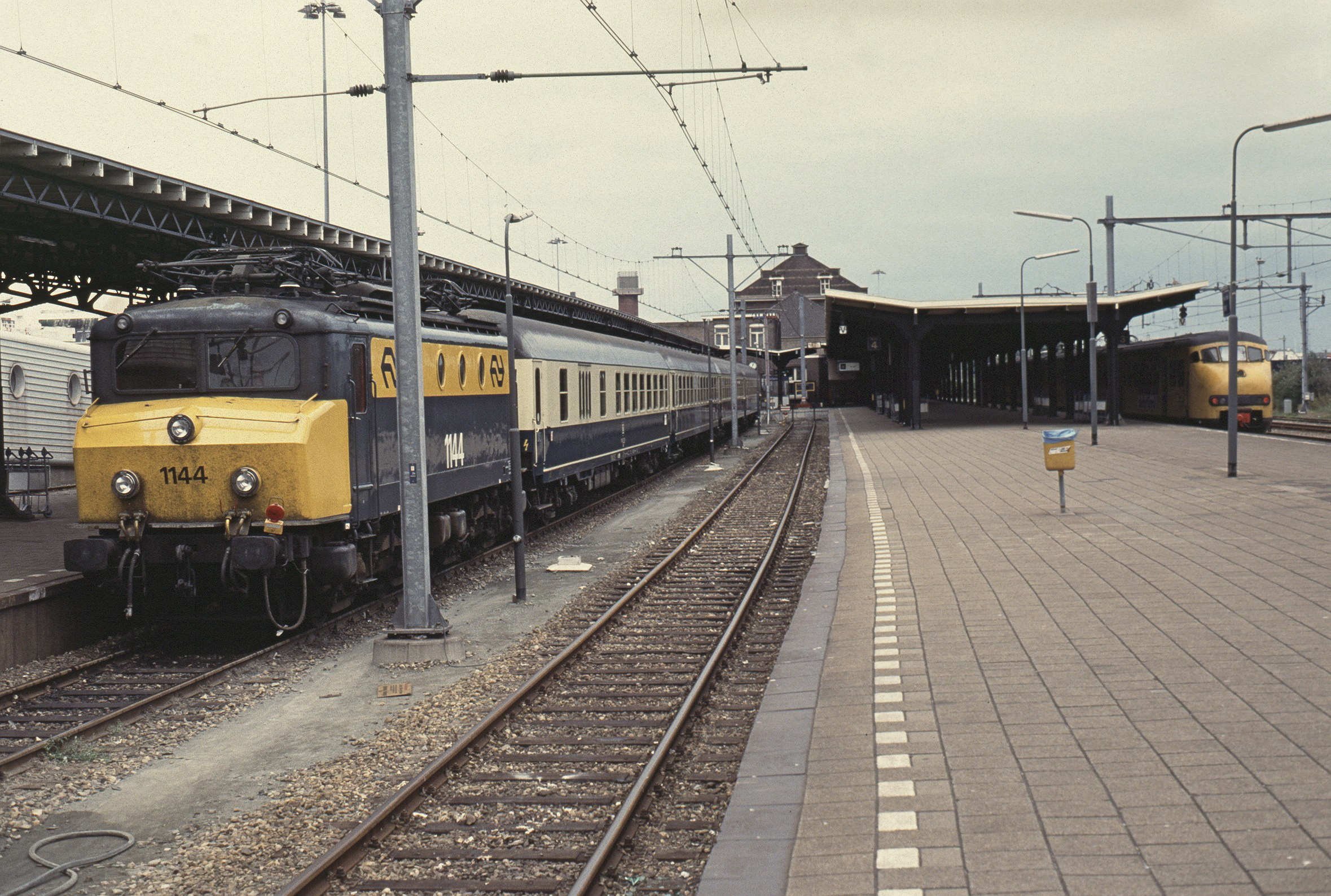
The train bay platforms at Hoek van Holland Haven, 1991. Currently replaced by additional metro platforms.

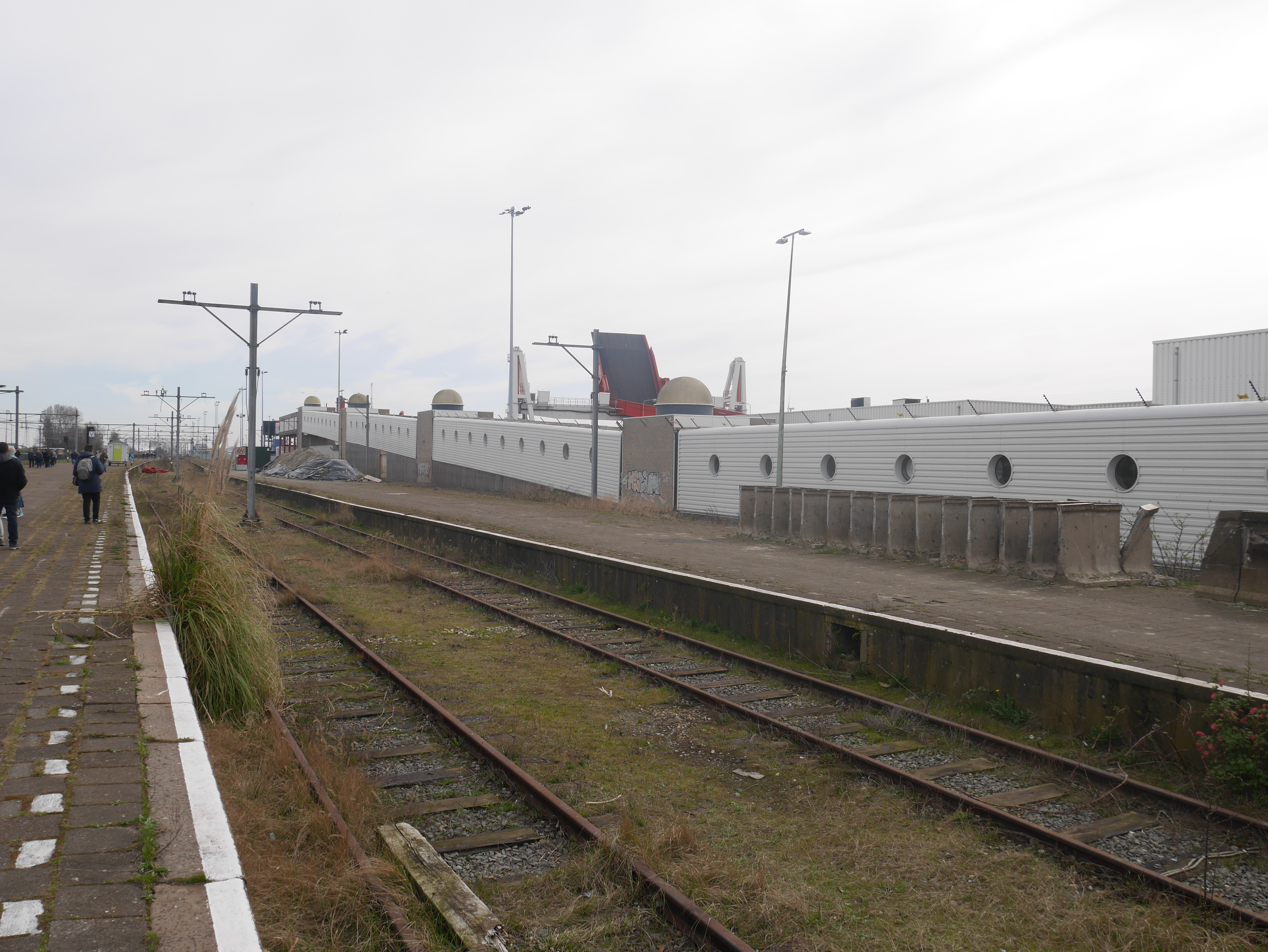
The train bay platforms at Hoek van Holland Haven, 2017. Currently replaced by additional metro platforms.

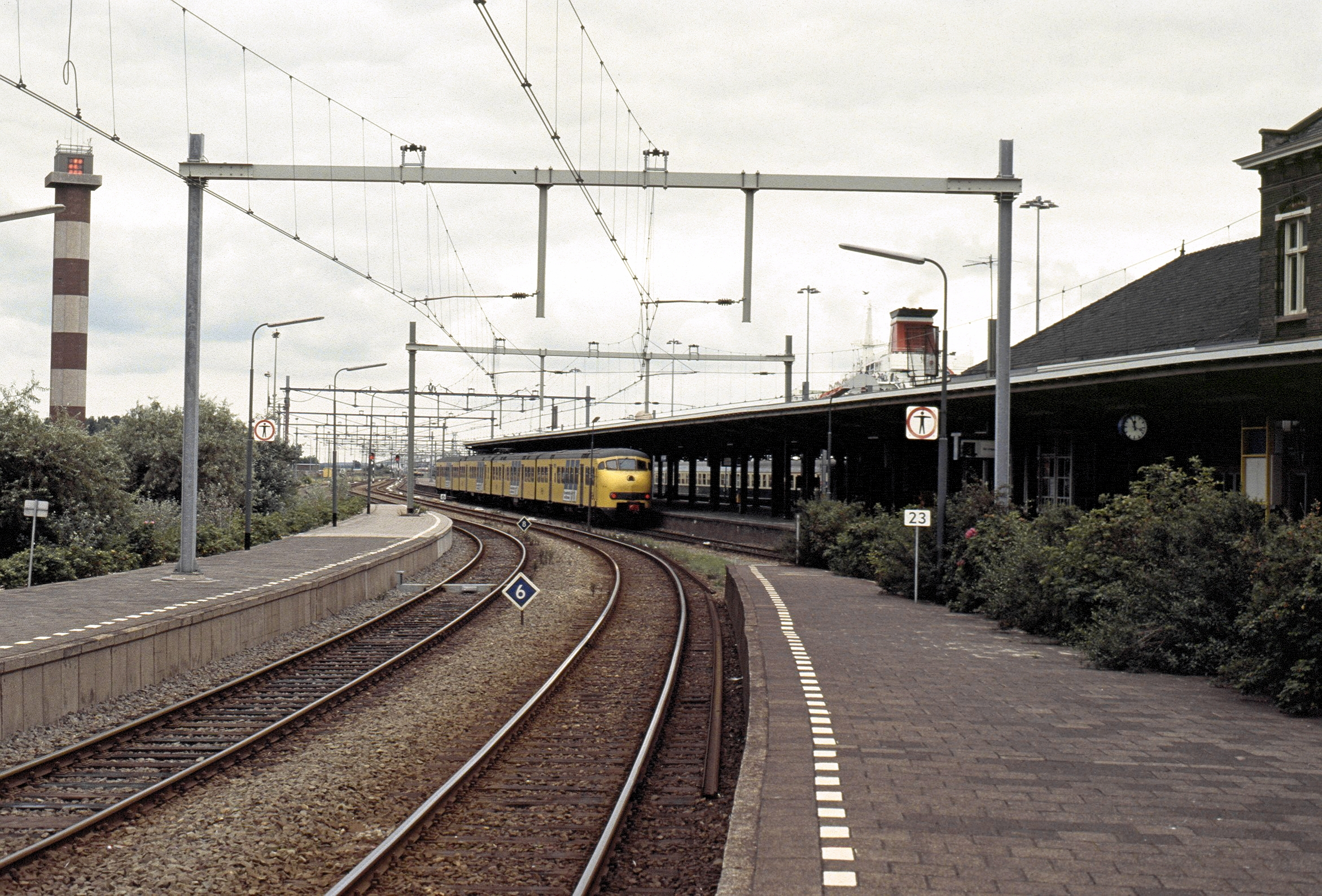
Hoek van Holland Haven, showing the platforms for trains to/from Hoek van Holland Strand. The platforms are removed since the transition to metro.

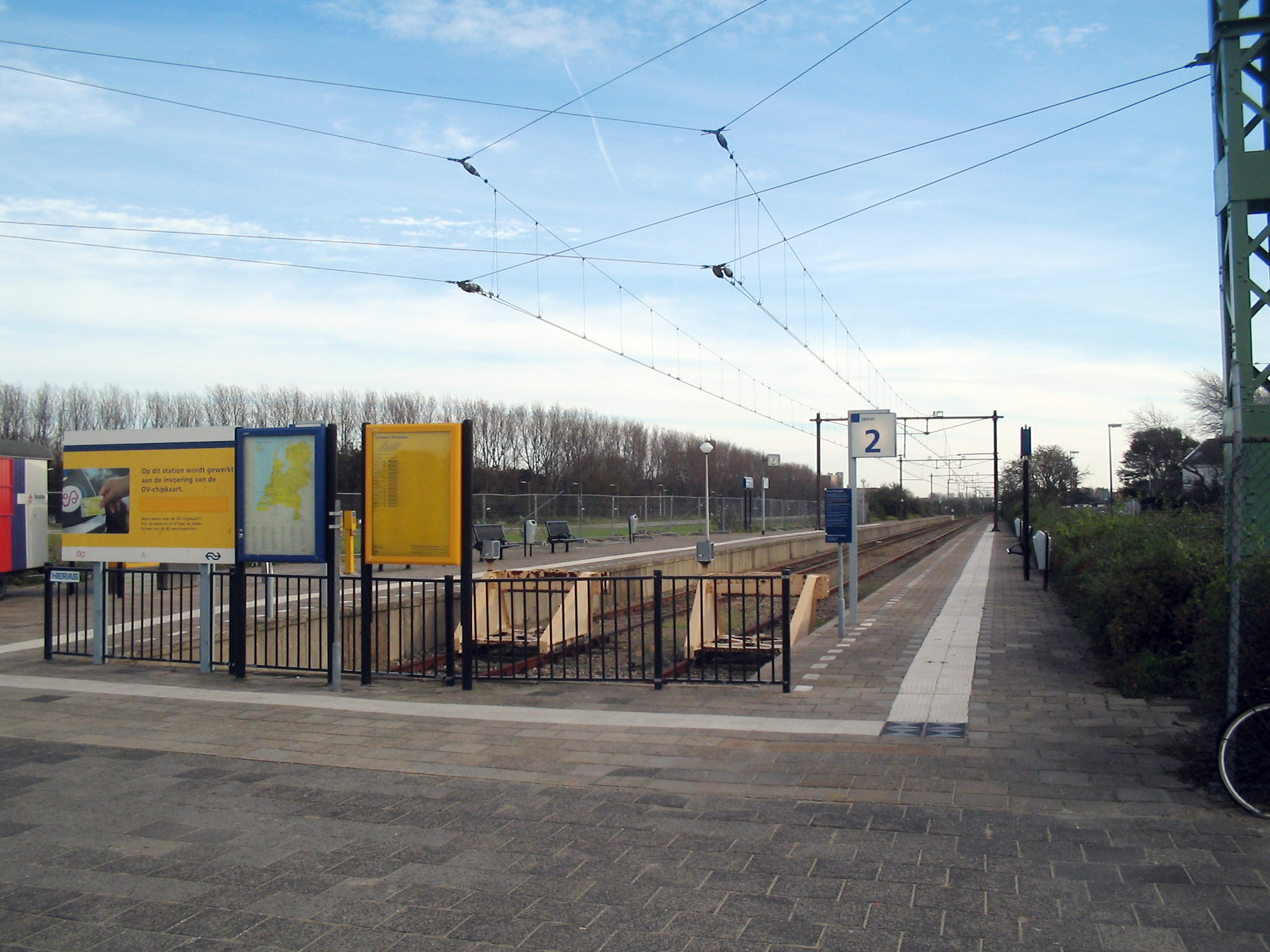
Terminus at Hoek van Holland Strand. Currently the station is inaccessible and the platforms and tracks are removed.

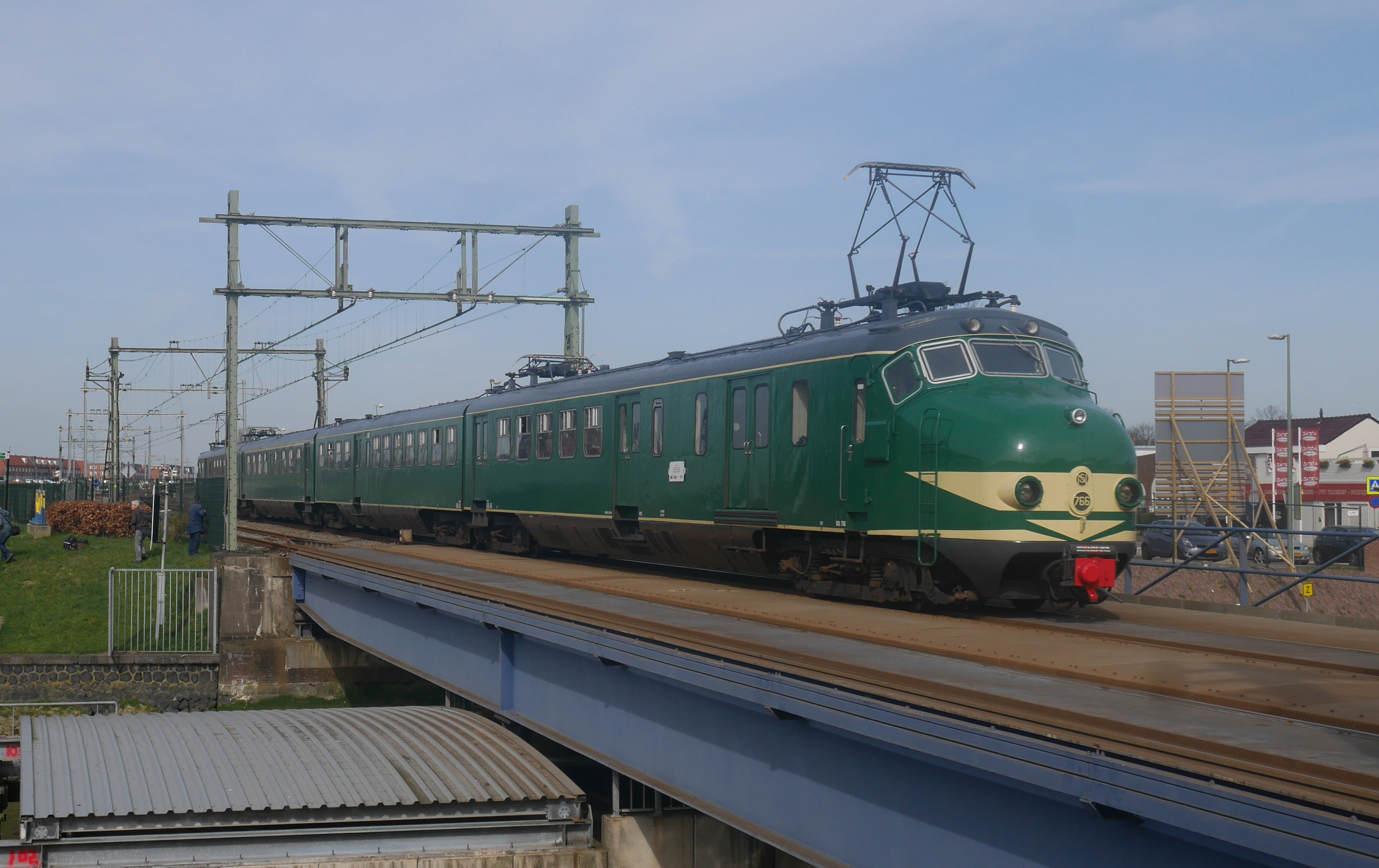
Two bridges along the Hoekse Lijn have no overhead power wires, as here at the turning bridge in Maassluis as a "Hondekop" train passes by. The overhead wires added after the transition to metro.
