= HLDS =

HLDS may refer to:

- Half-Life Dedicated Server, a server for multiplayer games using the GoldSrc engine.
- Hitachi-LG Data Storage, a joint venture between Hitachi and the LG group
- Hoek van Holland Strand railway station, in the Netherlands
