= Maassluis West metro station =

Metro station in Maassluis, the Netherlands

Maassluis West
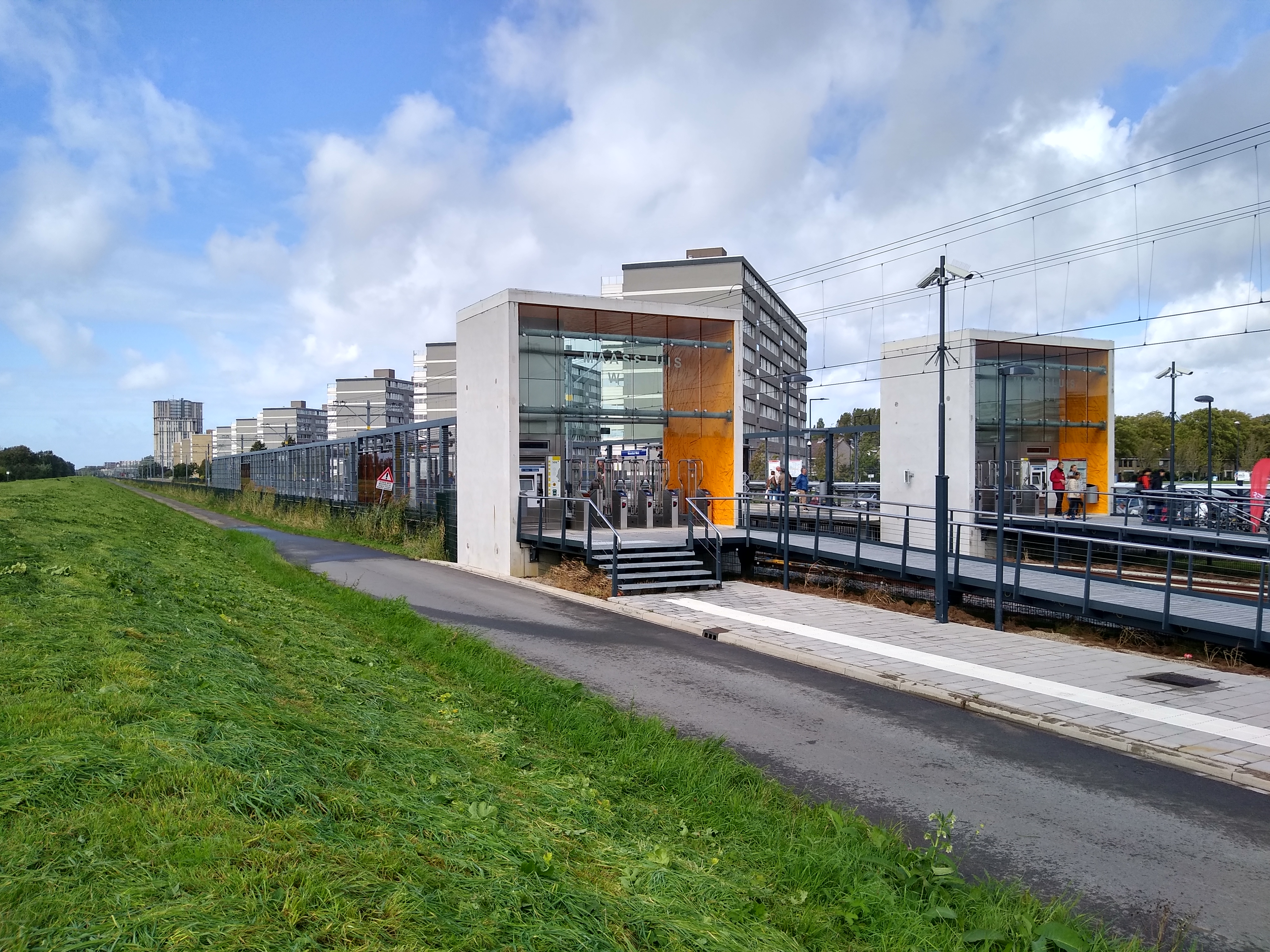

General information
- Location: Netherlands
- Coordinates: 51°55′32″N 4°14′10″E
- System: Rotterdam Metro station
- Owner: RET
- Platforms: 2 Side Platforms

Other information
- Station code: Msw

History
- Opened: 31 May 1970
- Closed: 1 April 2017
- Rebuilt: 30 September 2019

Services
Preceding station	Rotterdam Metro	Following station
Maassluis Steendijkpolder towards Hoek van Holland Strand	Line B	Maassluis Centrum towards Nesselande
Location
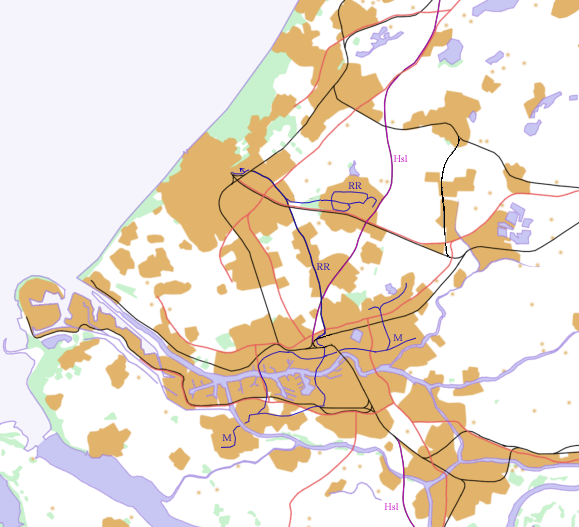
- Location within Southwest Randstad Location within Netherlands

Maassluis West is a metro station in Maassluis, Netherlands. Originally opened as a railway station, it is now part of Rotterdam Metro Line B.

== History ==
Maassluis West station opened on 31 May 1970 as a railway station on the Hoekse Lijn operated by Nederlandse Spoorwegen (NS).

NS stopped operating the line, including Maassluis West railway station, on 1 April 2017 to enable conversion for metro train operations. The station was reopened by RET on 30 September 2019, with preview services operating on 28 September.

== Services ==
As of 2019, Maassluis West is served by 6 trains per hour on RET Metro Line B, of which 3 per hour travel the full length of the route, and 3 travel only as far as Steendijkpolder
