= Hoek van Holland Haven metro station =

Rapid transit facility in the Netherlands

Hoek van Holland Haven
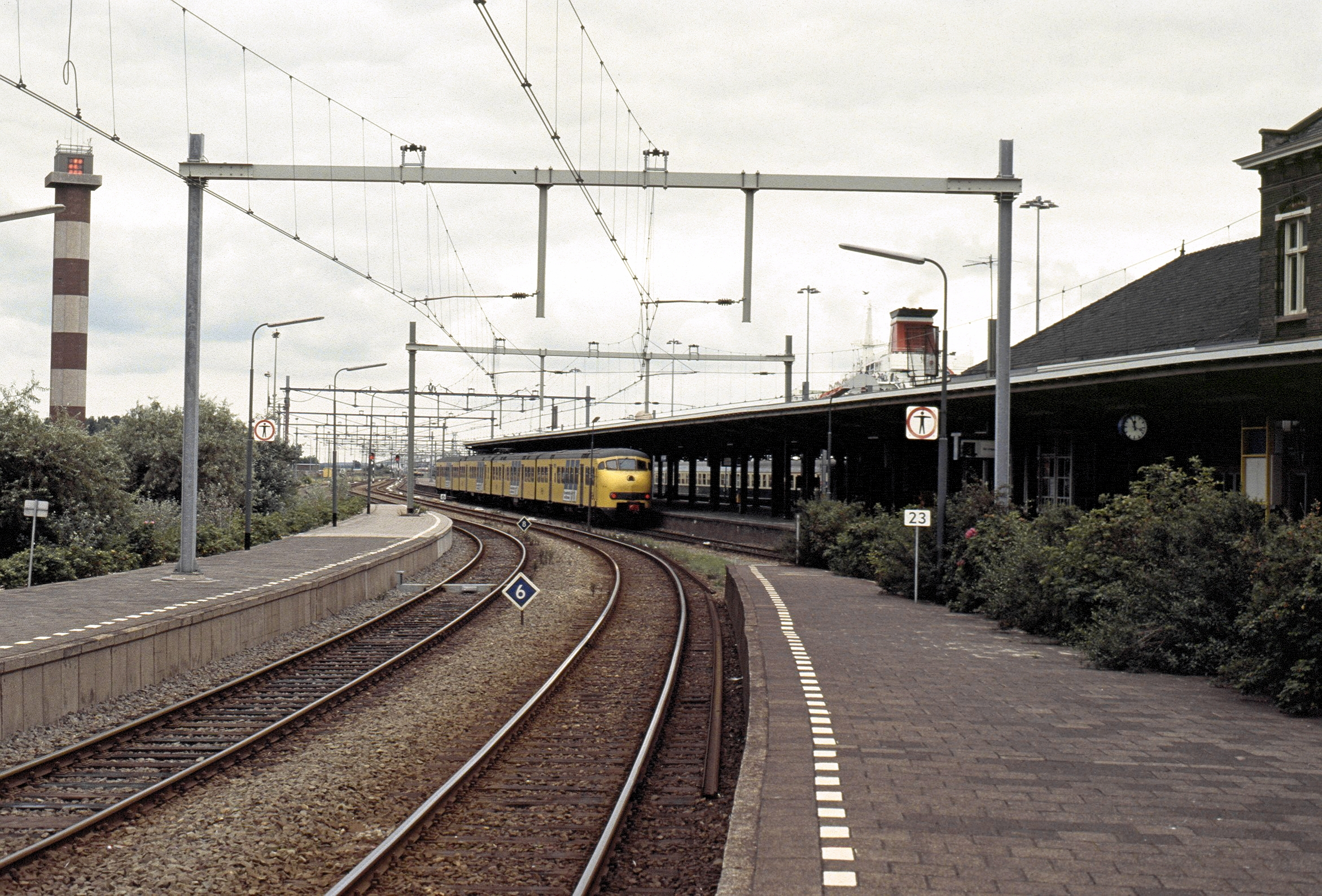
- Original location of the station platform (1991)

General information
- Location: Netherlands
- Coordinates: 51°58′41″N 4°7′42″E
- System: Rotterdam Metro station
- Operator: RET
- Platforms: 1 staggered side platform
- Tracks: 2

Construction
- Architect: M.A. van Wadenoijen

Other information
- Station code: Hld

History
- Opened: 1 June 1893
- Closed: 1 April 2017
- Rebuilt: 30 September 2019
- Electrified: 1935

Services
Preceding station	Rotterdam Metro	Following station
Hoek van Holland Strand Terminus	Line B	Maassluis Steendijkpolder towards Nesselande
Location
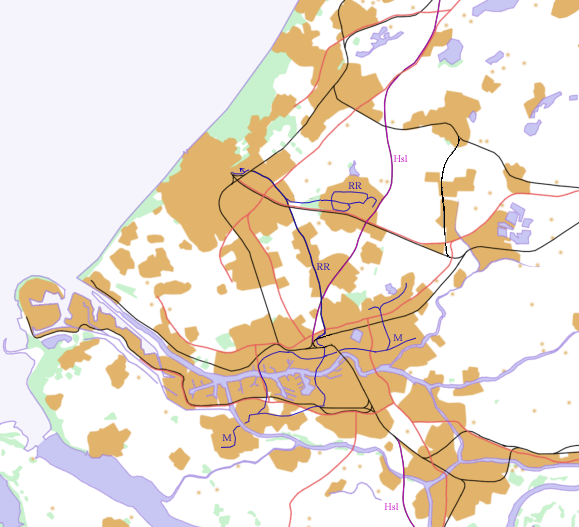
- Location within Southwest Randstad Location within Netherlands

Hoek van Holland Haven (Hook of Holland Harbour) is a metro station on Line B of the Rotterdam Metro, in Hook of Holland (Hoek van Holland), Rotterdam, South Holland. Trains connect with the Stena Line Dutchflyer boat service to Harwich International in England. Until 1 April 2017, it was a railway station served by Nederlandse Spoorwegen. On 30 September 2019, it reopened as the western terminus of RET Metro Line B., and in 2023 it was extended to the new Hoek van Holland Strand station with the platforms relocated to the northwest of the historical station-building, so that they are on the new section of the line.

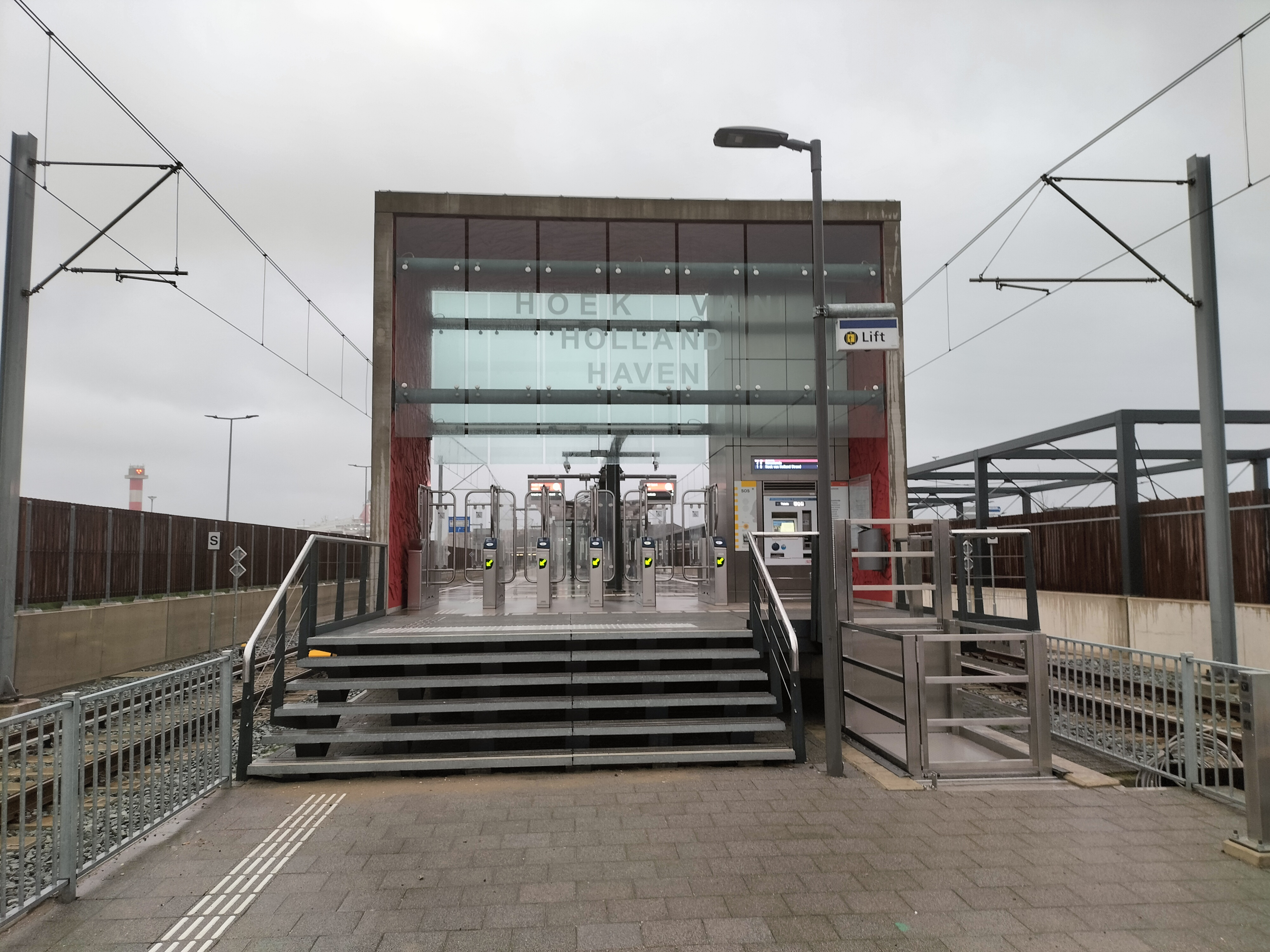
Platform on the new section of the line B (2021).

== Train services ==
As of 2019, metro service operates every 20 minutes throughout the day to Nesselande, via Beurs.

Since 2017 rail service from Rotterdam Centraal railway station operates every 30 minutes. The service continues on to Hoek van Holland Strand railway station 600 m (2,000 ft) further west.

== Ferry services ==
Previous	Line	Next
Harwich International via Stena Line	Dutchflyer; London-Amsterdam	Rotterdam Centraal via the Rotterdam Metro Line B
Harwich International	Stena Line; Ferry	Terminus
