= Hoek van Holland Strand railway station =

Former railway station in the Netherlands

Hoek van Holland Strand
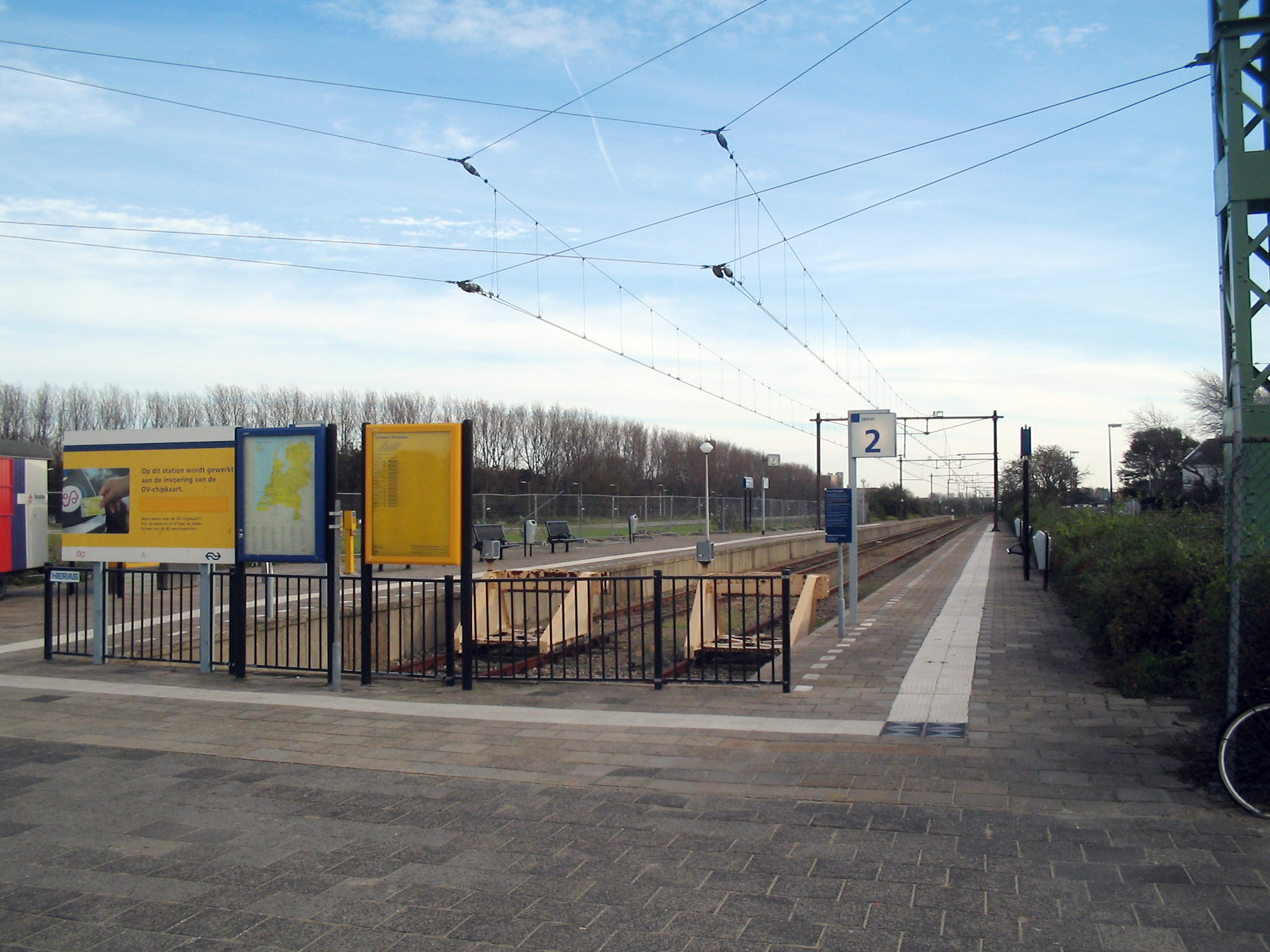

General information
- Location: Hook of Holland; Netherlands
- Coordinates: 51°58′58″N 4°7′10″E
- Operator: Nederlandse Spoorwegen
- Line: Schiedam–Hoek van Holland railway
- Platforms: 2

Other information
- Station code: Hlds

History
- Opened: 1893
- Closed: 1 April 2017 (end of NS service)

Services
Preceding station	Nederlandse Spoorwegen	Following station
Terminus	NS Sprinter 4000	Hoek van Holland Haven towards Rotterdam Centraal
Location
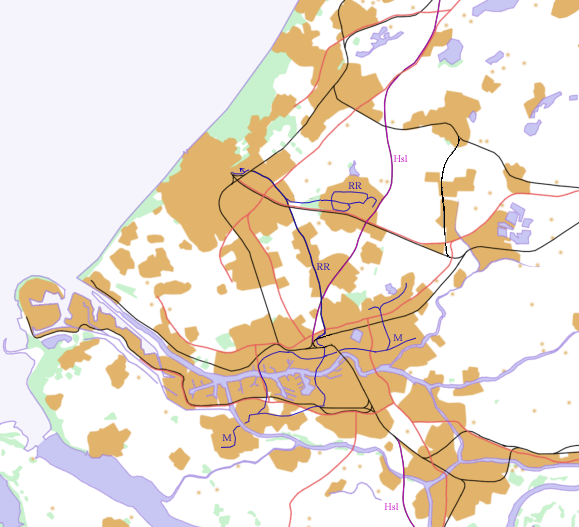
- Location within Southwest Randstad Location within Netherlands

Hoek van Holland Strand station was the terminus of the Hoekse Lijn until 1 April 2017.

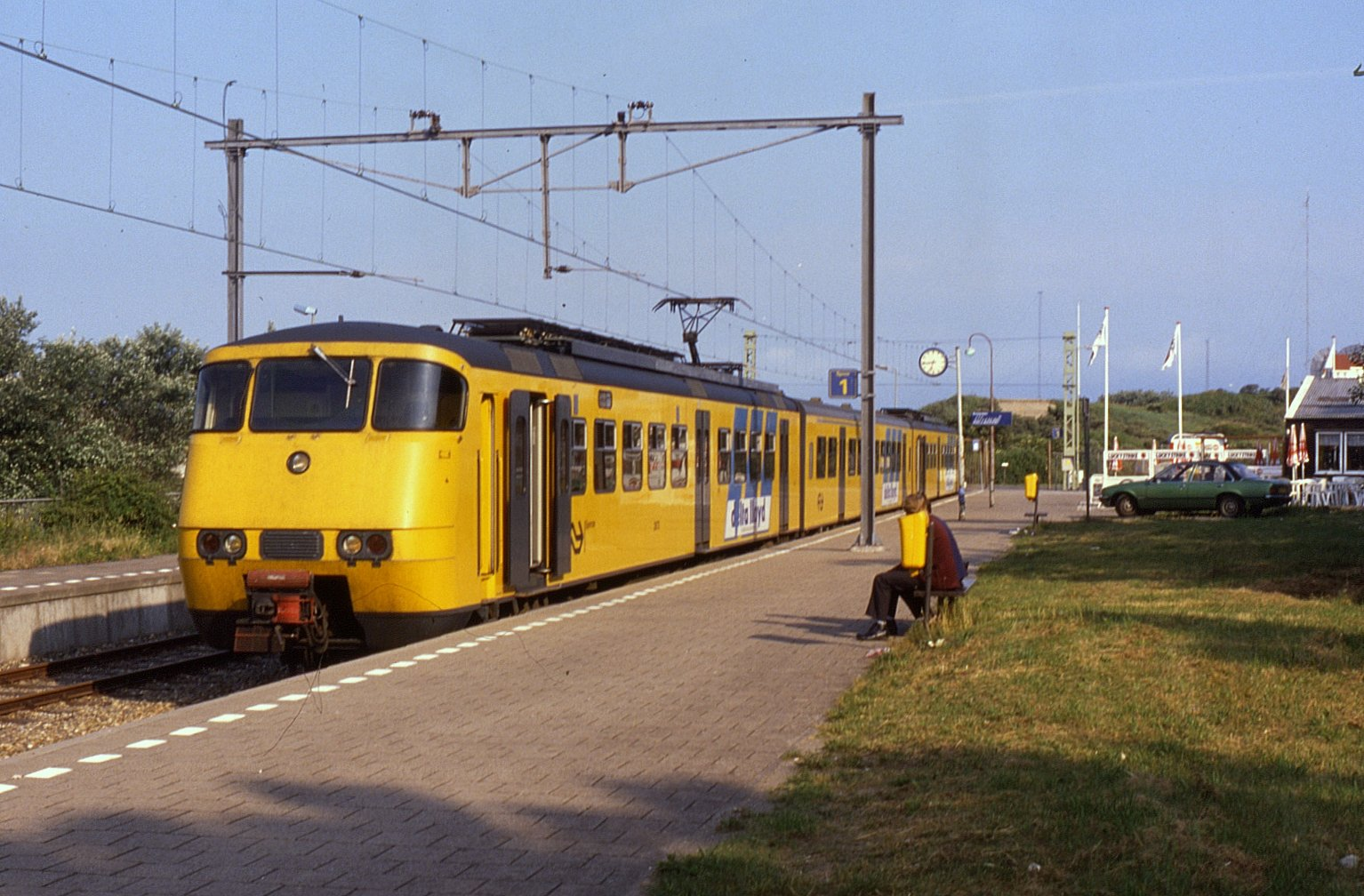
Hoek van Holland Strand. Sprinter nr. 2873 waits for departure to Rotterdam Central; 16 June 1990

This railway station in Hoek van Holland was opened on 1 June 1893 . It was approximately 700 meters further west than Hoek van Holland Haven station, with limited trains running to the station outside the summer months. Due to the construction of the Maasvlakte in 1971, the coastline came to lie further out to sea than when the station was opened, so that afterwards the station was no longer close to the beach, but more than a kilometre (about a 15-minute walk) away.

== New metro station ==
On 1 April 2017, the Hoekse Lijn was taken over by the Rotterdam-The Hague Metropolitan Region and converted into a metro line that came into use on 30 September 2019. From 1 April 2017 to 31 March 2023 there was replacement bus transport to the Badweg near the beach of Hoek van Holland.

As part of the renovation of the Hoekse Lijn into a metro line, the old Hoek van Holland Strand station closed on 1 April 2017. On 31 March 2023, a new Hoek van Holland Strand metro station was opened near the beach, for which the track has been extended by 900 metres.

== Former freight lines ==
There were 2 more railway lines at this height; the " Strand line " and the Westlandsche Stoomtramweg Maatschappij (WSM) tram both came on standard gauge from or next to the dunes, both served for freight transport. The beach line connected to the NS tracks and crossed the WSM branch line, which ended approximately here. The WSM line disappeared in 1951, and is now partly a cycle path. The beach line disappeared in 1971.
