= Vijfsluizen metro station =

Metro station in Schiedam, Netherlands

Vijfsluizen
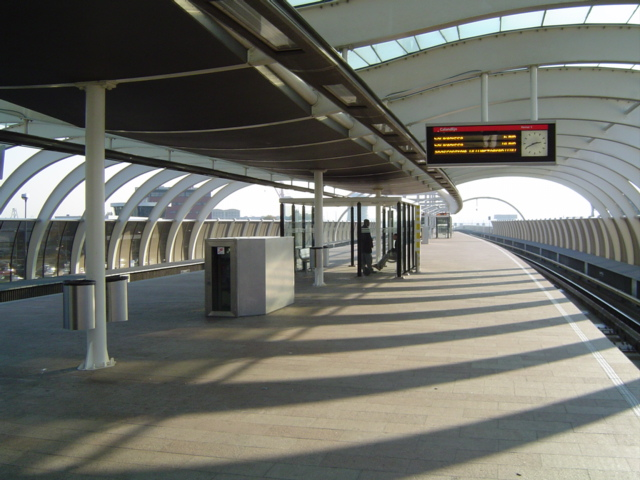

General information
- Coordinates: 51°54′32″N 4°22′19″E
- System: Rotterdam Metro station
- Owner: RET
- Platforms: Side platforms
- Tracks: 2

Construction
- Structure type: Elevated

History
- Opened: 2002

Services
Preceding station	Rotterdam Metro	Following station
Pernis towards De Akkers	Line C	Troelstralaan towards De Terp
Location

Vijfsluizen is an above-ground of Rotterdam Metro line C. The station is located in the Vlaardingen area of the City of Schiedam, adjoining Rotterdam. It was designed by Zwarts & Jansma architects and entered service with the opening of the line on 4 November 2002. Vijfsluizen station is an important transfer point between the metro and buses.
