= Maassluis Steendijkpolder metro station =

Metro station in South Holland

Steendijkpolder
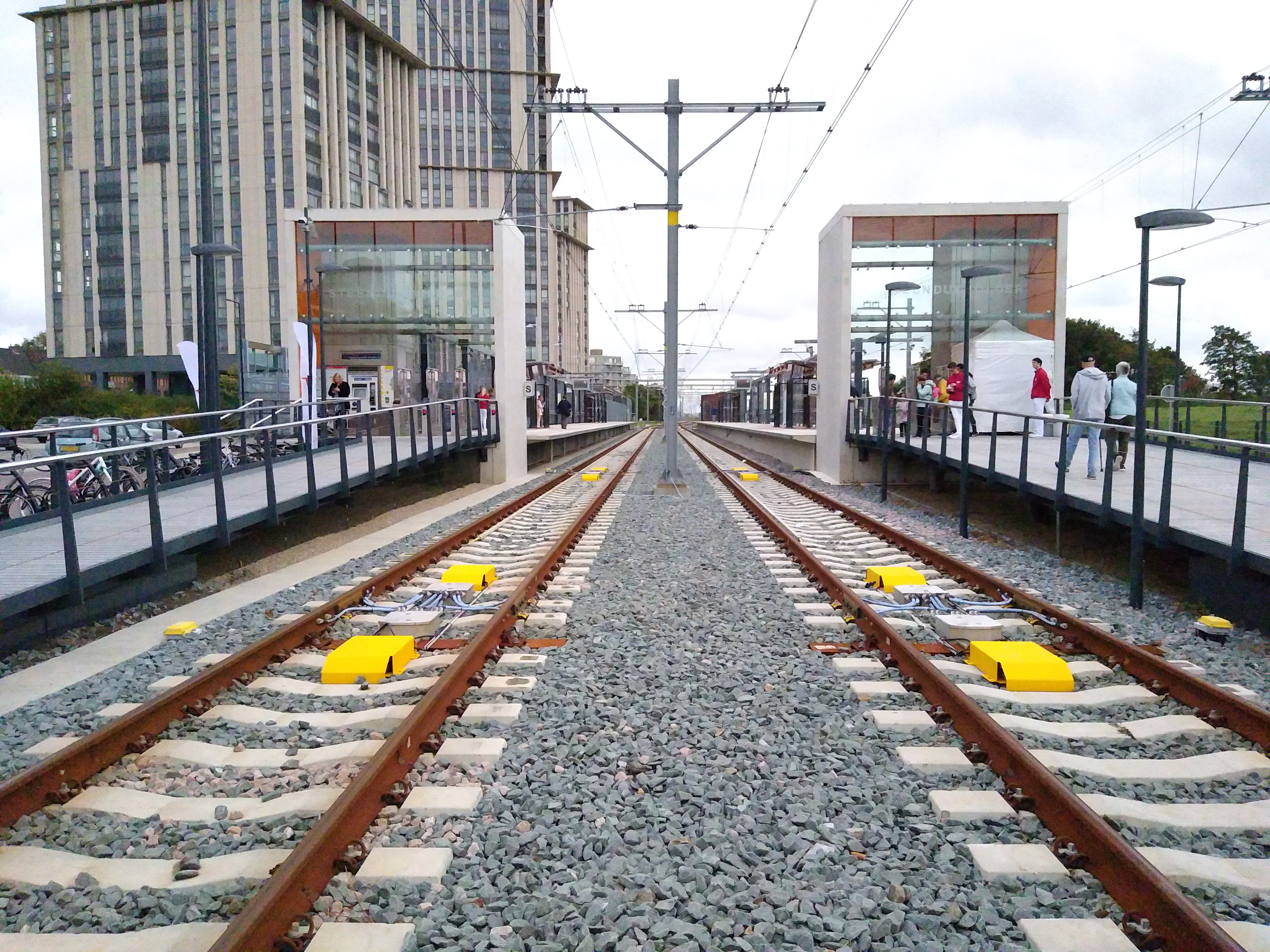

General information
- Coordinates: 51°58′44.6″N 4°13′37″E
- System: Rotterdam Metro station
- Owner: RET
- Platforms: 1 Island platform 1 Side platform
- Tracks: 3

History
- Opened: 30 September 2019

Services
Preceding station	Rotterdam Metro	Following station
Hoek van Holland Haven towards Hoek van Holland Strand	Line B	Maassluis West towards Nesselande
Location

Steendijkpolder is a metro station on Line B of the Rotterdam Metro located in Maassluis, South Holland. The station entered regular service on 30 September 2019. Although it is located on the former Hoekse Lijn, converted from a railway, this is the only station of the line which never was a railway station and was constructed in 2019, when the railway was converted into rapid transit. Steendijkpolder consists of a side platform for westbound services toward Hook of Holland, and an island platform used by eastbound services toward Nesselande.

== Services ==
Three trains per hour operate on Line B through Steendijkpolder between Hoek van Holland Haven and Nesselande, and an additional three trains per hour operate only between Steendijkpolder and Nesselande. Services terminating at Steendijkpolder use the centre track while the outer tracks are used by through services.
