= Hook of Holland =

Hook of Holland Hoek van Holland
- Village
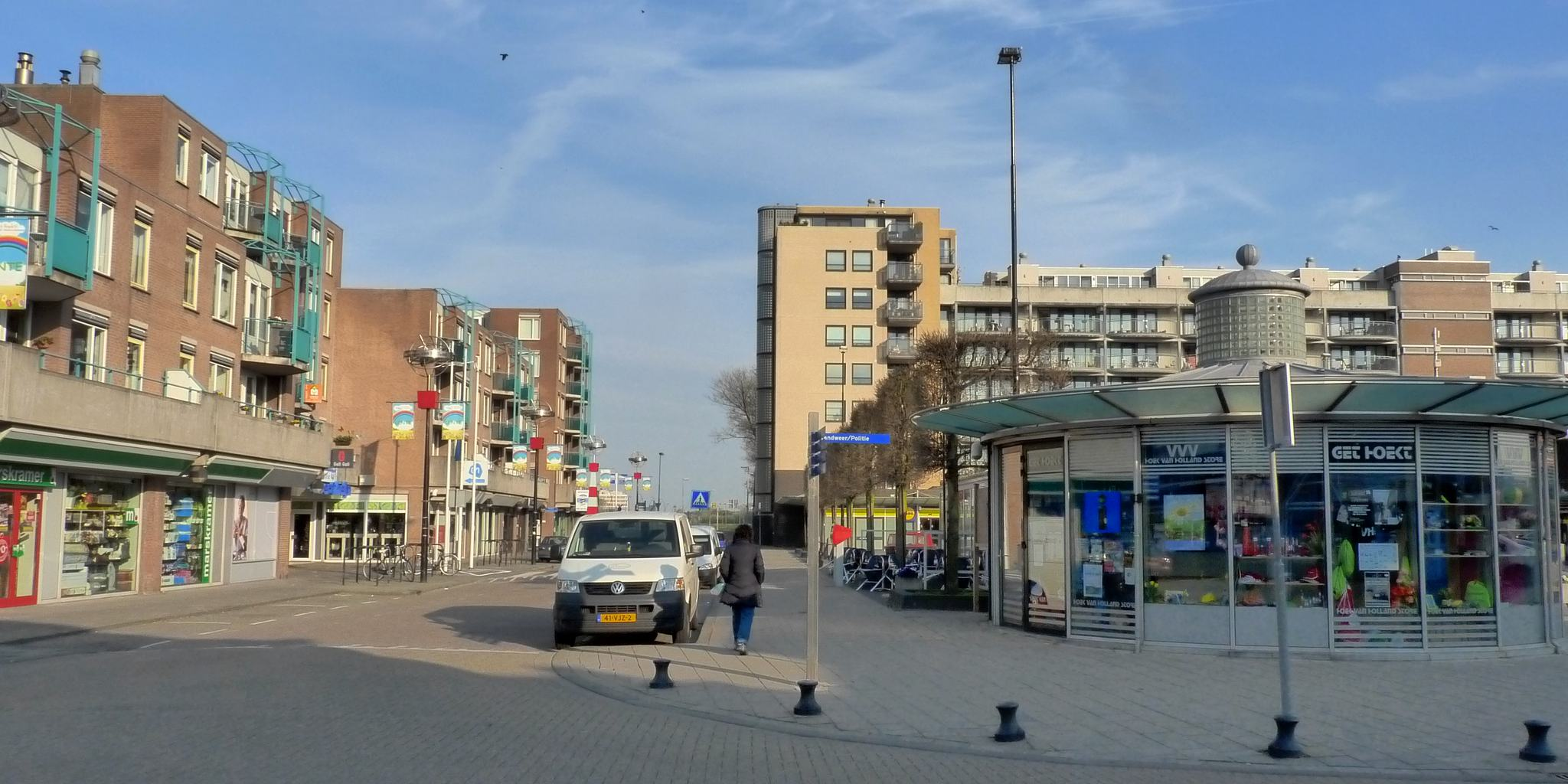
- Hook of Holland's centre

- Flag Coat of arms

- Location within Netherlands Location within North Sea
- Coordinates: 51°58′52″N 4°7′43″E
- Country: Netherlands
- Province: South Holland
- Municipality: Rotterdam

Area
  - Total: 18.53 km^{2} (7.15 sq mi)

Population (1 January 2023)
  - Total: 10,560
- Postal code: 3150 – 3151
- Major roads: N211 N220
- Dialing code: 0174
- Website: https://www.rotterdam.nl/hoek-van-holland

Hook of Holland (Dutch: Hoek van Holland, pronounced [ˈɦuk fɑn ˈɦɔlɑnt]) (Note: Van in isolation: [vɑn].) is a coastal village in the southwestern corner of Holland, hence the name; hoek means "corner" and was in use before the word kaap – "cape". The English translation using Hook is a false friend of the Dutch Hoek, but has become commonplace in the Netherlands (in official government records in English, the name tends not to get translated and Hoek van Holland is used). It is located at the mouth of the New Waterway shipping canal into the North Sea. The village is administered as a district of the municipality of Rotterdam. Its district covers an area of 18.53 km^{2}, of which 14.19 km^{2} is land. On 1 January 2023 it had an estimated population of 10,560.

Settlements near "the Hook" (de Hoek) include the small towns Monster, Naaldwijk and 's-Gravenzande and the city Delft to the northeast, and the town Maassluis to the southeast. On the other side of the river is the harbor Europoort and the Maasvlakte. The wide sandy beach, one section of which is designated for use by naturists, runs for approximately 18 kilometres to Scheveningen and for most of this distance is backed by extensive sand dunes through which there are foot and cycle paths. On the north side of the New Waterway, to the west of the village, is a pier, part of which is accessible to pedestrians and cyclists.

The Berghaven is a small harbour on the New Waterway where the Rotterdam and Europoort pilots are based. This small harbour is only for the use of the pilot service, government vessels and the Hook of Holland lifeboat.

== History ==
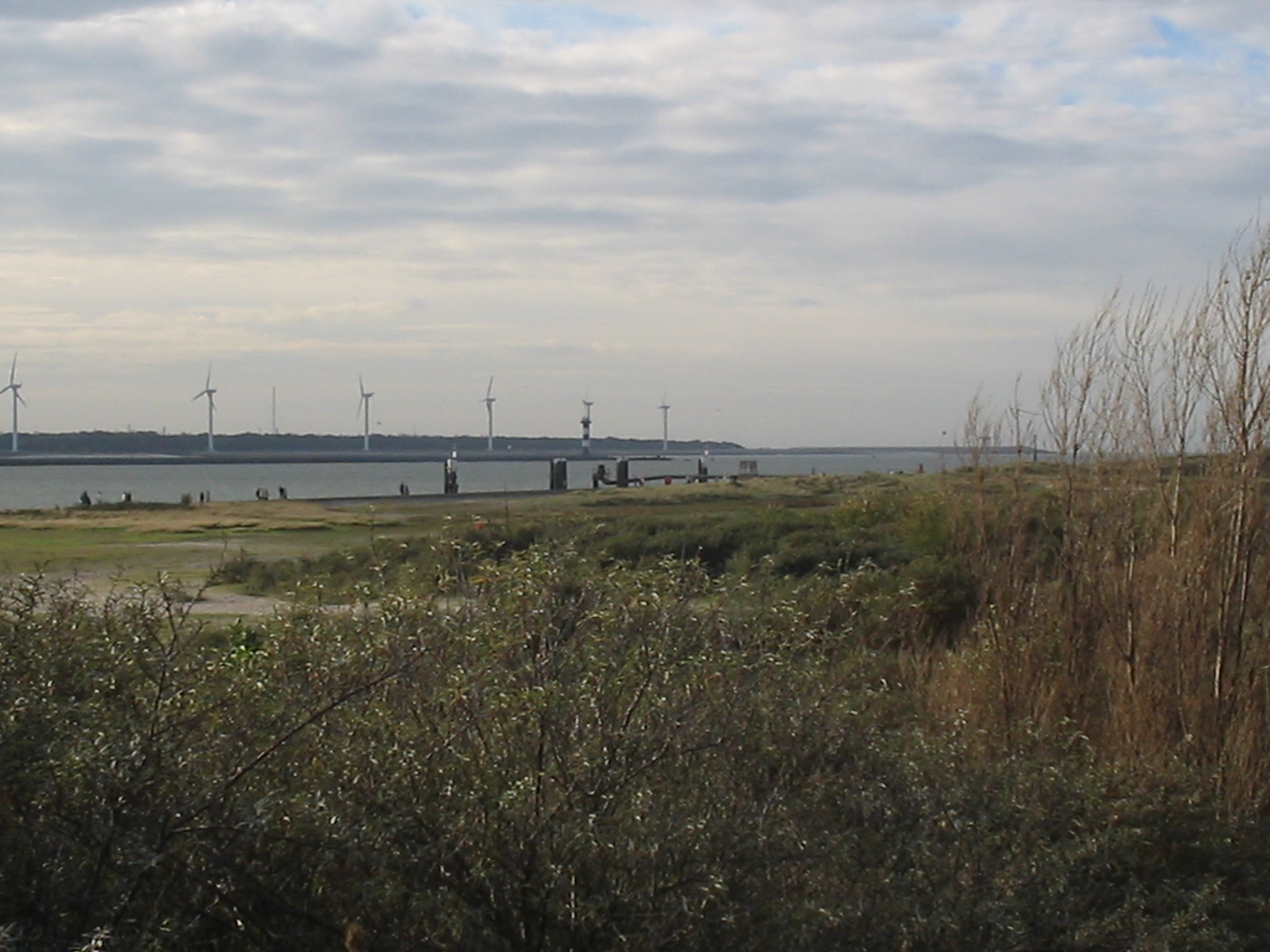
Dunes

The Hook of Holland area was created as a sandbar in the Maas estuary, when it became more and more silted after St. Elizabeth's flood of 1421. All kinds of plans were designed to improve the shipping channel to Rotterdam. In 1863 it was finally decided to construct the New Waterway which was dug between 1866 and 1868. The route ran through the Hook of Holland, where a primitive settlement, Old Hook (Oude Hoek – nowadays the Zuidelijk Strandcentrum), was created. Many workers and senior employees of the Rijkswaterstaat settled in Old Hook.

The Hook initially fell under the administrative authority of 's-Gravenzande. An attempt by the inhabitants to transform the place into an independent municipality failed and, on 1 January 1914, Hook of Holland was added to Rotterdam. After the First World War the village started to develop into a seaside resort. It has since been informally known as 'Rotterdam by the sea'.

During World War II, the Hook was one of the most important places for the Wehrmacht to hold because of its harbour, which comprised an important and strategic part of the Atlantic Wall. The German Army installed three 11" guns (removed from the damaged battleship Gneisenau) as shore batteries to protect the port area from invasion.

Hook of Holland already had a ward council in 1947 and has been a borough since 1973. In 2014, it was replaced by an "area committee".

== Kindertransport monument ==
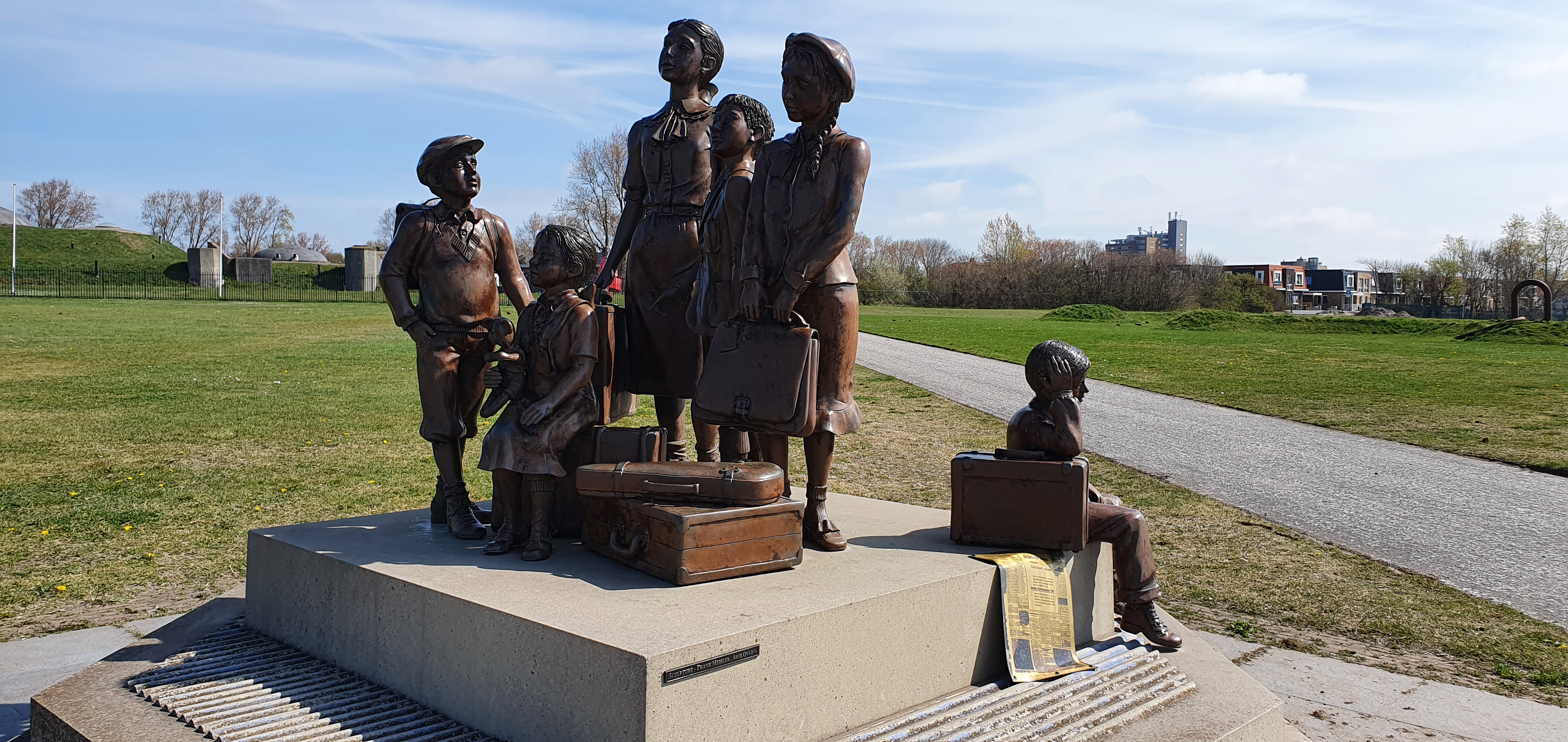
Channel Crossing to Life, Frank Meisler, unveiled November 2011

The kindertransport, with which Jewish children from Germany, Austria, Poland and Czechoslovakia could be brought to England from December 1938 until the outbreak of World War II, usually went from the children's home stations to the Netherlands by train. The crossing to Harwich then largely took place from Hook of Holland. The transports were supported by the Dutch government and by volunteers. The first transport, which started on December 1, 1938, at the Berlin Anhalter Bahnhof, reached England on December 2, 1938. When the transport was allowed, the British government stipulated that the children could not be older than seventeen and that their parents could not come along. The Nazis stipulated, among other things, that the children at the railway station were not allowed to say goodbye to those left behind. By the time the war broke out in 1939, approximately 10,000 children had been brought to Britain in this way.

== Transport links ==
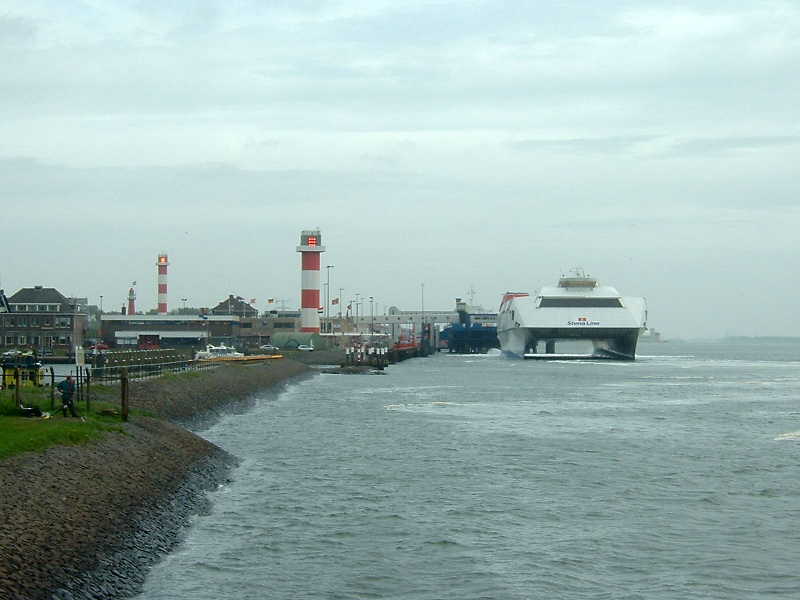
Ferry terminal on the New Waterway, with the HSS Discovery in the background

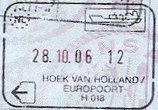
Passport stamp issued at the ferry terminal to passengers to or from the UK

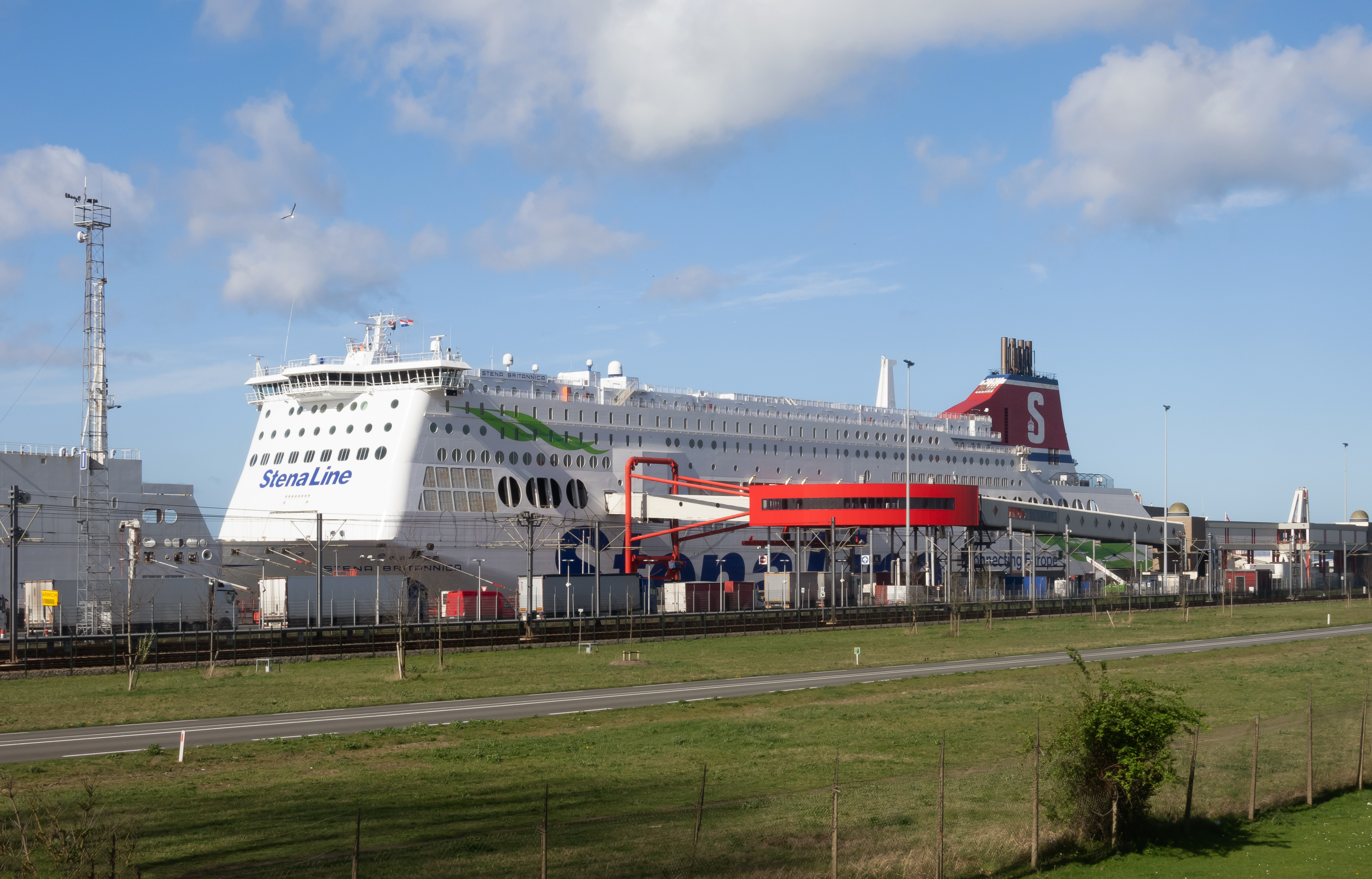
Hook of Holland, the berth of Stena Line

=== Railways ===
The Schiedam–Hoek van Holland railway was a 24-kilometre train service branch line from Schiedam Centrum station via Vlaardingen and Maassluis. The final two stations on the line were located within the village. Hoek van Holland Haven, the penultimate station, was close to the village centre, adjacent to the ferry terminal and the small harbour, the Berghaven. Hoek van Holland Strand, the terminus, is closest to the beach. The railway line opened for service in 1893 and was electrified in 1935. International trains ran from Berlin and Moscow to connected these with London via the ferry service. From 1928 to 1939 and from 1962 to 1979, Hook of Holland was the northern terminus of the Rheingold Express to Frankfurt and Geneva. Services on the line to Rotterdam Centraal station were operated by NS every half-hour during the day until April 2017, when the line was closed.

It was then converted to a metro/lightrail system. It was reopened in September 2019, as an extension of the Rotterdam Metro / lightrail. The metro/lightrail service from Hook of Holland terminates at the beach, stops at the redeveloped Hoek van Holland Haven metro station where it connects to the Stena Line ferry to Harwich. It connects to Dutch trains services at Schiedam Centrum station, Rotterdam Blaak station and Rotterdam Alexander station and after changing to other metro lines at Beurs metro station to Rotterdam Centraal.

=== Ferry ===
Hook of Holland is also the location of an international ferry terminal, from which service to eastern England has operated since 1893 except for the durations of the two World Wars. Currently, two routes are operated: one, a day-and-night freight and passenger service to Harwich, Essex, and the other, a night, freight-only service to North Killingholme Haven, Lincolnshire. The passenger ferry service is operated by Stena Line as part of the Dutchflyer rail-ferry service between Hook van Holland Haven station and Harwich International station in England, from which Greater Anglia provides service to Liverpool Street station in central London.

A local ferry operated by RET links the Hook with the Maasvlakte part of the Port of Rotterdam.

=== Motorways ===
The A20 motorway begins approximately 10 kilometres east of Hook of Holland near Westerlee, heading east towards Rotterdam and Utrecht. It connects to the A4 heading north towards The Hague and Amsterdam 17 kilometres east of the village.

== Climate ==
Climate data for Hook of Holland (1991−2020 normals, extremes 1901−present)
Month	Jan	Feb	Mar	Apr	May	Jun	Jul	Aug	Sep	Oct	Nov	Dec	Year
Record high °C (°F)	14.2 (57.6)	18.7 (65.7)	22.8 (73.0)	28.7 (83.7)	32.7 (90.9)	33.8 (92.8)	38.9 (102.0)	34.8 (94.6)	32.5 (90.5)	25.9 (78.6)	19.7 (67.5)	15.6 (60.1)	38.9 (102.0)
Mean daily maximum °C (°F)	6.5 (43.7)	7.1 (44.8)	10.1 (50.2)	14.0 (57.2)	17.1 (62.8)	19.5 (67.1)	21.5 (70.7)	22.2 (72.0)	19.4 (66.9)	15.1 (59.2)	10.4 (50.7)	7.2 (45.0)	14.2 (57.6)
Daily mean °C (°F)	4.4 (39.9)	4.5 (40.1)	6.8 (44.2)	9.8 (49.6)	13.1 (55.6)	15.7 (60.3)	18.0 (64.4)	18.3 (64.9)	15.8 (60.4)	12.0 (53.6)	8.2 (46.8)	5.2 (41.4)	11.0 (51.8)
Mean daily minimum °C (°F)	2.3 (36.1)	2.0 (35.6)	3.8 (38.8)	6.2 (43.2)	9.4 (48.9)	12.2 (54.0)	14.5 (58.1)	14.7 (58.5)	12.5 (54.5)	9.2 (48.6)	5.6 (42.1)	3.1 (37.6)	8.0 (46.4)
Record low °C (°F)	−13.0 (8.6)	−12.3 (9.9)	−8.6 (16.5)	−2.5 (27.5)	1.5 (34.7)	5.1 (41.2)	8.5 (47.3)	8.4 (47.1)	0.5 (32.9)	−2.1 (28.2)	−6.0 (21.2)	−11.5 (11.3)	−13.0 (8.6)
Average precipitation mm (inches)	69.1 (2.72)	65.2 (2.57)	54.0 (2.13)	37.5 (1.48)	52.8 (2.08)	62.0 (2.44)	76.2 (3.00)	100.7 (3.96)	87.4 (3.44)	88.6 (3.49)	94.4 (3.72)	83.9 (3.30)	871.8 (34.32)
Average relative humidity (%)	85.9	83.8	80.7	75.5	76.2	78.0	78.5	78.2	79.5	82.3	85.8	86.5	80.9
Mean monthly sunshine hours	74.6	100.8	155.4	217.0	241.7	232.6	231.9	216.4	167.9	121.0	70.4	56.8	1,886.5
Percentage possible sunshine	28.8	35.8	42.1	52.2	49.8	46.6	46.2	47.6	44.1	36.6	26.4	23.4	40.0
Source: Royal Netherlands Meteorological Institute

== Notable people ==
- Jan Knippenberg (1948–1995), an ultrarunner and historian. In 1974, he ran from Hook of Holland to Stockholm, Sweden (1,600 km [990 mi]) in 18 days
- Richard de Mos (born 1976), a PVV politician, brought up in Hook of Holland
- Jesper Leerdam (born 1987) is a former footballer who played for the Dayton Dutch Lions, Excelsior Maassluis and SW Scheveningen
- Roy Kortsmit (born 1992), a professional footballer who currently plays as a goalkeeper for NAC Breda
- Bryan Janssen (born 1995), a former professional goalkeeper who plays for Kozakken Boys
