= Hoek van Holland Strand metro station =

Metro station in Hoek van Holland, Netherlands

Hoek van Holland Strand
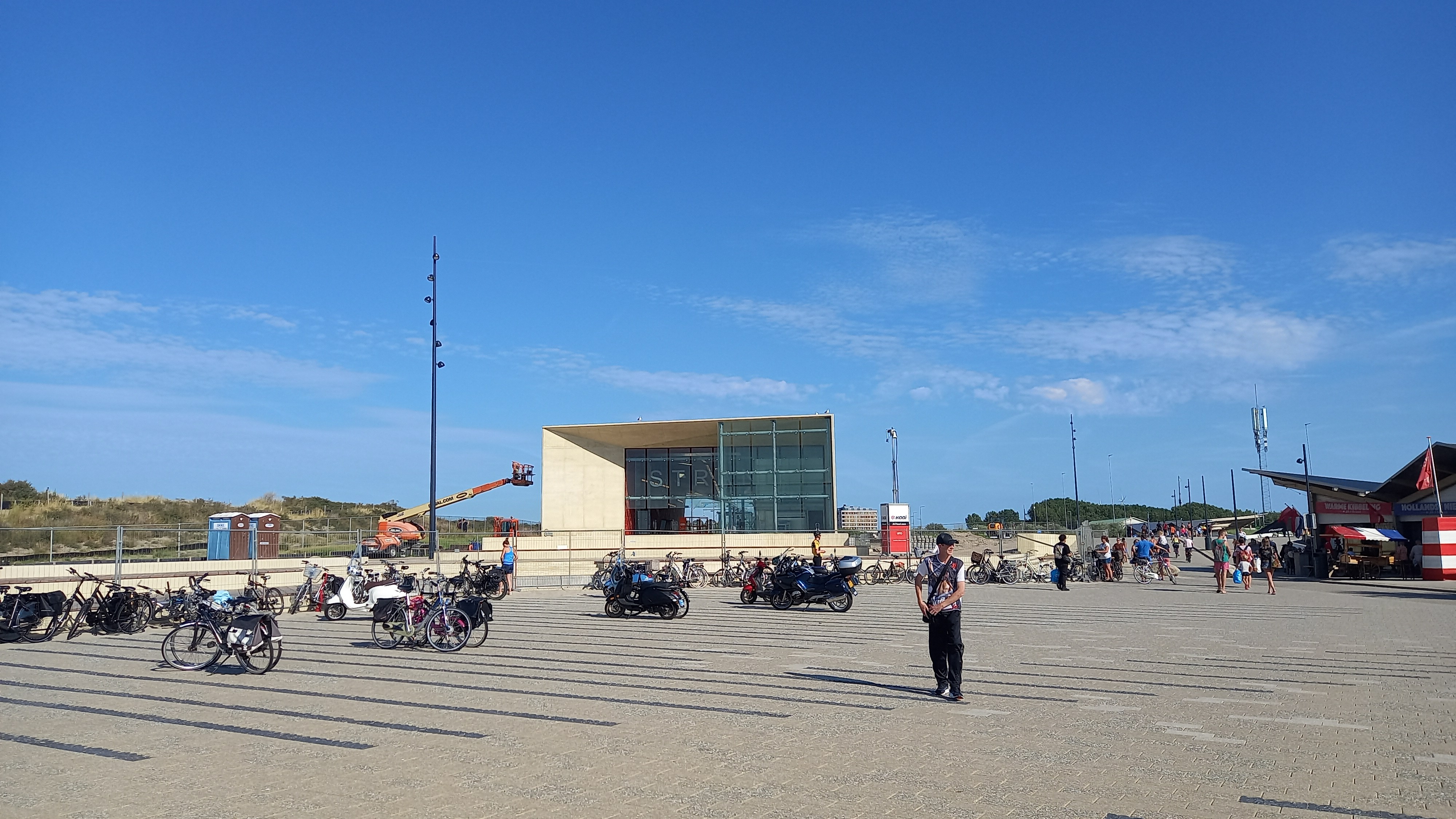

General information
- Location: Hook of Holland; Netherlands
- Coordinates: 51°59′10″N 4°6′24″E
- System: Rotterdam Metro station
- Operator: Rotterdam Metro
- Line: Schiedam–Hoek van Holland railway
- Platforms: 2

Other information
- Station code: Hlds

History
- Opened: 31 March 2023

Services
Preceding station	Rotterdam Metro	Following station
Terminus	Line B	Hoek van Holland Haven towards Nesselande
Location
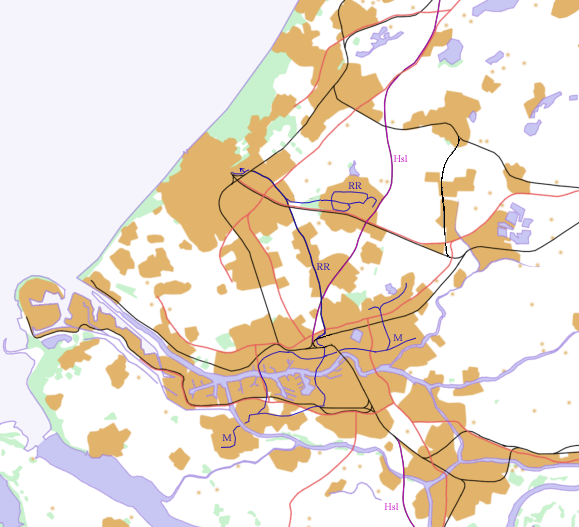
- Location within Southwest Randstad Location within Netherlands

Hoek van Holland Strand metro station is a metro station in Hook of Holland (Hoek van Holland), Netherlands. It consists of two tracks with side platforms. Its former site was the terminus of the Schiedam–Hoek van Holland railway to Rotterdam when it opened on 1 June 1893. Its name is derived from the nearby North Sea beach, strand being Dutch for “beach”.

The Nederlandse Spoorwegen stopped operating the line, including Hoek van Holland Strand railway station, on 1 April 2017, and the line was transferred to the Rotterdam Metro. Metro line B service opened as far as the preceding station, Hoek van Holland Haven metro station, on 30 September 2019.

After reconstruction of the rail infrastructure and the facilities, the opening of the replacement metro station took place on 31 March 2023, at which time it again became the western terminus of the line.

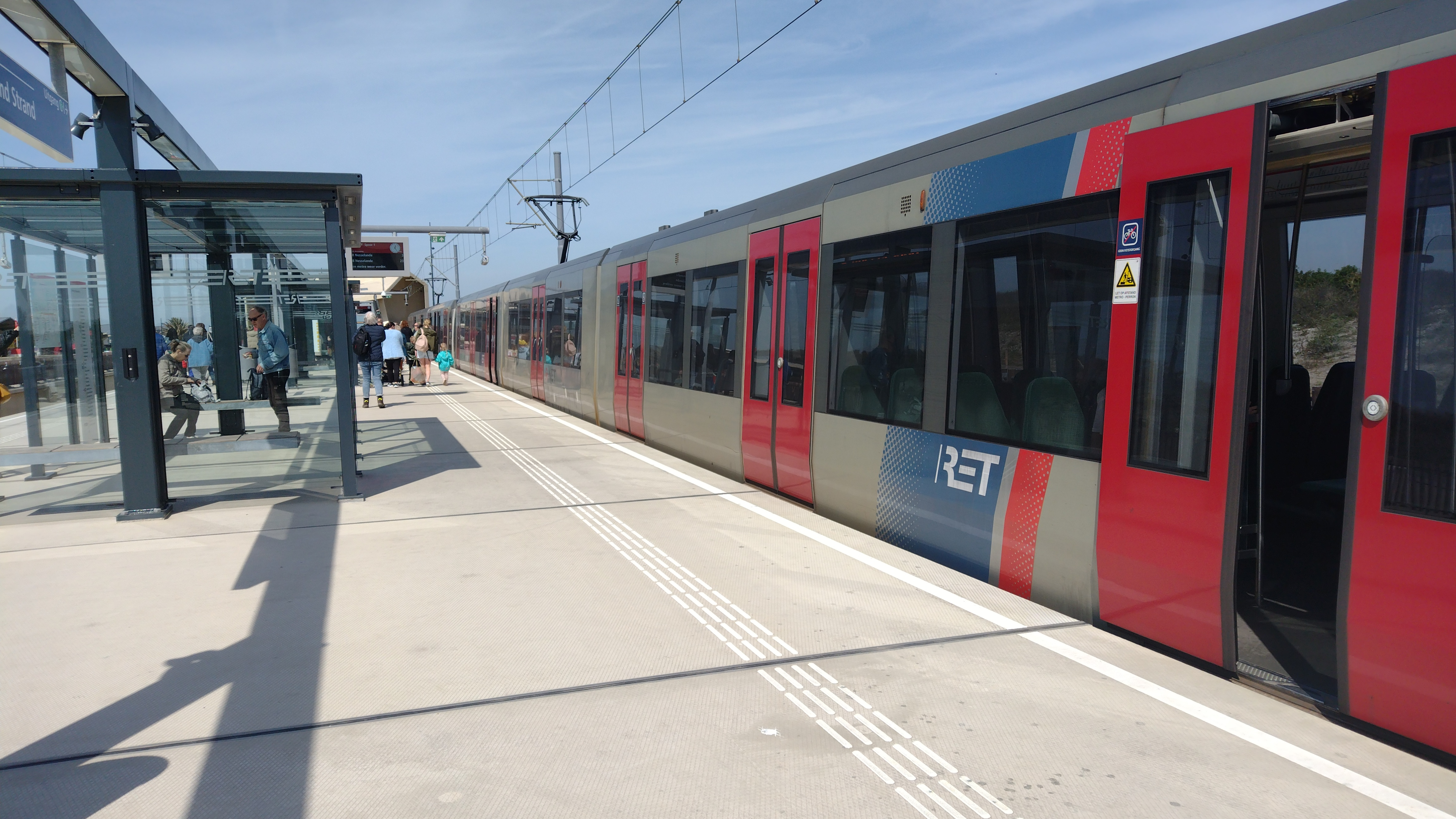
Platform 2

The new station is about 1 km further west than the original station, which had become almost 1 km inland after construction of the Maasvlakte moved the shoreline west. The new terminus is once again at the beach.

== Train services ==
The station reopened on 31 March 2023 and has a roughly 20 min service frequency towards Rotterdam City
