= Nesselande metro station =

Metro station in Rotterdam, Netherlands

Nesselande
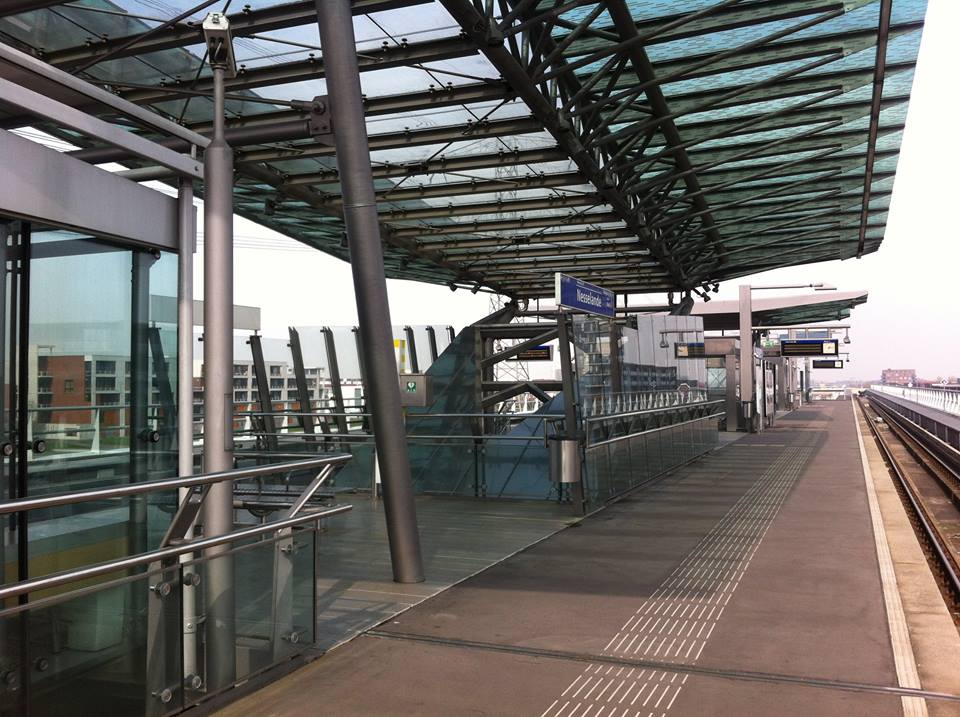

General information
- Coordinates: 51°58′44.6″N 4°35′11.5″E
- System: Rotterdam Metro station
- Owner: RET
- Platforms: Island platform
- Tracks: 2

Construction
- Structure type: Elevated

History
- Opened: 2005

Services
Preceding station	Rotterdam Metro	Following station
De Tochten towards Hoek van Holland Strand	Line B	Terminus
Location

Nesselande is a station on Line B of the Rotterdam Metro and is situated in Rotterdam-Nesselande. It is the northern terminus of the line.

The station, designed by architect Hans Moor, was opened on 29 August 2005 as part of the one-station extension of the East-West Line or Caland Line from its previous terminus De Tochten. Unlike the section between Capelsebrug and De Tochten, this section does not use overhead wires to provide traction power, but uses a third rail instead. The station consists of one island platform between two tracks.

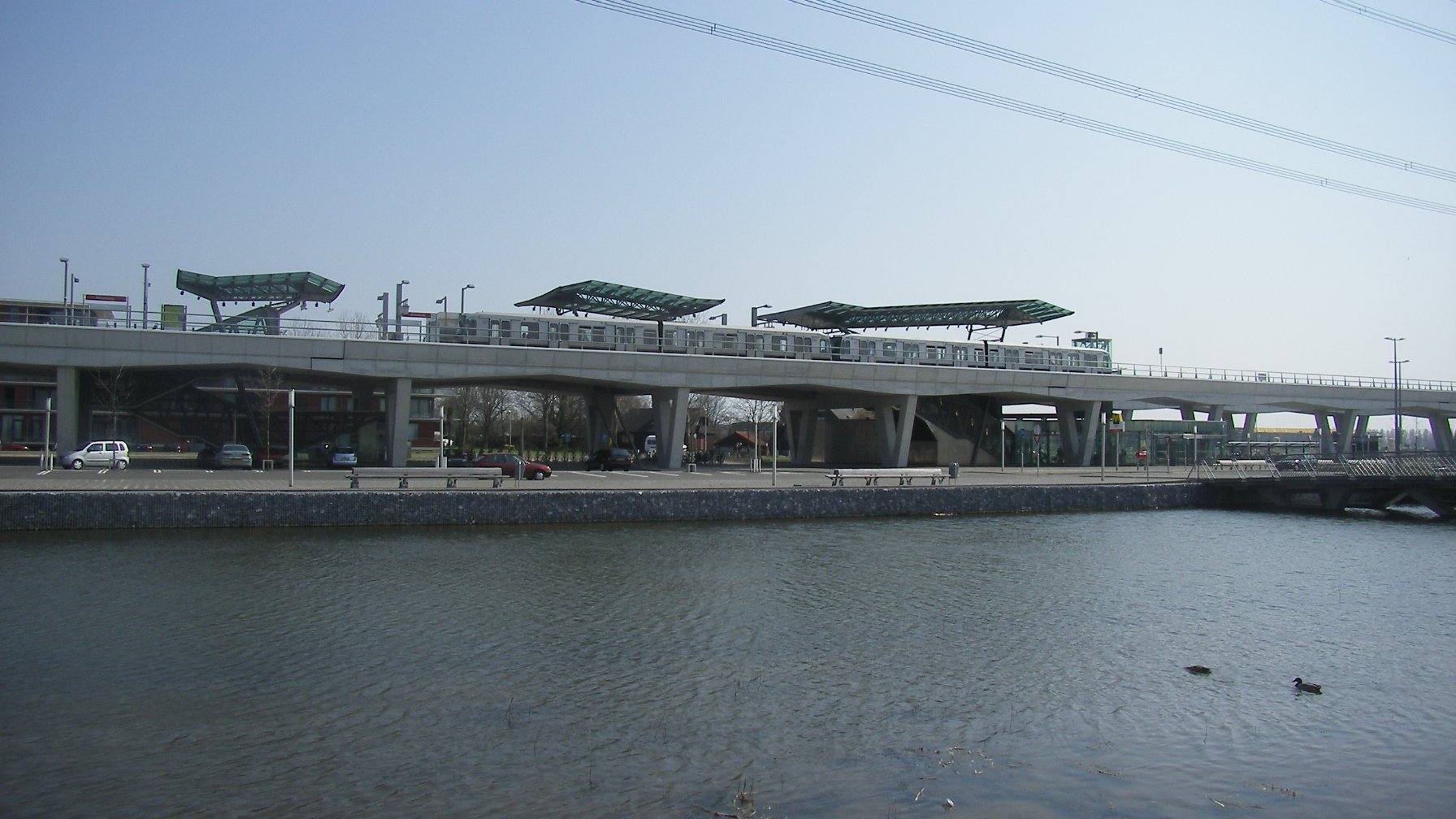
Nesselande station
