= Rotterdam Metro line B =

Rotterdam Metro Line B

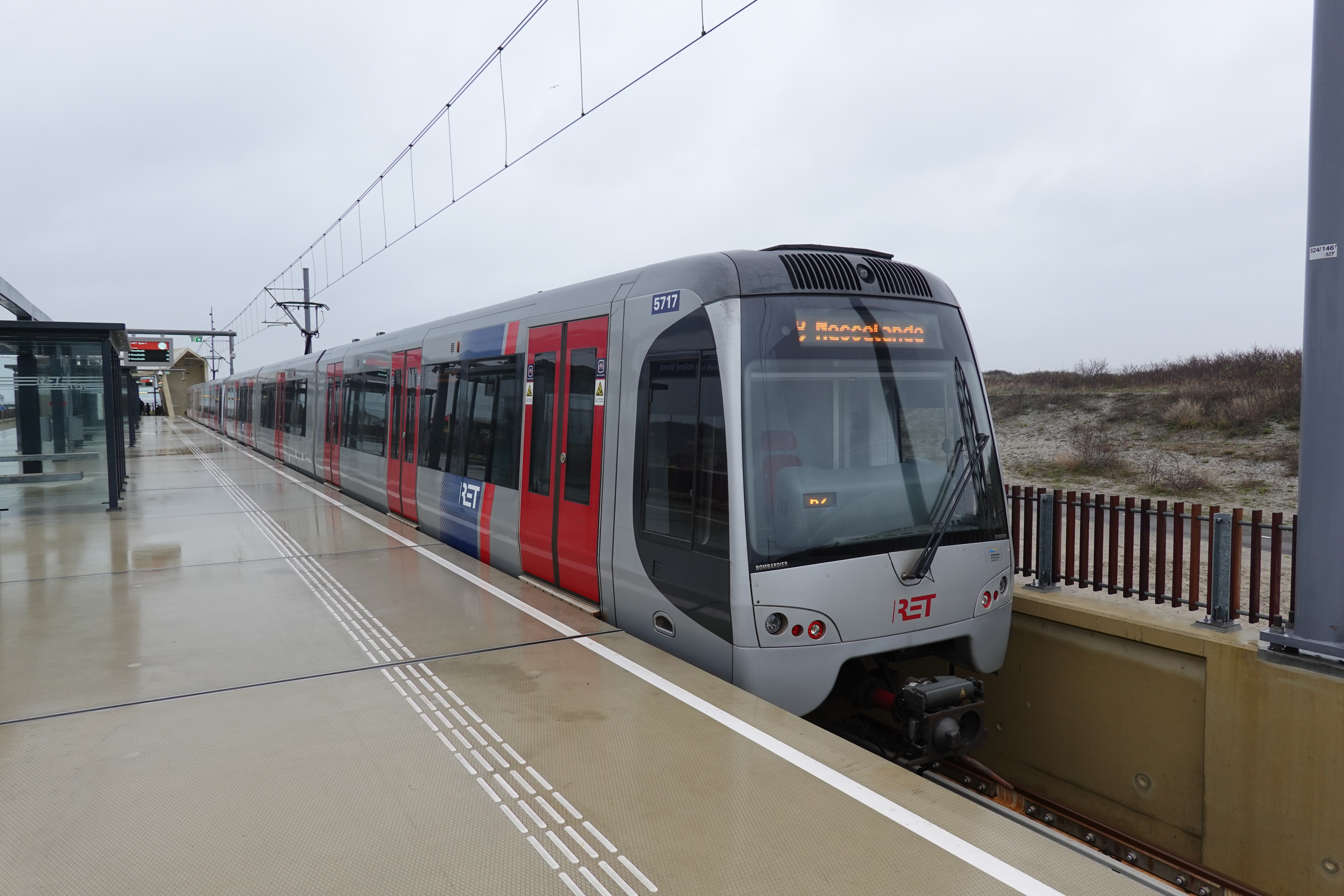
- Line B 5700 series train in March 2023

Overview
- Native name: Metrolijn B
- Owner: RET
- Locale: Rotterdam, Schiedam
- Termini: Nesselande; Hoek van Holland Strand
- Stations: 32
- Color on map: Yellow

Service
- Type: Rapid transit
- Operator(s): Rotterdam Metro
- Rolling stock: 5600 series 5700 series

History
- Opened: 6 May 1982; 44 years ago (Capelsebrug to Coolhaven)
- Last extension: 2023

Technical
- Line length: 43.1 km (26.8 mi)
- Number of tracks: Double-track
- Track gauge: 1,435 mm (4 ft 8 1/2 in)
- Electrification: 750 V DC; Overhead line Third rail
- Conduction system: With driver
- Operating speed: 100 km/h (62 mph)
Route map

The Rotterdam Metro Line B (Dutch: Metrolijn B) is a rapid transit line of the Rotterdam Metro. The line runs from Nesselande to Hoek van Holland Strand. Until each metro line received its own letter on 13 December 2009, it was part of the Caland Line. The line follows largely the same route as Line A; after Graskruid, the two lines split. The longer Line B connects the metro stations Nesselande and Hoek van Holland Strand, while the shorter Line A serves the busier central section of the route between Schiedam Centrum and Binnenhof.

Between De Tochten and Capelsebrug, and between Schiedam Nieuwland and Hoek van Holland Haven, the line is built as a light rail (sneltram) with overhead lines and level crossings. Line B is the longest metro line in the Benelux.

== Operations ==
The metro trains on line B run all day between the Hoek van Holland Strand and Nesselande stations. The frequency of the line is as shown in the table below.

Hour(s)	Weekly frequencies				Holiday frequencies			
Hour(s)	Monday to Thursday	Friday	Saturday	Sunday	Monday to Thursday	Friday	Saturday	Sunday
05.30 - 07.00	4×/hour	4×/hour	-	-	4×/hour	4×/hour	-	-
07.00 - 08.00	6×/hour	6×/hour	4×/hour*	2×/hour	4×/hour	4×/hour	4×/hour*	2×/hour
08.00 - 11.00	6×/hour	6×/hour	4×/hour*	4×/hour*	4×/hour	4×/hour	4×/hour*	4×/hour*
11.00 - 18.00	6×/hour	6×/hour	6×/hour	4×/hour	4×/hour	4×/hour	4×/hour	4×/hour
18.00 - 19.00	6×/hour	6×/hour	4×/hour	4×/hour	4×/hour	4×/hour	4×/hour	4×/hour
19.00 - 00.30	4×/hour*	4×/hour*	4×/hour*	4×/hour*	4×/hour*	4×/hour*	4×/hour*	4×/hour*
00.30 - 01.30	-	2×/hour	2×/hour	-	-	2×/hour	2×/hour	-

The line is operated from the 's-Gravenweg depot. Before the extension to Hoek van Holland, Line B services were linked to Line A from Monday to Saturday, and the metro trains originating in Nesselande returned to Binnenhof via Schiedam Centrum and vice versa.

The frequency between Steendijkpolder and Hoek van Holland Strand is halved, except on Sundays during the summer period.

== Stations ==
Station	Transfers	Location
Nesselande		Prins Alexander
De Tochten		Prins Alexander
Ambachtsland		Prins Alexander
Nieuw Verlaat		Prins Alexander
Hesseplaats		Prins Alexander
Graskruid	A Line A	Prins Alexander
Rotterdam Alexander	A Line A; Utrecht–Rotterdam railway	Prins Alexander
Oosterflank	A Line A	Prins Alexander
Prinsenlaan	A Line A	Prins Alexander
Schenkel	A Line A	Prins Alexander
Capelsebrug	A Line A; C Line C	Kralingen
Kralingse Zoom	A Line A; C Line C	Kralingen
Voorschoterlaan	A Line A; C Line C	Kralingen
Gerdesiaweg	A Line A; C Line C	Kralingen
Oostplein	A Line A; C Line C	Centrum
Rotterdam Blaak	A Line A; C Line C; Breda–Rotterdam railway	Centrum
Beurs	A Line A; C Line C; D Line D; E Line E	Centrum
Eendrachtsplein	A Line A; C Line C	Centrum
Dijkzigt	A Line A; C Line C	Centrum
Coolhaven	A Line A; C Line C	Delfshaven
Delfshaven	A Line A; C Line C	Delfshaven
Marconiplein	A Line A; C Line C	Delfshaven
Schiedam Centrum	A Line A; C Line C; Amsterdam–Rotterdam railway; Schiedam–Hoek van Holland railway	Schiedam
Schiedam Nieuwland	A Line A	Schiedam
Vlaardingen Oost	A Line A	Vlaardingen
Vlaardingen Centrum	A Line A	Vlaardingen
Vlaardingen West	A Line A	Vlaardingen
Maassluis Centrum		Maasluis
Maassluis West		Maasluis
Maasluis Steendijkpolder		Maasluis
Hoek van Holland Haven		Hook of Holland
Hoek van Holland Strand		Hook of Holland

== History ==
On 24 April 1984, the East–West Line, which at the time ran from Binnenhof to Coolhaven (the current Line A), was expanded with a branch from Graskruid to De Tochten in the Zevenkamp district. On 25 April 1986, the line was extended westward to Marconiplein. Together with the line to Binnenhof, this formed the basis of the East–West Line for many years. In the early period, metro trains to Zevenkamp and Ommoord ran coupled together up to Rotterdam-Alexander, after which the train was split into one or two carriages toward Zevenkamp and one carriage toward Ommoord. On the return trip, the trains were coupled again. However, this caused several practical issues, so on 1 April 1985, the practice was abandoned, and separate trains operated from the city center to Ommoord and Zevenkamp.

After a second branch was opened in 1994 to Capelle aan den IJssel, a westward extension from Marconiplein followed on 4 November 2002, connecting via Schiedam and Pernis to the new Tussenwater station on Metro Line D toward De Akkers. Between 2002 and 2005, trains from De Tochten also ran at certain times over the new route to De Akkers. Since 29 August 2005, when the line was extended by one station from De Tochten to Nesselande, the trains no longer continued beyond Schiedam Centrum.

The line has been renamed several times over the years. Originally, together with the current Metro Line A, it formed the East–West Line. In 1994, when the branch to Capelle aan den IJssel entered service, the metro lines were assigned line colors, with the line to Zevenkamp designated in red. Until 2005, trains heading to De Tochten displayed the district name Zevenkamp as their final destination on the vehicle, instead of the terminus name De Tochten. In 1997, the name East–West Line was replaced by Caland Line, with red as the color for all three branches. From 13 December 2009, RET discontinued the name Caland Line; since then, the line has been known as Metro Line B, with yellow as its line color.

=== Hoekse Line reconstruction ===
The former railway line Schiedam Centrum – Hoek van Holland Strand, known as the Hoekse Lijn, was closed to train traffic on 31 March 2017 and subsequently converted for metro service. When the Schiedam Centrum metro station was built in 2000, preparations had already been made for this extension, as a section of track was constructed directly west of the station pointing toward the Hoekse Lijn. Initially, the extension was scheduled to open in September 2017, but this deadline was not met, and the opening date was postponed five times. Construction costs also exceeded the budget by 90 million euros.

Since 30 September 2019, the line has been connected to the metro network at Schiedam Centrum, and Line B has since continued to Hoek van Holland Haven.

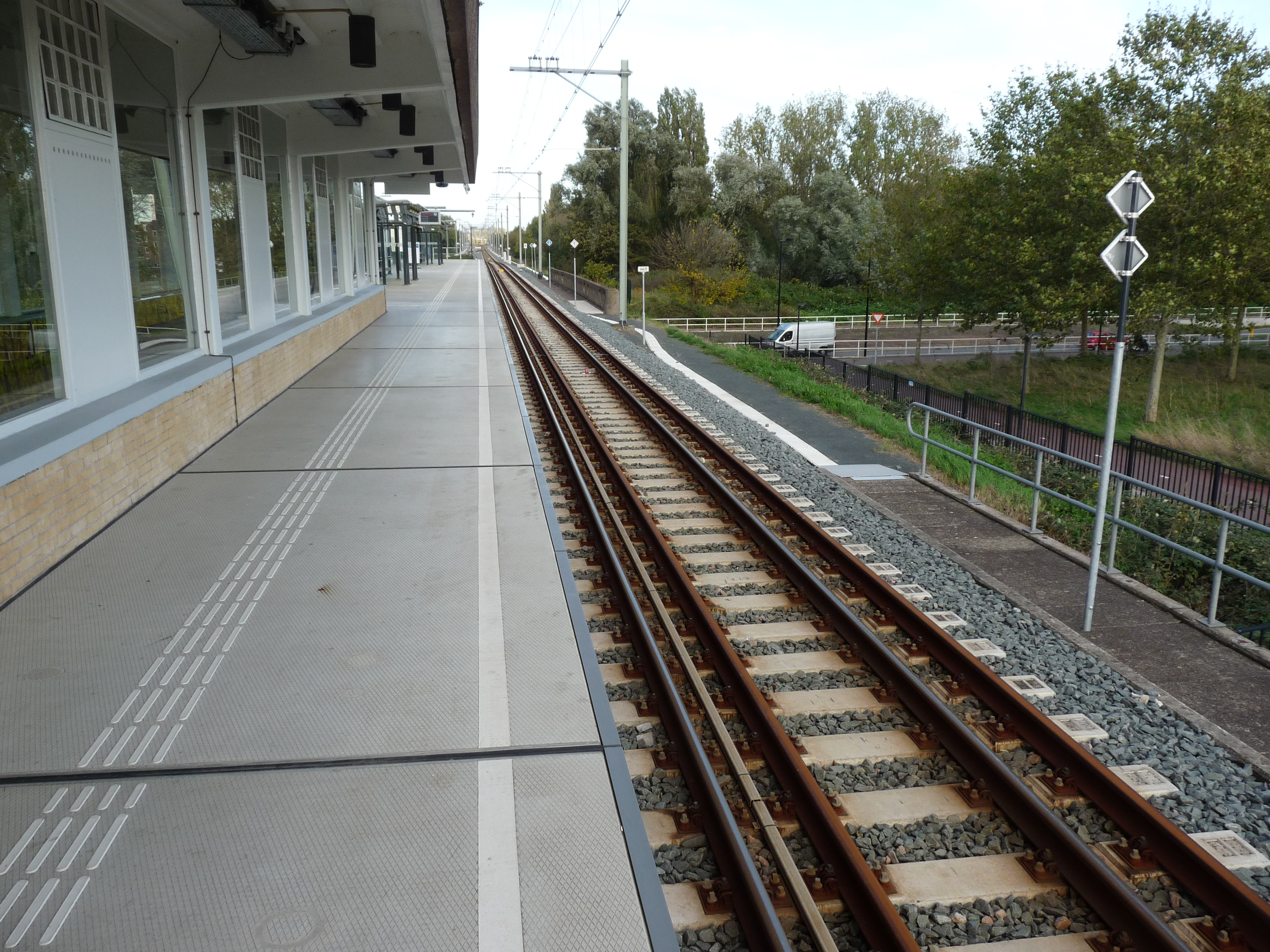
The rust-brown rails are for wider freight trains and are further from the platform than the metallic rails for metro trains at Vlaardingen Oost Station

A notable feature of this metro line is that between Schiedam and Vlaardingen (the Vopak terminal in the Vulcaanhaven), the track can also be used by freight trains. Since these trains are wider than metro trains, interlaced tracks (strengelspoor) were installed so that freight trains do not hit the platform. The rest of the line up to Maassluis is prepared for the installation of freight tracks.

The stations along the line between Schiedam Nieuwland and Hoek van Holland Haven feature a sunset theme designed by architect Marc Verheijen, with stations closer to Rotterdam having a yellow theme, and gradually shifting toward deep sunset colors closer to the sea. A wave-pattern relief is also incorporated into the stations, referencing the sea.

==== Metro aan Zee ====
Metro aan Zee is the name for the final part of the extension of Line B (including the new stations Hoek van Holland Haven and Hoek van Holland Strand). It was opened on 31 March 2023.

=== Other projects ===
As part of the Integrale Visie Alexanderknoop project, Alexander station may be relocated.

== Rolling stock ==
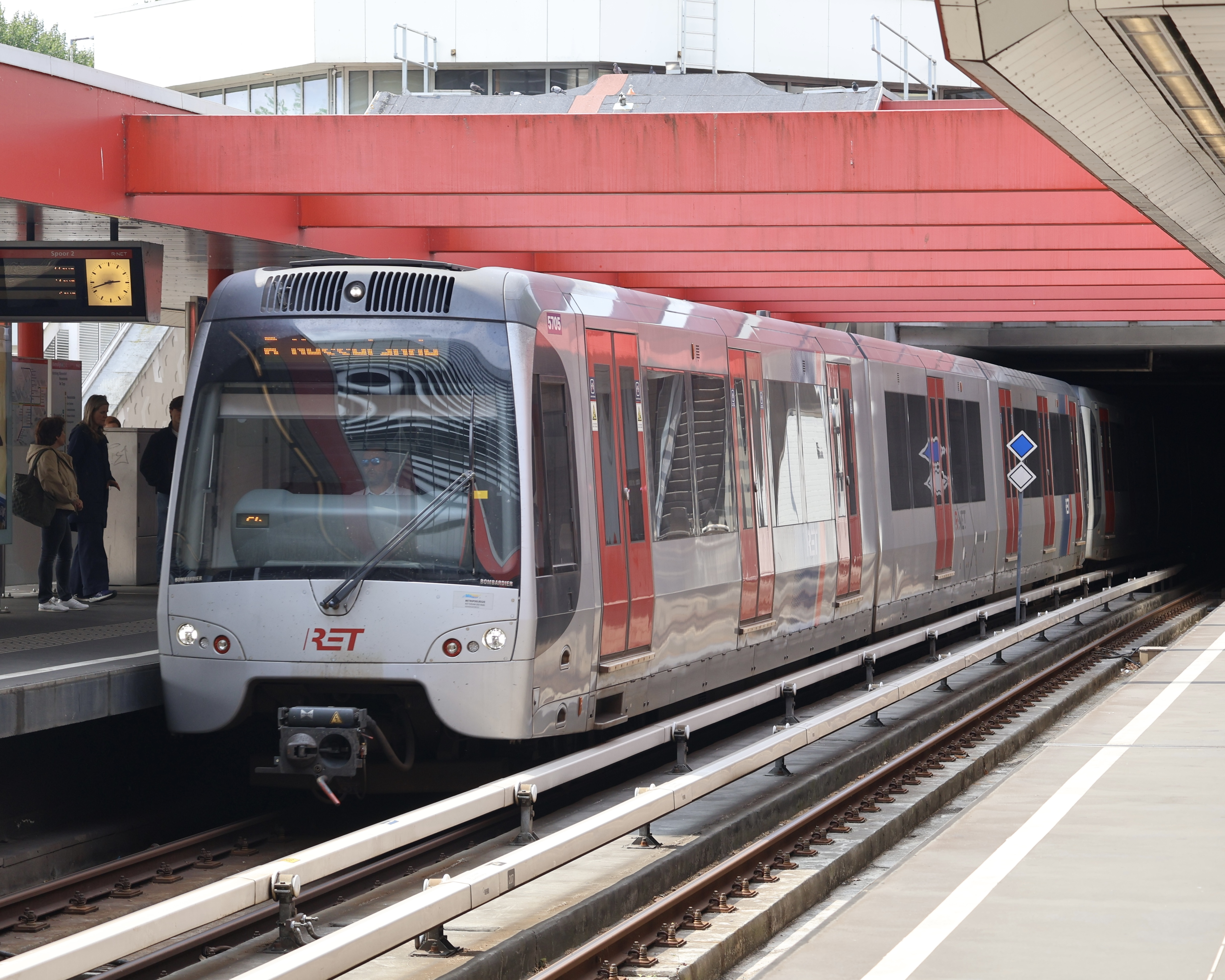
5700 series trainset at Kralingse Zoom

Metro Line B uses train units from the 5600 and 5700 series. The line typically operates with two coupled carriages of these series. In the evenings, single carriages from the 5600 and 5700 series are used; trains are decoupled in the evenings at Nesselande station. On Fridays (late-night shopping evening), coupled carriages continue to operate in the evening.

== Trivia ==
- The presence of rail transport reaching nearly onto the beach is not new in the Netherlands. In the past, the RTM ran through Oostvoorne, then turned right to reach very close to the beach. In 1921, a storm caused the tracks to end up literally on the beach, though they had already become unusable by then. The line was later rerouted to turn left after Oostvoorne, ending directly on the beach. This line, originating from Spijkenisse, opened in 1906 and was closed in 1965.
