= Verlaat =

Verlaat may refer to:

- Frank Verlaat (born 1968), Dutch footballer
- Woerdense Verlaat, town in South Holland
- Boterdorpse Verlaat, lock in Rotterdam
- Nieuw Verlaat, station of the Rotterdam Metro
- Berg en Broeksche Verlaat, canal lock in Rotterdam
