= List of metro systems in Europe =

List of rapid transit systems in Europe

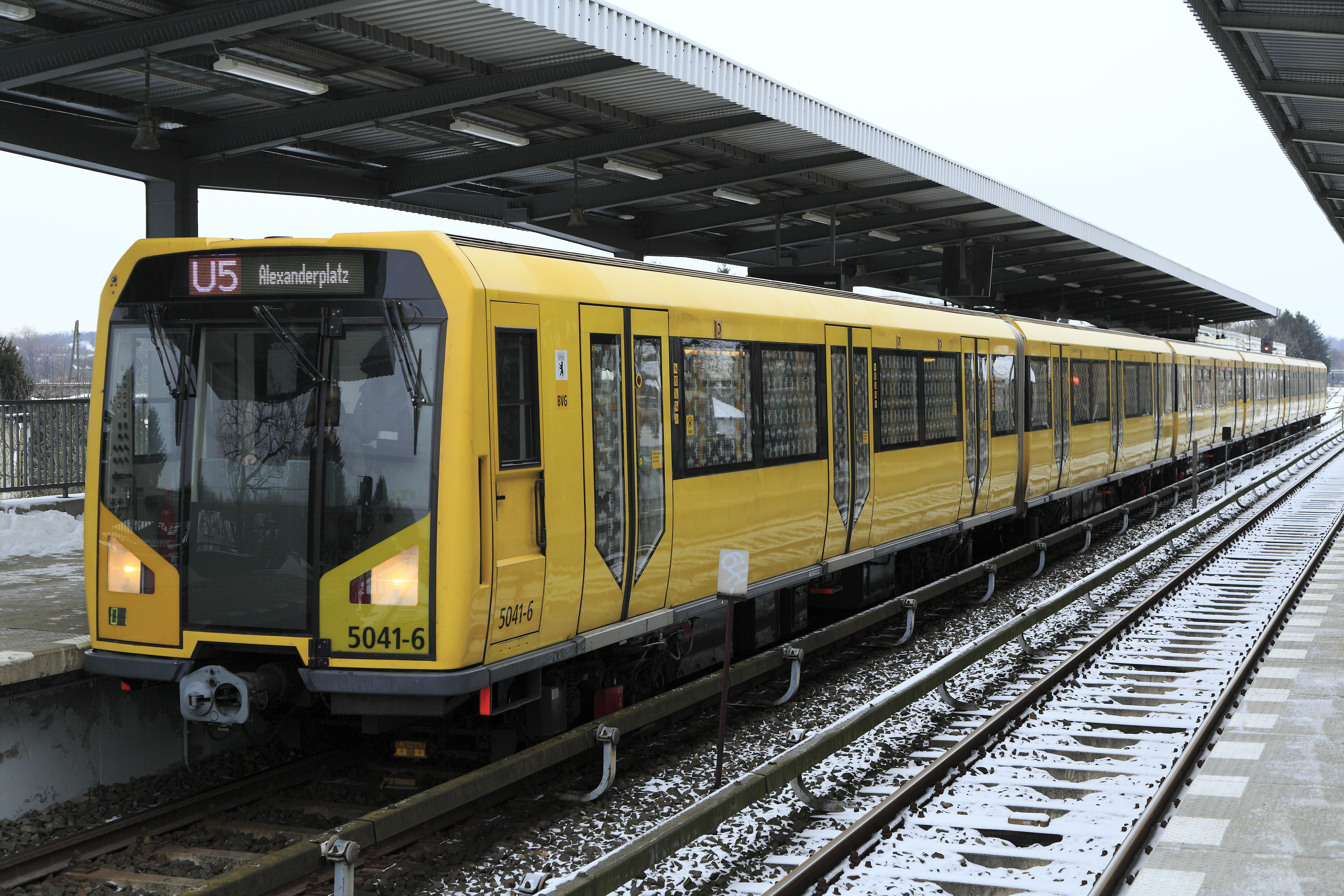
Class H of the Berlin U-Bahn

The following list of metro systems in Europe is ordered alphabetically by country and city. Although the term metro (or métro, metró, metrosu, metropoliteni, or metropolitano / metropolitana in Southern Europe, or mietrapaliten / metropoliten in Eastern Europe) is widespread in Europe, there are also other names for rapid transit systems, such as subway, underground, tube, T-bane, tunnelbana or U-Bahn. The list contains systems that can be defined as rapid transit with a completely segregated alignment, including light capacity metros, as well as light rail systems with a considerable section with a completely segregated alignment. Systems like these are grouped by Mark Ovenden as "Urban rail systems" in the 2007 version of the book Metro/Transit maps of the world.

== Armenia ==
System	Information		Currently operational	Currently under construction	Currently planned	Map	Ref.
Yerevan Metro Երևանի մետրոպոլիտեն	Locale	Yerevan	1				
Yerevan Metro Երևանի մետրոպոլիտեն	Began operation	7 March 1981	1				
Yerevan Metro Երևանի մետրոպոլիտեն	Lines in operation	1	1				
Yerevan Metro Երևանի մետրոպոլիտեն	No. of stations	10	1				
Yerevan Metro Երևանի մետրոպոլիտեն	Network length	13.4 km (8.3 mi)	1				
Yerevan Metro Երևանի մետրոպոլիտեն	Ridership	29.6 million (2023)	1				

== Austria ==
System	Information		Currently operational	Currently under construction	Currently planned	Map	Ref.
Vienna U-Bahn U-Bahn Wien	Locale	Vienna	U1 (Vienna U-Bahn) U2 (Vienna U-Bahn) U3 (Vienna U-Bahn) U4 (Vienna U-Bahn) U6 (Vienna U-Bahn)	(South extension)	(fork Rothneusiedl)		
Vienna U-Bahn U-Bahn Wien	Began operation	8 May 1976 (Note: Parts of the system opened in 1898 as part of the Vienna Stadtbahn)	U1 (Vienna U-Bahn) U2 (Vienna U-Bahn) U3 (Vienna U-Bahn) U4 (Vienna U-Bahn) U6 (Vienna U-Bahn)	(South extension)	(fork Rothneusiedl)		
Vienna U-Bahn U-Bahn Wien	Lines in operation	5	U1 (Vienna U-Bahn) U2 (Vienna U-Bahn) U3 (Vienna U-Bahn) U4 (Vienna U-Bahn) U6 (Vienna U-Bahn)	(South extension)	(fork Rothneusiedl)		
Vienna U-Bahn U-Bahn Wien	No. of stations	98	U1 (Vienna U-Bahn) U2 (Vienna U-Bahn) U3 (Vienna U-Bahn) U4 (Vienna U-Bahn) U6 (Vienna U-Bahn)	(South extension)	(fork Rothneusiedl)		
Vienna U-Bahn U-Bahn Wien	Network length	83.3 km (51.8 mi)	U1 (Vienna U-Bahn) U2 (Vienna U-Bahn) U3 (Vienna U-Bahn) U4 (Vienna U-Bahn) U6 (Vienna U-Bahn)	(South extension)	(fork Rothneusiedl)		
Vienna U-Bahn U-Bahn Wien	Ridership	459.8 million (2019)	U1 (Vienna U-Bahn) U2 (Vienna U-Bahn) U3 (Vienna U-Bahn) U4 (Vienna U-Bahn) U6 (Vienna U-Bahn)	(South extension)	(fork Rothneusiedl)		

The Tyrolean village of Serfaus also has a short metro, the U-Bahn Serfaus, which uses air cushions instead of rails.

== Azerbaijan ==
System	Information		Currently operational	Currently under construction	Currently planned	Map	Ref.
Baku Metro Bakı Metropoliteni	Locale	Baku	Red line Green line Purple line	Purple line (South extension)	Green line (West-East extension - Completion Loop); Blue Line; Yellow Line		
Baku Metro Bakı Metropoliteni	Began operation	9 November 1967	Red line Green line Purple line	Purple line (South extension)	Green line (West-East extension - Completion Loop); Blue Line; Yellow Line		
Baku Metro Bakı Metropoliteni	Lines in operation	3	Red line Green line Purple line	Purple line (South extension)	Green line (West-East extension - Completion Loop); Blue Line; Yellow Line		
Baku Metro Bakı Metropoliteni	No. of stations	27	Red line Green line Purple line	Purple line (South extension)	Green line (West-East extension - Completion Loop); Blue Line; Yellow Line		
Baku Metro Bakı Metropoliteni	Network length	40.7 km (25.3 mi)	Red line Green line Purple line	Purple line (South extension)	Green line (West-East extension - Completion Loop); Blue Line; Yellow Line		
Baku Metro Bakı Metropoliteni	Ridership	229.7 million (2019)	Red line Green line Purple line	Purple line (South extension)	Green line (West-East extension - Completion Loop); Blue Line; Yellow Line		

== Belarus ==
System	Information		Currently operational	Currently under construction	Currently planned	Map	Ref.
Minsk Metro Мінскі Mетрапалітэн	Locale	Minsk	Maskowskaya line Awtazavodskaya line Zelenaluzhskaya line	(North extension)			
Minsk Metro Мінскі Mетрапалітэн	Began operation	30 June 1984	Maskowskaya line Awtazavodskaya line Zelenaluzhskaya line	(North extension)			
Minsk Metro Мінскі Mетрапалітэн	Lines in operation	3	Maskowskaya line Awtazavodskaya line Zelenaluzhskaya line	(North extension)			
Minsk Metro Мінскі Mетрапалітэн	No. of stations	33	Maskowskaya line Awtazavodskaya line Zelenaluzhskaya line	(North extension)			
Minsk Metro Мінскі Mетрапалітэн	Network length	40.8 km (25.4 mi)	Maskowskaya line Awtazavodskaya line Zelenaluzhskaya line	(North extension)			
Minsk Metro Мінскі Mетрапалітэн	Ridership	226.3 million (2021)	Maskowskaya line Awtazavodskaya line Zelenaluzhskaya line	(North extension)			

== Belgium ==
System	Information		Currently operational	Currently under construction	Currently planned	Map	Ref.
Brussels Metro Métro de Bruxelles Brusselse Metro	Locale	Brussels	1 2 5 6	3			
Brussels Metro Métro de Bruxelles Brusselse Metro	Began operation	20 September 1976	1 2 5 6	3			
Brussels Metro Métro de Bruxelles Brusselse Metro	Lines in operation	4	1 2 5 6	3			
Brussels Metro Métro de Bruxelles Brusselse Metro	No. of stations	59	1 2 5 6	3			
Brussels Metro Métro de Bruxelles Brusselse Metro	Network length	39.9 km (24.8 mi)	1 2 5 6	3			
Brussels Metro Métro de Bruxelles Brusselse Metro	Ridership	87.6 million (2020)	1 2 5 6	3			
Charleroi Light rail (Note: the system is part-metro part-tramway. Only the metro sections are listed here) Métro Léger de Charleroi	Locale	Charleroi	M1 M2 M3 M4	M5			
Charleroi Light rail Métro Léger de Charleroi	Began operation	21 June 1976	M1 M2 M3 M4	M5			
Charleroi Light rail Métro Léger de Charleroi	Lines in operation	4	M1 M2 M3 M4	M5			
Charleroi Light rail Métro Léger de Charleroi	No. of stations	48	M1 M2 M3 M4	M5			
Charleroi Light rail Métro Léger de Charleroi	Network length	35.3 km (21.9 mi)	M1 M2 M3 M4	M5			
Charleroi Light rail Métro Léger de Charleroi	Ridership	5.6 million (2019)	M1 M2 M3 M4	M5			
Antwerp Pre-metro (Note: The system is a pre-metro tramway operating in underground tunnels within the city center.) Antwerpse premetro	Locale	Antwerp	2 3 5 6 8 9 10 15	Drink, Morckhoven, Stuivenberg, Willibrordus			
Antwerp Pre-metro Antwerpse premetro	Began operation	25 March 1975	2 3 5 6 8 9 10 15	Drink, Morckhoven, Stuivenberg, Willibrordus			
Antwerp Pre-metro Antwerpse premetro	Lines in operation	8	2 3 5 6 8 9 10 15	Drink, Morckhoven, Stuivenberg, Willibrordus			
Antwerp Pre-metro Antwerpse premetro	No. of stations	12	2 3 5 6 8 9 10 15	Drink, Morckhoven, Stuivenberg, Willibrordus			
Antwerp Pre-metro Antwerpse premetro	Network length	11.0 km (6.8 mi)	2 3 5 6 8 9 10 15	Drink, Morckhoven, Stuivenberg, Willibrordus			
Antwerp Pre-metro Antwerpse premetro	Ridership	24.0 million (2025)	2 3 5 6 8 9 10 15	Drink, Morckhoven, Stuivenberg, Willibrordus			

== Bulgaria ==
System	Information		Currently operational	Currently under construction	Currently planned	Map	Ref.
Sofia Metro Софийски Mетрополитен	Locale	Sofia	1 2 3 4	3 (North extension & branch)	1 (South extension); 2 (South extension & branch)		
Sofia Metro Софийски Mетрополитен	Began operation	28 January 1998	1 2 3 4	3 (North extension & branch)	1 (South extension); 2 (South extension & branch)		
Sofia Metro Софийски Mетрополитен	Lines in operation	4 (Note: 4 services)	1 2 3 4	3 (North extension & branch)	1 (South extension); 2 (South extension & branch)		
Sofia Metro Софийски Mетрополитен	No. of stations	47	1 2 3 4	3 (North extension & branch)	1 (South extension); 2 (South extension & branch)		
Sofia Metro Софийски Mетрополитен	Network length	52.0 km (32.3 mi)	1 2 3 4	3 (North extension & branch)	1 (South extension); 2 (South extension & branch)		
Sofia Metro Софийски Mетрополитен	Ridership	164.2 million (2023)	1 2 3 4	3 (North extension & branch)	1 (South extension); 2 (South extension & branch)		

== Czechia ==
System	Information		Currently operational	Currently under construction	Currently planned	Map	Ref.
Prague Metro Pražské Metro	Locale	Prague	A B C	D	D (North extension & branch)		
Prague Metro Pražské Metro	Began operation	9 May 1974	A B C	D	D (North extension & branch)		
Prague Metro Pražské Metro	Lines in operation	3	A B C	D	D (North extension & branch)		
Prague Metro Pražské Metro	No. of stations	58	A B C	D	D (North extension & branch)		
Prague Metro Pražské Metro	Network length	65.4 km (40.6 mi)	A B C	D	D (North extension & branch)		
Prague Metro Pražské Metro	Ridership	568 million (2021)	A B C	D	D (North extension & branch)		

== Denmark ==
System	Information		Currently operational	Currently under construction	Currently planned	Map	Ref.
Copenhagen Metro Københavns Metro	Locale	Copenhagen	M1 (Copenhagen) M2 (Copenhagen) City Circle Line M4 (Copenhagen)		(North extension)		
Copenhagen Metro Københavns Metro	Began operation	19 October 2002	M1 (Copenhagen) M2 (Copenhagen) City Circle Line M4 (Copenhagen)		(North extension)		
Copenhagen Metro Københavns Metro	Lines in operation	4	M1 (Copenhagen) M2 (Copenhagen) City Circle Line M4 (Copenhagen)		(North extension)		
Copenhagen Metro Københavns Metro	No. of stations	39	M1 (Copenhagen) M2 (Copenhagen) City Circle Line M4 (Copenhagen)		(North extension)		
Copenhagen Metro Københavns Metro	Network length	38.2 km (23.7 mi)	M1 (Copenhagen) M2 (Copenhagen) City Circle Line M4 (Copenhagen)		(North extension)		
Copenhagen Metro Københavns Metro	Ridership	119.7 million (2023)	M1 (Copenhagen) M2 (Copenhagen) City Circle Line M4 (Copenhagen)		(North extension)		

== Finland ==
System	Information		Currently operational	Currently under construction	Currently planned	Map	Ref.
Helsinki Metro Helsingin metro Helsingfors metro	Locale	Helsinki	M1 M2		M2 (East extension); M (Second Line)		
Helsinki Metro Helsingin metro Helsingfors metro	Began operation	2 August 1982	M1 M2		M2 (East extension); M (Second Line)		
Helsinki Metro Helsingin metro Helsingfors metro	Lines in operation	1 (Note: 2 routes)	M1 M2		M2 (East extension); M (Second Line)		
Helsinki Metro Helsingin metro Helsingfors metro	No. of stations	30	M1 M2		M2 (East extension); M (Second Line)		
Helsinki Metro Helsingin metro Helsingfors metro	Network length	43 km (26.7 mi)	M1 M2		M2 (East extension); M (Second Line)		
Helsinki Metro Helsingin metro Helsingfors metro	Ridership	79 million (2023)	M1 M2		M2 (East extension); M (Second Line)		

== France ==
System	Information		Currently operational	Currently under construction	Currently planned	Map	Ref.
Lille Metro Métro de Lille	Locale	Lille	Lille Metro		(South-West extension) (North-West extension)		
Lille Metro Métro de Lille	Began operation	25 April 1983	Lille Metro		(South-West extension) (North-West extension)		
Lille Metro Métro de Lille	Lines in operation	2	Lille Metro		(South-West extension) (North-West extension)		
Lille Metro Métro de Lille	No. of stations	60	Lille Metro		(South-West extension) (North-West extension)		
Lille Metro Métro de Lille	Network length	45.0 km (28.0 mi)	Lille Metro		(South-West extension) (North-West extension)		
Lille Metro Métro de Lille	Ridership	122.87 million (2023)	Lille Metro		(South-West extension) (North-West extension)		
Lyon Metro Métro de Lyon	Locale	Lyon	Lyon Metro Line A Lyon Metro Line B Lyon Metro Line C Lyon Metro Line D				
Lyon Metro Métro de Lyon	Began operation	9 December 1974	Lyon Metro Line A Lyon Metro Line B Lyon Metro Line C Lyon Metro Line D				
Lyon Metro Métro de Lyon	Lines in operation	4	Lyon Metro Line A Lyon Metro Line B Lyon Metro Line C Lyon Metro Line D				
Lyon Metro Métro de Lyon	No. of stations	42	Lyon Metro Line A Lyon Metro Line B Lyon Metro Line C Lyon Metro Line D				
Lyon Metro Métro de Lyon	Network length	34.4 km (21.4 mi)	Lyon Metro Line A Lyon Metro Line B Lyon Metro Line C Lyon Metro Line D				
Lyon Metro Métro de Lyon	Ridership	208.21 million (2023)	Lyon Metro Line A Lyon Metro Line B Lyon Metro Line C Lyon Metro Line D				
Marseille Metro Métro de Marseille	Locale	Marseille	Marseille Metro		(South-East extension)		
Marseille Metro Métro de Marseille	Began operation	26 November 1977	Marseille Metro		(South-East extension)		
Marseille Metro Métro de Marseille	Lines in operation	2	Marseille Metro		(South-East extension)		
Marseille Metro Métro de Marseille	No. of stations	31	Marseille Metro		(South-East extension)		
Marseille Metro Métro de Marseille	Network length	22.7 km (14.1 mi)	Marseille Metro		(South-East extension)		
Marseille Metro Métro de Marseille	Ridership	71.3 million (2023)	Marseille Metro		(South-East extension)		
Paris Métro Métro de Paris	Locale	Paris	Paris Metro Line 1 Paris Metro Line 2 Paris Metro Line 3 Paris Metro Line 3bis Paris Metro Line 4 Paris Metro Line 5 Paris Metro Line 6 Paris Metro Line 7 Paris Metro Line 7bis Paris Metro Line 8 Paris Metro Line 9 Paris Metro Line 10 Paris Metro Line 11 Paris Metro Line 12 Paris Metro Line 13 Paris Metro Line 14	Paris Metro Line 15 Paris Metro Line 16 Paris Metro Line 17 Paris Metro Line 18	(East extension) (West extension) (North & South extensions) (North extension) (East extension) (West & East extensions) (North & South extensions) (North extensions) (South extension) (North extension) (New line) (Merger)		
Paris Métro Métro de Paris	Began operation	19 July 1900	Paris Metro Line 1 Paris Metro Line 2 Paris Metro Line 3 Paris Metro Line 3bis Paris Metro Line 4 Paris Metro Line 5 Paris Metro Line 6 Paris Metro Line 7 Paris Metro Line 7bis Paris Metro Line 8 Paris Metro Line 9 Paris Metro Line 10 Paris Metro Line 11 Paris Metro Line 12 Paris Metro Line 13 Paris Metro Line 14	Paris Metro Line 15 Paris Metro Line 16 Paris Metro Line 17 Paris Metro Line 18	(East extension) (West extension) (North & South extensions) (North extension) (East extension) (West & East extensions) (North & South extensions) (North extensions) (South extension) (North extension) (New line) (Merger)		
Paris Métro Métro de Paris	Lines in operation	14 (Note: 16 routes)	Paris Metro Line 1 Paris Metro Line 2 Paris Metro Line 3 Paris Metro Line 3bis Paris Metro Line 4 Paris Metro Line 5 Paris Metro Line 6 Paris Metro Line 7 Paris Metro Line 7bis Paris Metro Line 8 Paris Metro Line 9 Paris Metro Line 10 Paris Metro Line 11 Paris Metro Line 12 Paris Metro Line 13 Paris Metro Line 14	Paris Metro Line 15 Paris Metro Line 16 Paris Metro Line 17 Paris Metro Line 18	(East extension) (West extension) (North & South extensions) (North extension) (East extension) (West & East extensions) (North & South extensions) (North extensions) (South extension) (North extension) (New line) (Merger)		
Paris Métro Métro de Paris	No. of stations	321	Paris Metro Line 1 Paris Metro Line 2 Paris Metro Line 3 Paris Metro Line 3bis Paris Metro Line 4 Paris Metro Line 5 Paris Metro Line 6 Paris Metro Line 7 Paris Metro Line 7bis Paris Metro Line 8 Paris Metro Line 9 Paris Metro Line 10 Paris Metro Line 11 Paris Metro Line 12 Paris Metro Line 13 Paris Metro Line 14	Paris Metro Line 15 Paris Metro Line 16 Paris Metro Line 17 Paris Metro Line 18	(East extension) (West extension) (North & South extensions) (North extension) (East extension) (West & East extensions) (North & South extensions) (North extensions) (South extension) (North extension) (New line) (Merger)		
Paris Métro Métro de Paris	Network length	245.6 km (152.6 mi)	Paris Metro Line 1 Paris Metro Line 2 Paris Metro Line 3 Paris Metro Line 3bis Paris Metro Line 4 Paris Metro Line 5 Paris Metro Line 6 Paris Metro Line 7 Paris Metro Line 7bis Paris Metro Line 8 Paris Metro Line 9 Paris Metro Line 10 Paris Metro Line 11 Paris Metro Line 12 Paris Metro Line 13 Paris Metro Line 14	Paris Metro Line 15 Paris Metro Line 16 Paris Metro Line 17 Paris Metro Line 18	(East extension) (West extension) (North & South extensions) (North extension) (East extension) (West & East extensions) (North & South extensions) (North extensions) (South extension) (North extension) (New line) (Merger)		
Paris Métro Métro de Paris	Ridership	1476 million (2024)	Paris Metro Line 1 Paris Metro Line 2 Paris Metro Line 3 Paris Metro Line 3bis Paris Metro Line 4 Paris Metro Line 5 Paris Metro Line 6 Paris Metro Line 7 Paris Metro Line 7bis Paris Metro Line 8 Paris Metro Line 9 Paris Metro Line 10 Paris Metro Line 11 Paris Metro Line 12 Paris Metro Line 13 Paris Metro Line 14	Paris Metro Line 15 Paris Metro Line 16 Paris Metro Line 17 Paris Metro Line 18	(East extension) (West extension) (North & South extensions) (North extension) (East extension) (West & East extensions) (North & South extensions) (North extensions) (South extension) (North extension) (New line) (Merger)		
Rennes Metro Métro de Rennes	Locale	Rennes	Rennes Metro				
Rennes Metro Métro de Rennes	Began operation	15 March 2002	Rennes Metro				
Rennes Metro Métro de Rennes	Lines in operation	2	Rennes Metro				
Rennes Metro Métro de Rennes	No. of stations	28	Rennes Metro				
Rennes Metro Métro de Rennes	Network length	22.4 km (13.9 mi)	Rennes Metro				
Rennes Metro Métro de Rennes	Ridership	59.4 million (2023)	Rennes Metro				
Toulouse Metro Métro de Toulouse	Locale	Toulouse	Toulouse Metro	(South extension)			
Toulouse Metro Métro de Toulouse	Began operation	26 June 1993	Toulouse Metro	(South extension)			
Toulouse Metro Métro de Toulouse	Lines in operation	2	Toulouse Metro	(South extension)			
Toulouse Metro Métro de Toulouse	No. of stations	38	Toulouse Metro	(South extension)			
Toulouse Metro Métro de Toulouse	Network length	28.2 km (17.5 mi)	Toulouse Metro	(South extension)			
Toulouse Metro Métro de Toulouse	Ridership	112.9 million (2023)	Toulouse Metro	(South extension)			

== Georgia ==
System	Information		Currently operational	Currently under construction	Currently planned	Map	Ref.
Tbilisi Metro თბილისის მეტროპოლიტენი	Locale	Tbilisi					
Tbilisi Metro თბილისის მეტროპოლიტენი	Began operation	11 January 1966					
Tbilisi Metro თბილისის მეტროპოლიტენი	Lines in operation	2					
Tbilisi Metro თბილისის მეტროპოლიტენი	No. of stations	23					
Tbilisi Metro თბილისის მეტროპოლიტენი	Network length	28.6 km (17.8 mi)					
Tbilisi Metro თბილისის მეტროპოლიტენი	Ridership	138.8 million (2019)					

== Germany ==
System	Information		Currently operational	Currently under construction	Currently planned	Map	Ref.
Berlin U-Bahn U-Bahn Berlin	Locale	Berlin	U1 U2 U3 U4 U5 U6 U7 U8 U9				
Berlin U-Bahn U-Bahn Berlin	Began operation	15 January 1902	U1 U2 U3 U4 U5 U6 U7 U8 U9				
Berlin U-Bahn U-Bahn Berlin	Lines in operation	8 (Note: 9 services)	U1 U2 U3 U4 U5 U6 U7 U8 U9				
Berlin U-Bahn U-Bahn Berlin	No. of stations	175	U1 U2 U3 U4 U5 U6 U7 U8 U9				
Berlin U-Bahn U-Bahn Berlin	Network length	155.4 km (96.6 mi)	U1 U2 U3 U4 U5 U6 U7 U8 U9				
Berlin U-Bahn U-Bahn Berlin	Ridership	596 million (2019)	U1 U2 U3 U4 U5 U6 U7 U8 U9				
Frankfurt U-Bahn U-Bahn Frankfurt	Locale	Frankfurt	U1 U2 U3 U4 U5 U6 U7 U8 U9				
Frankfurt U-Bahn U-Bahn Frankfurt	Began operation	4 October 1968	U1 U2 U3 U4 U5 U6 U7 U8 U9				
Frankfurt U-Bahn U-Bahn Frankfurt	Lines in operation	4 (Note: 9 services)	U1 U2 U3 U4 U5 U6 U7 U8 U9				
Frankfurt U-Bahn U-Bahn Frankfurt	No. of stations	86	U1 U2 U3 U4 U5 U6 U7 U8 U9				
Frankfurt U-Bahn U-Bahn Frankfurt	Network length	64.9 km (40.3 mi)	U1 U2 U3 U4 U5 U6 U7 U8 U9				
Frankfurt U-Bahn U-Bahn Frankfurt	Ridership	132.2 million (2016)	U1 U2 U3 U4 U5 U6 U7 U8 U9				
Hamburg U-Bahn U-Bahn Hamburg	Locale	Hamburg	U1 U2 U3 U4	East extension	South extension Phase II		
Hamburg U-Bahn U-Bahn Hamburg	Began operation	15 February 1912	U1 U2 U3 U4	East extension	South extension Phase II		
Hamburg U-Bahn U-Bahn Hamburg	Lines in operation	3 (Note: 4 services)	U1 U2 U3 U4	East extension	South extension Phase II		
Hamburg U-Bahn U-Bahn Hamburg	No. of stations	93	U1 U2 U3 U4	East extension	South extension Phase II		
Hamburg U-Bahn U-Bahn Hamburg	Network length	106.4 km (66.1 mi)	U1 U2 U3 U4	East extension	South extension Phase II		
Hamburg U-Bahn U-Bahn Hamburg	Ridership	249.5 million (2019)	U1 U2 U3 U4	East extension	South extension Phase II		
Munich U-Bahn U-Bahn München	Locale	Munich	Munich Metro	West extension	West extension		
Munich U-Bahn U-Bahn München	Began operation	19 October 1971	Munich Metro	West extension	West extension		
Munich U-Bahn U-Bahn München	Lines in operation	3 (Note: 8 services)	Munich Metro	West extension	West extension		
Munich U-Bahn U-Bahn München	No. of stations	96	Munich Metro	West extension	West extension		
Munich U-Bahn U-Bahn München	Network length	103.1 km (64.1 mi)	Munich Metro	West extension	West extension		
Munich U-Bahn U-Bahn München	Ridership	429 million (2019)	Munich Metro	West extension	West extension		
Nuremberg U-Bahn U-Bahn Nürnberg	Locale	Nuremberg	U1 U2 U3	South-West extension			
Nuremberg U-Bahn U-Bahn Nürnberg	Began operation	1 March 1972	U1 U2 U3	South-West extension			
Nuremberg U-Bahn U-Bahn Nürnberg	Lines in operation	2 (Note: 3 services)	U1 U2 U3	South-West extension			
Nuremberg U-Bahn U-Bahn Nürnberg	No. of stations	49	U1 U2 U3	South-West extension			
Nuremberg U-Bahn U-Bahn Nürnberg	Network length	38.2 km (23.7 mi)	U1 U2 U3	South-West extension			
Nuremberg U-Bahn U-Bahn Nürnberg	Ridership	114.6 million (2019)	U1 U2 U3	South-West extension			

== Greece ==
System	Information		Currently operational	Currently under construction	Currently planned	Map	Ref.
Athens Metro Μετρό Αθήνας	Locale	Athens	Athens Metro Line 1 Athens Metro Line 2 Athens Metro Line 3	Athens Metro Line 4	(North extension & branch) (North & South extensions); Phases II, III & branch		
Athens Metro Μετρό Αθήνας	Began operation	16 September 1904 (Note: Line 1 opened as a railway line in 1869)	Athens Metro Line 1 Athens Metro Line 2 Athens Metro Line 3	Athens Metro Line 4	(North extension & branch) (North & South extensions); Phases II, III & branch		
Athens Metro Μετρό Αθήνας	Lines in operation	3	Athens Metro Line 1 Athens Metro Line 2 Athens Metro Line 3	Athens Metro Line 4	(North extension & branch) (North & South extensions); Phases II, III & branch		
Athens Metro Μετρό Αθήνας	No. of stations	71 (Note: Another 4 stations are served via through operations of Line 3 on Proastiakos tracks to the Athens Airport)	Athens Metro Line 1 Athens Metro Line 2 Athens Metro Line 3	Athens Metro Line 4	(North extension & branch) (North & South extensions); Phases II, III & branch		
Athens Metro Μετρό Αθήνας	Network length	93.5 km (58.1 mi) (Note: Another 20.7km is served via through operations of Line 3 on Proastiakos tracks to the Athens Airport)	Athens Metro Line 1 Athens Metro Line 2 Athens Metro Line 3	Athens Metro Line 4	(North extension & branch) (North & South extensions); Phases II, III & branch		
Athens Metro Μετρό Αθήνας	Ridership	510 million (2024 - projected)	Athens Metro Line 1 Athens Metro Line 2 Athens Metro Line 3	Athens Metro Line 4	(North extension & branch) (North & South extensions); Phases II, III & branch		
Thessaloniki Metro Μετρό Θεσσαλονίκης	Locale	Thessaloniki	Thessaloniki Metro Line 1 Thessaloniki Metro Line 2		(West extension)		
Thessaloniki Metro Μετρό Θεσσαλονίκης	Began operation	30 November 2024	Thessaloniki Metro Line 1 Thessaloniki Metro Line 2		(West extension)		
Thessaloniki Metro Μετρό Θεσσαλονίκης	Lines in operation	2	Thessaloniki Metro Line 1 Thessaloniki Metro Line 2		(West extension)		
Thessaloniki Metro Μετρό Θεσσαλονίκης	No. of stations	18	Thessaloniki Metro Line 1 Thessaloniki Metro Line 2		(West extension)		
Thessaloniki Metro Μετρό Θεσσαλονίκης	Network length	14.28 km (8.9 mi)	Thessaloniki Metro Line 1 Thessaloniki Metro Line 2		(West extension)		
Thessaloniki Metro Μετρό Θεσσαλονίκης	Ridership	116.8 million (projected)	Thessaloniki Metro Line 1 Thessaloniki Metro Line 2		(West extension)		

== Hungary ==
System	Information		Currently operational	Currently under construction	Currently planned	Map	Ref.
Budapest Metro Budapesti Metró	Locale	Budapest	Line 1 (Budapest Metro) Line 2 (Budapest Metro) Line 3 (Budapest Metro) Line 4 (Budapest Metro)		HÉV		
Budapest Metro Budapesti Metró	Began operation	2 May 1896	Line 1 (Budapest Metro) Line 2 (Budapest Metro) Line 3 (Budapest Metro) Line 4 (Budapest Metro)		HÉV		
Budapest Metro Budapesti Metró	Lines in operation	4	Line 1 (Budapest Metro) Line 2 (Budapest Metro) Line 3 (Budapest Metro) Line 4 (Budapest Metro)		HÉV		
Budapest Metro Budapesti Metró	No. of stations	48	Line 1 (Budapest Metro) Line 2 (Budapest Metro) Line 3 (Budapest Metro) Line 4 (Budapest Metro)		HÉV		
Budapest Metro Budapesti Metró	Network length	39.7 km (24.7 mi)	Line 1 (Budapest Metro) Line 2 (Budapest Metro) Line 3 (Budapest Metro) Line 4 (Budapest Metro)		HÉV		
Budapest Metro Budapesti Metró	Ridership	382.6 million (2023)	Line 1 (Budapest Metro) Line 2 (Budapest Metro) Line 3 (Budapest Metro) Line 4 (Budapest Metro)		HÉV		

== Italy ==
System	Information		Currently operational	Currently under construction	Currently planned	Map	Ref.
Brescia Metro Metropolitana di Brescia	Locale	Brescia	1				
Brescia Metro Metropolitana di Brescia	Began operation	2 March 2013	1				
Brescia Metro Metropolitana di Brescia	Lines in operation	1	1				
Brescia Metro Metropolitana di Brescia	No. of stations	17	1				
Brescia Metro Metropolitana di Brescia	Network length	13.7 km (8.5 mi)	1				
Brescia Metro Metropolitana di Brescia	Ridership	18.7 million (2019)	1				
Catania Metro Metropolitana di Catania	Locale	Catania	1	1 North-West & South-West extensions			
Catania Metro Metropolitana di Catania	Began operation	27 June 1999	1	1 North-West & South-West extensions			
Catania Metro Metropolitana di Catania	Lines in operation	1	1	1 North-West & South-West extensions			
Catania Metro Metropolitana di Catania	No. of stations	10	1	1 North-West & South-West extensions			
Catania Metro Metropolitana di Catania	Network length	8.8 km (5.5 mi)	1	1 North-West & South-West extensions			
Catania Metro Metropolitana di Catania	Ridership	5.8 million (2018)	1	1 North-West & South-West extensions			
Genoa Metro Metropolitana di Genova	Locale	Genoa	1	1 West extension	1 East & West extensions		
Genoa Metro Metropolitana di Genova	Began operation	13 June 1990	1	1 West extension	1 East & West extensions		
Genoa Metro Metropolitana di Genova	Lines in operation	1	1	1 West extension	1 East & West extensions		
Genoa Metro Metropolitana di Genova	No. of stations	8	1	1 West extension	1 East & West extensions		
Genoa Metro Metropolitana di Genova	Network length	7.1 km (4.4 mi)	1	1 West extension	1 East & West extensions		
Genoa Metro Metropolitana di Genova	Ridership	5.8 million (2018)	1	1 West extension	1 East & West extensions		
Milan Metro Metropolitana di Milano	Locale	Milan	Milan Metro Line 1 Milan Metro Line 2 Milan Metro Line 3 Milan Metro Line 4 Milan Metro Line 5	North extension	West extension North & Branch extensions North & South extensions East Extension; North Extension		
Milan Metro Metropolitana di Milano	Began operation	1 November 1964	Milan Metro Line 1 Milan Metro Line 2 Milan Metro Line 3 Milan Metro Line 4 Milan Metro Line 5	North extension	West extension North & Branch extensions North & South extensions East Extension; North Extension		
Milan Metro Metropolitana di Milano	Lines in operation	5	Milan Metro Line 1 Milan Metro Line 2 Milan Metro Line 3 Milan Metro Line 4 Milan Metro Line 5	North extension	West extension North & Branch extensions North & South extensions East Extension; North Extension		
Milan Metro Metropolitana di Milano	No. of stations	125	Milan Metro Line 1 Milan Metro Line 2 Milan Metro Line 3 Milan Metro Line 4 Milan Metro Line 5	North extension	West extension North & Branch extensions North & South extensions East Extension; North Extension		
Milan Metro Metropolitana di Milano	Network length	111.8 km (69.5 mi)	Milan Metro Line 1 Milan Metro Line 2 Milan Metro Line 3 Milan Metro Line 4 Milan Metro Line 5	North extension	West extension North & Branch extensions North & South extensions East Extension; North Extension		
Milan Metro Metropolitana di Milano	Ridership	386.8 million (2019)	Milan Metro Line 1 Milan Metro Line 2 Milan Metro Line 3 Milan Metro Line 4 Milan Metro Line 5	North extension	West extension North & Branch extensions North & South extensions East Extension; North Extension		
Naples Metro Metropolitana di Napoli	Locale	Naples	Line 1 (Naples Metro) Line 6 (Naples Metro) Line 11 (Naples Metro)	Loop completion	West extension		
Naples Metro Metropolitana di Napoli	Began operation	28 March 1993	Line 1 (Naples Metro) Line 6 (Naples Metro) Line 11 (Naples Metro)	Loop completion	West extension		
Naples Metro Metropolitana di Napoli	Lines in operation	3	Line 1 (Naples Metro) Line 6 (Naples Metro) Line 11 (Naples Metro)	Loop completion	West extension		
Naples Metro Metropolitana di Napoli	No. of stations	30	Line 1 (Naples Metro) Line 6 (Naples Metro) Line 11 (Naples Metro)	Loop completion	West extension		
Naples Metro Metropolitana di Napoli	Network length	34.5 km (21.4 mi)	Line 1 (Naples Metro) Line 6 (Naples Metro) Line 11 (Naples Metro)	Loop completion	West extension		
Naples Metro Metropolitana di Napoli	Ridership	43.5 million (2019)	Line 1 (Naples Metro) Line 6 (Naples Metro) Line 11 (Naples Metro)	Loop completion	West extension		
Rome Metro Metropolitana di Roma	Locale	Rome	Line A (Rome Metro) Line B (Rome Metro) Line C (Rome Metro)	West extension	West extension North & Branch extensions West extensions		
Rome Metro Metropolitana di Roma	Began operation	9 February 1955	Line A (Rome Metro) Line B (Rome Metro) Line C (Rome Metro)	West extension	West extension North & Branch extensions West extensions		
Rome Metro Metropolitana di Roma	Lines in operation	3	Line A (Rome Metro) Line B (Rome Metro) Line C (Rome Metro)	West extension	West extension North & Branch extensions West extensions		
Rome Metro Metropolitana di Roma	No. of stations	74	Line A (Rome Metro) Line B (Rome Metro) Line C (Rome Metro)	West extension	West extension North & Branch extensions West extensions		
Rome Metro Metropolitana di Roma	Network length	62 km (38.5 mi)	Line A (Rome Metro) Line B (Rome Metro) Line C (Rome Metro)	West extension	West extension North & Branch extensions West extensions		
Rome Metro Metropolitana di Roma	Ridership	320 million (2018)	Line A (Rome Metro) Line B (Rome Metro) Line C (Rome Metro)	West extension	West extension North & Branch extensions West extensions		
Turin Metro Metropolitana di Torino	Locale	Turin	1	1 West extension	1 South extension 2		
Turin Metro Metropolitana di Torino	Began operation	4 February 2006	1	1 West extension	1 South extension 2		
Turin Metro Metropolitana di Torino	Lines in operation	1	1	1 West extension	1 South extension 2		
Turin Metro Metropolitana di Torino	No. of stations	23	1	1 West extension	1 South extension 2		
Turin Metro Metropolitana di Torino	Network length	15.1 km (9.4 mi)	1	1 West extension	1 South extension 2		
Turin Metro Metropolitana di Torino	Ridership	42.5 million (2018)	1	1 West extension	1 South extension 2		

== Netherlands ==
System	Information		Currently operational	Currently under construction	Currently planned	Map	Ref.
Amsterdam Metro Amsterdamse Metro	Locale	Amsterdam	50 51 52 53 54		52 (Schiphol extension)		
Amsterdam Metro Amsterdamse Metro	Began operation	14 October 1977	50 51 52 53 54		52 (Schiphol extension)		
Amsterdam Metro Amsterdamse Metro	Lines in operation	3 (Note: 5 services)	50 51 52 53 54		52 (Schiphol extension)		
Amsterdam Metro Amsterdamse Metro	No. of stations	39	50 51 52 53 54		52 (Schiphol extension)		
Amsterdam Metro Amsterdamse Metro	Network length	42.7 km (26.5 mi)	50 51 52 53 54		52 (Schiphol extension)		
Amsterdam Metro Amsterdamse Metro	Ridership	111.3 million (2019)	50 51 52 53 54		52 (Schiphol extension)		
Rotterdam Metro Rotterdamse Metro	Locale	Rotterdam	A B C D E				
Rotterdam Metro Rotterdamse Metro	Began operation	9 February 1968	A B C D E				
Rotterdam Metro Rotterdamse Metro	Lines in operation	2 (Note: 5 services)	A B C D E				
Rotterdam Metro Rotterdamse Metro	No. of stations	70	A B C D E				
Rotterdam Metro Rotterdamse Metro	Network length	100.6 km (62.5 mi)	A B C D E				
Rotterdam Metro Rotterdamse Metro	Ridership	99 million (2019)	A B C D E				

== Norway ==
System	Information		Currently operational	Currently under construction	Currently planned	Map	Ref.
Oslo Metro Oslo T-Bane	Locale	Oslo	Oslo Metro	Fornebu Line			
Oslo Metro Oslo T-Bane	Began operation	22 May 1966	Oslo Metro	Fornebu Line			
Oslo Metro Oslo T-Bane	Lines in operation	3 (Note: 5 services)	Oslo Metro	Fornebu Line			
Oslo Metro Oslo T-Bane	No. of stations	101	Oslo Metro	Fornebu Line			
Oslo Metro Oslo T-Bane	Network length	85.0 km (52.8 mi)	Oslo Metro	Fornebu Line			
Oslo Metro Oslo T-Bane	Ridership	116 million (2024)	Oslo Metro	Fornebu Line			

== Poland ==
System	Information		Currently operational	Currently under construction	Currently planned	Map	Ref.
Warsaw Metro Metro Warszawskie	Locale	Warsaw	Line M1 Line M2	West extension	Branch		
Warsaw Metro Metro Warszawskie	Began operation	7 April 1995	Line M1 Line M2	West extension	Branch		
Warsaw Metro Metro Warszawskie	Lines in operation	2	Line M1 Line M2	West extension	Branch		
Warsaw Metro Metro Warszawskie	No. of stations	39	Line M1 Line M2	West extension	Branch		
Warsaw Metro Metro Warszawskie	Network length	41.3 km (25.7 mi)	Line M1 Line M2	West extension	Branch		
Warsaw Metro Metro Warszawskie	Ridership	195.4 million (2019)	Line M1 Line M2	West extension	Branch		

== Portugal ==
System	Information		Currently operational	Currently under construction	Currently planned	Map	Ref.
Lisbon Metro Metropolitano de Lisboa	Locale	Lisbon	Blue Line (Lisbon Metro) Yellow Line (Lisbon Metro) Green Line (Lisbon Metro) Red Line (Lisbon Metro)	South extension	South-West extension		
Lisbon Metro Metropolitano de Lisboa	Began operation	29 December 1959	Blue Line (Lisbon Metro) Yellow Line (Lisbon Metro) Green Line (Lisbon Metro) Red Line (Lisbon Metro)	South extension	South-West extension		
Lisbon Metro Metropolitano de Lisboa	Lines in operation	4	Blue Line (Lisbon Metro) Yellow Line (Lisbon Metro) Green Line (Lisbon Metro) Red Line (Lisbon Metro)	South extension	South-West extension		
Lisbon Metro Metropolitano de Lisboa	No. of stations	56	Blue Line (Lisbon Metro) Yellow Line (Lisbon Metro) Green Line (Lisbon Metro) Red Line (Lisbon Metro)	South extension	South-West extension		
Lisbon Metro Metropolitano de Lisboa	Network length	44.5 km (27.7 mi)	Blue Line (Lisbon Metro) Yellow Line (Lisbon Metro) Green Line (Lisbon Metro) Red Line (Lisbon Metro)	South extension	South-West extension		
Lisbon Metro Metropolitano de Lisboa	Ridership	184.6 million (2019)	Blue Line (Lisbon Metro) Yellow Line (Lisbon Metro) Green Line (Lisbon Metro) Red Line (Lisbon Metro)	South extension	South-West extension		
Porto Metro (Note: The Porto Metro is actually a light rail system. Only grade-separated metro-like sections are listed here) Metro do Porto	Locale	Porto	Porto Metro	Porto Metro	(Ismai - Muro - Trofa)		
Porto Metro Metro do Porto	Began operation	7 December 2002	Porto Metro	Porto Metro	(Ismai - Muro - Trofa)		
Porto Metro Metro do Porto	Lines in operation	2 (Note: 6 routes, all of which use a part of the grade-separated section)	Porto Metro	Porto Metro	(Ismai - Muro - Trofa)		
Porto Metro Metro do Porto	No. of stations	85	Porto Metro	Porto Metro	(Ismai - Muro - Trofa)		
Porto Metro Metro do Porto	Network length	70.1 km (43.6 mi)	Porto Metro	Porto Metro	(Ismai - Muro - Trofa)		
Porto Metro Metro do Porto	Ridership	89.8 million (2024) (Note: Figures account for the full system)	Porto Metro	Porto Metro	(Ismai - Muro - Trofa)		

== Romania ==
System	Information		Currently operational	Currently under construction	Currently planned	Map	Ref.
Bucharest Metro Metroul din București	Locale	Bucharest	M1 M2 M3 M4 M5	M6	M2 North extension M4 South extension M5 East extension		
Bucharest Metro Metroul din București	Began operation	16 November 1979	M1 M2 M3 M4 M5	M6	M2 North extension M4 South extension M5 East extension		
Bucharest Metro Metroul din București	Lines in operation	5 (Note: 5 routes)	M1 M2 M3 M4 M5	M6	M2 North extension M4 South extension M5 East extension		
Bucharest Metro Metroul din București	No. of stations	64	M1 M2 M3 M4 M5	M6	M2 North extension M4 South extension M5 East extension		
Bucharest Metro Metroul din București	Network length	79.36 km (49.3 mi)	M1 M2 M3 M4 M5	M6	M2 North extension M4 South extension M5 East extension		
Bucharest Metro Metroul din București	Ridership	179.2 million (2019)	M1 M2 M3 M4 M5	M6	M2 North extension M4 South extension M5 East extension		

== Russia ==
System	Information		Currently operational	Currently under construction	Currently planned	Map	Ref.
Kazan Metro Казанский метрополитен Казан метросы	Locale	Kazan	1	2	1 North & South extensions 2 North extension 3; 4		
Kazan Metro Казанский метрополитен Казан метросы	Began operation	27 August 2005	1	2	1 North & South extensions 2 North extension 3; 4		
Kazan Metro Казанский метрополитен Казан метросы	Lines in operation	1	1	2	1 North & South extensions 2 North extension 3; 4		
Kazan Metro Казанский метрополитен Казан метросы	No. of stations	11	1	2	1 North & South extensions 2 North extension 3; 4		
Kazan Metro Казанский метрополитен Казан метросы	Network length	16.8 km (10.4 mi)	1	2	1 North & South extensions 2 North extension 3; 4		
Kazan Metro Казанский метрополитен Казан метросы	Ridership	21.5 million (2019)	1	2	1 North & South extensions 2 North extension 3; 4		
Moscow Metro Московский метрополитен	Locale	Moscow	#1 Sokolnicheskaya line #2 Zamoskvoretskaya line #3 Arbatsko-Pokrovskaya line #4 Filyovskaya line #5 Koltsevaya line #6 Kaluzhsko-Rizhskaya line #7 Tagansko-Krasnopresnenskaya line #8 Kalininskaya line #8A Solntsevskaya line #9 Serpukhovsko-Timiryazevskaya line #10 Lyublinsko-Dmitrovskaya line #11 Bolshaya Koltsevaya line #12 Butovskaya line #14 Moscow Central Circle #15 Nekrasovskaya line #16 Troitskaya line #17 Rublyovo-Arkhangelskaya line	East extension South extension First section	Northeast extension West extension Northeast extension Northwest extension Central section East extension Northwest extension South extension		
Moscow Metro Московский метрополитен	Began operation	15 May 1935	#1 Sokolnicheskaya line #2 Zamoskvoretskaya line #3 Arbatsko-Pokrovskaya line #4 Filyovskaya line #5 Koltsevaya line #6 Kaluzhsko-Rizhskaya line #7 Tagansko-Krasnopresnenskaya line #8 Kalininskaya line #8A Solntsevskaya line #9 Serpukhovsko-Timiryazevskaya line #10 Lyublinsko-Dmitrovskaya line #11 Bolshaya Koltsevaya line #12 Butovskaya line #14 Moscow Central Circle #15 Nekrasovskaya line #16 Troitskaya line #17 Rublyovo-Arkhangelskaya line	East extension South extension First section	Northeast extension West extension Northeast extension Northwest extension Central section East extension Northwest extension South extension		
Moscow Metro Московский метрополитен	Lines in operation	17	#1 Sokolnicheskaya line #2 Zamoskvoretskaya line #3 Arbatsko-Pokrovskaya line #4 Filyovskaya line #5 Koltsevaya line #6 Kaluzhsko-Rizhskaya line #7 Tagansko-Krasnopresnenskaya line #8 Kalininskaya line #8A Solntsevskaya line #9 Serpukhovsko-Timiryazevskaya line #10 Lyublinsko-Dmitrovskaya line #11 Bolshaya Koltsevaya line #12 Butovskaya line #14 Moscow Central Circle #15 Nekrasovskaya line #16 Troitskaya line #17 Rublyovo-Arkhangelskaya line	East extension South extension First section	Northeast extension West extension Northeast extension Northwest extension Central section East extension Northwest extension South extension		
Moscow Metro Московский метрополитен	No. of stations	309	#1 Sokolnicheskaya line #2 Zamoskvoretskaya line #3 Arbatsko-Pokrovskaya line #4 Filyovskaya line #5 Koltsevaya line #6 Kaluzhsko-Rizhskaya line #7 Tagansko-Krasnopresnenskaya line #8 Kalininskaya line #8A Solntsevskaya line #9 Serpukhovsko-Timiryazevskaya line #10 Lyublinsko-Dmitrovskaya line #11 Bolshaya Koltsevaya line #12 Butovskaya line #14 Moscow Central Circle #15 Nekrasovskaya line #16 Troitskaya line #17 Rublyovo-Arkhangelskaya line	East extension South extension First section	Northeast extension West extension Northeast extension Northwest extension Central section East extension Northwest extension South extension		
Moscow Metro Московский метрополитен	Network length	541.9 km (336.7 mi)	#1 Sokolnicheskaya line #2 Zamoskvoretskaya line #3 Arbatsko-Pokrovskaya line #4 Filyovskaya line #5 Koltsevaya line #6 Kaluzhsko-Rizhskaya line #7 Tagansko-Krasnopresnenskaya line #8 Kalininskaya line #8A Solntsevskaya line #9 Serpukhovsko-Timiryazevskaya line #10 Lyublinsko-Dmitrovskaya line #11 Bolshaya Koltsevaya line #12 Butovskaya line #14 Moscow Central Circle #15 Nekrasovskaya line #16 Troitskaya line #17 Rublyovo-Arkhangelskaya line	East extension South extension First section	Northeast extension West extension Northeast extension Northwest extension Central section East extension Northwest extension South extension		
Moscow Metro Московский метрополитен	Ridership	2257.7 million (2024)	#1 Sokolnicheskaya line #2 Zamoskvoretskaya line #3 Arbatsko-Pokrovskaya line #4 Filyovskaya line #5 Koltsevaya line #6 Kaluzhsko-Rizhskaya line #7 Tagansko-Krasnopresnenskaya line #8 Kalininskaya line #8A Solntsevskaya line #9 Serpukhovsko-Timiryazevskaya line #10 Lyublinsko-Dmitrovskaya line #11 Bolshaya Koltsevaya line #12 Butovskaya line #14 Moscow Central Circle #15 Nekrasovskaya line #16 Troitskaya line #17 Rublyovo-Arkhangelskaya line	East extension South extension First section	Northeast extension West extension Northeast extension Northwest extension Central section East extension Northwest extension South extension		
Nizhny Novgorod Metro Нижегородское метро	Locale	Nizhny Novgorod	Avtozavodskaya Line (1) Sormovskaya Line (2)	East extension	South extension West and North-West extensions		
Nizhny Novgorod Metro Нижегородское метро	Began operation	20 November 1985	Avtozavodskaya Line (1) Sormovskaya Line (2)	East extension	South extension West and North-West extensions		
Nizhny Novgorod Metro Нижегородское метро	Lines in operation	2	Avtozavodskaya Line (1) Sormovskaya Line (2)	East extension	South extension West and North-West extensions		
Nizhny Novgorod Metro Нижегородское метро	No. of stations	15	Avtozavodskaya Line (1) Sormovskaya Line (2)	East extension	South extension West and North-West extensions		
Nizhny Novgorod Metro Нижегородское метро	Network length	21.6 km (13.4 mi)	Avtozavodskaya Line (1) Sormovskaya Line (2)	East extension	South extension West and North-West extensions		
Nizhny Novgorod Metro Нижегородское метро	Ridership	20.4 million (2020)	Avtozavodskaya Line (1) Sormovskaya Line (2)	East extension	South extension West and North-West extensions		
Saint Petersburg Metro Петербургский метрополитен	Locale	Saint Petersburg	Line 1 (Saint Petersburg Metro) Line 2 (Saint Petersburg Metro) Line 3 (Saint Petersburg Metro) Line 4 (Saint Petersburg Metro) Line 5 (Saint Petersburg Metro)	West extension	North extension West & South extensions North section		
Saint Petersburg Metro Петербургский метрополитен	Began operation	15 November 1955	Line 1 (Saint Petersburg Metro) Line 2 (Saint Petersburg Metro) Line 3 (Saint Petersburg Metro) Line 4 (Saint Petersburg Metro) Line 5 (Saint Petersburg Metro)	West extension	North extension West & South extensions North section		
Saint Petersburg Metro Петербургский метрополитен	Lines in operation	5	Line 1 (Saint Petersburg Metro) Line 2 (Saint Petersburg Metro) Line 3 (Saint Petersburg Metro) Line 4 (Saint Petersburg Metro) Line 5 (Saint Petersburg Metro)	West extension	North extension West & South extensions North section		
Saint Petersburg Metro Петербургский метрополитен	No. of stations	64	Line 1 (Saint Petersburg Metro) Line 2 (Saint Petersburg Metro) Line 3 (Saint Petersburg Metro) Line 4 (Saint Petersburg Metro) Line 5 (Saint Petersburg Metro)	West extension	North extension West & South extensions North section		
Saint Petersburg Metro Петербургский метрополитен	Network length	124.8 km (77.5 mi)	Line 1 (Saint Petersburg Metro) Line 2 (Saint Petersburg Metro) Line 3 (Saint Petersburg Metro) Line 4 (Saint Petersburg Metro) Line 5 (Saint Petersburg Metro)	West extension	North extension West & South extensions North section		
Saint Petersburg Metro Петербургский метрополитен	Ridership	495 million (2020)	Line 1 (Saint Petersburg Metro) Line 2 (Saint Petersburg Metro) Line 3 (Saint Petersburg Metro) Line 4 (Saint Petersburg Metro) Line 5 (Saint Petersburg Metro)	West extension	North extension West & South extensions North section		
Samara Metro Самарское метро	Locale	Samara	1		1 West extension & Branch; 2; 3		
Samara Metro Самарское метро	Began operation	27 August 2005	1		1 West extension & Branch; 2; 3		
Samara Metro Самарское метро	Lines in operation	1	1		1 West extension & Branch; 2; 3		
Samara Metro Самарское метро	No. of stations	10	1		1 West extension & Branch; 2; 3		
Samara Metro Самарское метро	Network length	12.7 km (7.9 mi)	1		1 West extension & Branch; 2; 3		
Samara Metro Самарское метро	Ridership	8.8 million (2020)	1		1 West extension & Branch; 2; 3		

== Spain ==
System	Information		Currently operational	Currently under construction	Currently planned	Map	Ref.
Barcelona Metro Metro de Barcelona	Locale	Barcelona	Barcelona Metro line 1 Barcelona Metro line 2 Barcelona Metro line 3 Barcelona Metro line 4 Barcelona Metro line 5 Barcelona Metro line 6 Barcelona Metro line 7 Barcelona Metro line 8 Barcelona Metro line 9 Barcelona Metro line 10 Barcelona Metro line 11 Barcelona Metro line 12	Central section	East & West extensions West extension East & West extensions Sagrera extension East extension South extension West extension		
Barcelona Metro Metro de Barcelona	Began operation	30 December 1924	Barcelona Metro line 1 Barcelona Metro line 2 Barcelona Metro line 3 Barcelona Metro line 4 Barcelona Metro line 5 Barcelona Metro line 6 Barcelona Metro line 7 Barcelona Metro line 8 Barcelona Metro line 9 Barcelona Metro line 10 Barcelona Metro line 11 Barcelona Metro line 12	Central section	East & West extensions West extension East & West extensions Sagrera extension East extension South extension West extension		
Barcelona Metro Metro de Barcelona	Lines in operation	9 (Note: 12 routes)	Barcelona Metro line 1 Barcelona Metro line 2 Barcelona Metro line 3 Barcelona Metro line 4 Barcelona Metro line 5 Barcelona Metro line 6 Barcelona Metro line 7 Barcelona Metro line 8 Barcelona Metro line 9 Barcelona Metro line 10 Barcelona Metro line 11 Barcelona Metro line 12	Central section	East & West extensions West extension East & West extensions Sagrera extension East extension South extension West extension		
Barcelona Metro Metro de Barcelona	No. of stations	166	Barcelona Metro line 1 Barcelona Metro line 2 Barcelona Metro line 3 Barcelona Metro line 4 Barcelona Metro line 5 Barcelona Metro line 6 Barcelona Metro line 7 Barcelona Metro line 8 Barcelona Metro line 9 Barcelona Metro line 10 Barcelona Metro line 11 Barcelona Metro line 12	Central section	East & West extensions West extension East & West extensions Sagrera extension East extension South extension West extension		
Barcelona Metro Metro de Barcelona	Network length	147.2 km (91.5 mi)	Barcelona Metro line 1 Barcelona Metro line 2 Barcelona Metro line 3 Barcelona Metro line 4 Barcelona Metro line 5 Barcelona Metro line 6 Barcelona Metro line 7 Barcelona Metro line 8 Barcelona Metro line 9 Barcelona Metro line 10 Barcelona Metro line 11 Barcelona Metro line 12	Central section	East & West extensions West extension East & West extensions Sagrera extension East extension South extension West extension		
Barcelona Metro Metro de Barcelona	Ridership	440 million (2023)	Barcelona Metro line 1 Barcelona Metro line 2 Barcelona Metro line 3 Barcelona Metro line 4 Barcelona Metro line 5 Barcelona Metro line 6 Barcelona Metro line 7 Barcelona Metro line 8 Barcelona Metro line 9 Barcelona Metro line 10 Barcelona Metro line 11 Barcelona Metro line 12	Central section	East & West extensions West extension East & West extensions Sagrera extension East extension South extension West extension		
Bilbao Metro Metro de Bilbao Bilboko metroa	Locale	Bilbao	Line 1 (Bilbao Metro) Line 2 (Bilbao Metro) Line 3 (Bilbao Metro)		East & West extensions		
Bilbao Metro Metro de Bilbao Bilboko metroa	Began operation	11 November 1995	Line 1 (Bilbao Metro) Line 2 (Bilbao Metro) Line 3 (Bilbao Metro)		East & West extensions		
Bilbao Metro Metro de Bilbao Bilboko metroa	Lines in operation	2 (Note: 3 routes)	Line 1 (Bilbao Metro) Line 2 (Bilbao Metro) Line 3 (Bilbao Metro)		East & West extensions		
Bilbao Metro Metro de Bilbao Bilboko metroa	No. of stations	48	Line 1 (Bilbao Metro) Line 2 (Bilbao Metro) Line 3 (Bilbao Metro)		East & West extensions		
Bilbao Metro Metro de Bilbao Bilboko metroa	Network length	51.0 km (31.7 mi)	Line 1 (Bilbao Metro) Line 2 (Bilbao Metro) Line 3 (Bilbao Metro)		East & West extensions		
Bilbao Metro Metro de Bilbao Bilboko metroa	Ridership	92.3 million (2023)	Line 1 (Bilbao Metro) Line 2 (Bilbao Metro) Line 3 (Bilbao Metro)		East & West extensions		
Granada Metro Metro de Granada	Locale	Granada	Granada Metro	South extension	North extension North & Center extension		
Granada Metro Metro de Granada	Began operation	21 September 2017	Granada Metro	South extension	North extension North & Center extension		
Granada Metro Metro de Granada	Lines in operation	1	Granada Metro	South extension	North extension North & Center extension		
Granada Metro Metro de Granada	No. of stations	33	Granada Metro	South extension	North extension North & Center extension		
Granada Metro Metro de Granada	Network length	20.5 km (12.7 mi)	Granada Metro	South extension	North extension North & Center extension		
Granada Metro Metro de Granada	Ridership	16.2 million (2024)	Granada Metro	South extension	North extension North & Center extension		
Madrid Metro Metro de Madrid	Locale	Madrid	Line 1 (Madrid Metro) Line 2 (Madrid Metro) Line 3 (Madrid Metro) Line 4 (Madrid Metro) Line 5 (Madrid Metro) Line 6 (Madrid Metro) Line 7 (Madrid Metro) Line 8 (Madrid Metro) Line 9 (Madrid Metro) Line 10 (Madrid Metro) Line 11 (Madrid Metro) Line 12 (Madrid Metro)	South extension North-West extension	North extension North & West extensions		
Madrid Metro Metro de Madrid	Began operation	30 December 1924	Line 1 (Madrid Metro) Line 2 (Madrid Metro) Line 3 (Madrid Metro) Line 4 (Madrid Metro) Line 5 (Madrid Metro) Line 6 (Madrid Metro) Line 7 (Madrid Metro) Line 8 (Madrid Metro) Line 9 (Madrid Metro) Line 10 (Madrid Metro) Line 11 (Madrid Metro) Line 12 (Madrid Metro)	South extension North-West extension	North extension North & West extensions		
Madrid Metro Metro de Madrid	Lines in operation	12	Line 1 (Madrid Metro) Line 2 (Madrid Metro) Line 3 (Madrid Metro) Line 4 (Madrid Metro) Line 5 (Madrid Metro) Line 6 (Madrid Metro) Line 7 (Madrid Metro) Line 8 (Madrid Metro) Line 9 (Madrid Metro) Line 10 (Madrid Metro) Line 11 (Madrid Metro) Line 12 (Madrid Metro)	South extension North-West extension	North extension North & West extensions		
Madrid Metro Metro de Madrid	No. of stations	242	Line 1 (Madrid Metro) Line 2 (Madrid Metro) Line 3 (Madrid Metro) Line 4 (Madrid Metro) Line 5 (Madrid Metro) Line 6 (Madrid Metro) Line 7 (Madrid Metro) Line 8 (Madrid Metro) Line 9 (Madrid Metro) Line 10 (Madrid Metro) Line 11 (Madrid Metro) Line 12 (Madrid Metro)	South extension North-West extension	North extension North & West extensions		
Madrid Metro Metro de Madrid	Network length	288.5 km (179.3 mi)	Line 1 (Madrid Metro) Line 2 (Madrid Metro) Line 3 (Madrid Metro) Line 4 (Madrid Metro) Line 5 (Madrid Metro) Line 6 (Madrid Metro) Line 7 (Madrid Metro) Line 8 (Madrid Metro) Line 9 (Madrid Metro) Line 10 (Madrid Metro) Line 11 (Madrid Metro) Line 12 (Madrid Metro)	South extension North-West extension	North extension North & West extensions		
Madrid Metro Metro de Madrid	Ridership	662 million (2023)	Line 1 (Madrid Metro) Line 2 (Madrid Metro) Line 3 (Madrid Metro) Line 4 (Madrid Metro) Line 5 (Madrid Metro) Line 6 (Madrid Metro) Line 7 (Madrid Metro) Line 8 (Madrid Metro) Line 9 (Madrid Metro) Line 10 (Madrid Metro) Line 11 (Madrid Metro) Line 12 (Madrid Metro)	South extension North-West extension	North extension North & West extensions		
Palma Metro Metro de Palma	Locale	Palma de Mallorca	Palma Metro				
Palma Metro Metro de Palma	Began operation	25 April 2007	Palma Metro				
Palma Metro Metro de Palma	Lines in operation	2	Palma Metro				
Palma Metro Metro de Palma	No. of stations	16	Palma Metro				
Palma Metro Metro de Palma	Network length	15.6 km (9.7 mi)	Palma Metro				
Palma Metro Metro de Palma	Ridership	2.4 million (2016)	Palma Metro				
Málaga Metro (Note: Part of the system functions as at-grade light rail. Only underground sections are taken into account here) Metro de Málaga	Locale	Málaga	Málaga Metro	East extension	North extension		
Málaga Metro Metro de Málaga	Began operation	30 July 2014	Málaga Metro	East extension	North extension		
Málaga Metro Metro de Málaga	Lines in operation	2	Málaga Metro	East extension	North extension		
Málaga Metro Metro de Málaga	No. of stations	12	Málaga Metro	East extension	North extension		
Málaga Metro Metro de Málaga	Network length	8.5 km (5.3 mi)	Málaga Metro	East extension	North extension		
Málaga Metro Metro de Málaga	Ridership	13 million (2023) (Note: The figures are for the whole system, including the at-grade section)	Málaga Metro	East extension	North extension		
Seville Metro Metro de Sevilla	Locale	Seville	Line 1 (Seville Metro)		Line 2 (Seville metro) Line 3 (Seville metro) Line 4 (Seville metro)		
Seville Metro Metro de Sevilla	Began operation	2 April 2009	Line 1 (Seville Metro)		Line 2 (Seville metro) Line 3 (Seville metro) Line 4 (Seville metro)		
Seville Metro Metro de Sevilla	Lines in operation	1	Line 1 (Seville Metro)		Line 2 (Seville metro) Line 3 (Seville metro) Line 4 (Seville metro)		
Seville Metro Metro de Sevilla	No. of stations	22	Line 1 (Seville Metro)		Line 2 (Seville metro) Line 3 (Seville metro) Line 4 (Seville metro)		
Seville Metro Metro de Sevilla	Network length	18.0 km (11.2 mi)	Line 1 (Seville Metro)		Line 2 (Seville metro) Line 3 (Seville metro) Line 4 (Seville metro)		
Seville Metro Metro de Sevilla	Ridership	20.4 million (2023)	Line 1 (Seville Metro)		Line 2 (Seville metro) Line 3 (Seville metro) Line 4 (Seville metro)		
Metrovalencia (Note: The system is a mix of light rail, tram and regional train. Only the underground rapid transit sections are listed here.)	Locale	Valencia	Line 1 (Metrovalencia) Line 2 (Metrovalencia) Line 3 (Metrovalencia) Metrovalencia				
Metrovalencia	Began operation	8 October 1988	Line 1 (Metrovalencia) Line 2 (Metrovalencia) Line 3 (Metrovalencia) Metrovalencia				
Metrovalencia	Lines in operation	3 (Note: 6 out of 12 routes use the underground sections)	Line 1 (Metrovalencia) Line 2 (Metrovalencia) Line 3 (Metrovalencia) Metrovalencia				
Metrovalencia	No. of stations	97	Line 1 (Metrovalencia) Line 2 (Metrovalencia) Line 3 (Metrovalencia) Metrovalencia				
Metrovalencia	Network length	138 km (85.7 mi)	Line 1 (Metrovalencia) Line 2 (Metrovalencia) Line 3 (Metrovalencia) Metrovalencia				
Metrovalencia	Ridership	90.4 million (2023) (Note: Ridership figures refer to the whole system)	Line 1 (Metrovalencia) Line 2 (Metrovalencia) Line 3 (Metrovalencia) Metrovalencia				

== Sweden ==
System	Information		Currently operational	Currently under construction	Currently planned	Map	Ref.
Stockholm Metro Stockholms tunnelbana	Locale	Stockholm	Blue Line (Stockholm Metro) Red Line (Stockholm Metro) Green Line (Stockholm Metro)	North extension South & East extensions North extension	Yellow Line		
Stockholm Metro Stockholms tunnelbana	Began operation	1 October 1950	Blue Line (Stockholm Metro) Red Line (Stockholm Metro) Green Line (Stockholm Metro)	North extension South & East extensions North extension	Yellow Line		
Stockholm Metro Stockholms tunnelbana	Lines in operation	3 (Note: 7 routes)	Blue Line (Stockholm Metro) Red Line (Stockholm Metro) Green Line (Stockholm Metro)	North extension South & East extensions North extension	Yellow Line		
Stockholm Metro Stockholms tunnelbana	No. of stations	100	Blue Line (Stockholm Metro) Red Line (Stockholm Metro) Green Line (Stockholm Metro)	North extension South & East extensions North extension	Yellow Line		
Stockholm Metro Stockholms tunnelbana	Network length	105.7 km (65.7 mi)	Blue Line (Stockholm Metro) Red Line (Stockholm Metro) Green Line (Stockholm Metro)	North extension South & East extensions North extension	Yellow Line		
Stockholm Metro Stockholms tunnelbana	Ridership	355 million (2018)	Blue Line (Stockholm Metro) Red Line (Stockholm Metro) Green Line (Stockholm Metro)	North extension South & East extensions North extension	Yellow Line		

== Switzerland ==
System	Information		Currently operational	Currently under construction	Currently planned	Map	Ref.
Lausanne Metro Métro de Lausanne	Locale	Lausanne	Lausanne Metro Line M1 Lausanne Metro Line M2		Lausanne Metro		
Lausanne Metro Métro de Lausanne	Began operation	24 May 1991	Lausanne Metro Line M1 Lausanne Metro Line M2		Lausanne Metro		
Lausanne Metro Métro de Lausanne	Lines in operation	2	Lausanne Metro Line M1 Lausanne Metro Line M2		Lausanne Metro		
Lausanne Metro Métro de Lausanne	No. of stations	28	Lausanne Metro Line M1 Lausanne Metro Line M2		Lausanne Metro		
Lausanne Metro Métro de Lausanne	Network length	13.7 km (8.5 mi)	Lausanne Metro Line M1 Lausanne Metro Line M2		Lausanne Metro		
Lausanne Metro Métro de Lausanne	Ridership	45.4 million (2013)	Lausanne Metro Line M1 Lausanne Metro Line M2		Lausanne Metro		

== Turkey ==
System	Information		Currently operational	Currently under construction	Currently planned	Map	Ref.
Istanbul Metro (Note: Parts of the system are located in Asia) İstanbul Metrosu	Locale	Istanbul	Line M1 Line M2 Line M3 Line M4 Line M5 Line M6 Line M7 Line M8 Line M9 M11 (Istanbul Metro)	West extension North & South extensions East extension East extension East & West extensions South extension South extension	West, North & Branch extensions Branch extension North extension		
Istanbul Metro İstanbul Metrosu	Began operation	3 September 1989	Line M1 Line M2 Line M3 Line M4 Line M5 Line M6 Line M7 Line M8 Line M9 M11 (Istanbul Metro)	West extension North & South extensions East extension East extension East & West extensions South extension South extension	West, North & Branch extensions Branch extension North extension		
Istanbul Metro İstanbul Metrosu	Lines in operation	11	Line M1 Line M2 Line M3 Line M4 Line M5 Line M6 Line M7 Line M8 Line M9 M11 (Istanbul Metro)	West extension North & South extensions East extension East extension East & West extensions South extension South extension	West, North & Branch extensions Branch extension North extension		
Istanbul Metro İstanbul Metrosu	No. of stations	137	Line M1 Line M2 Line M3 Line M4 Line M5 Line M6 Line M7 Line M8 Line M9 M11 (Istanbul Metro)	West extension North & South extensions East extension East extension East & West extensions South extension South extension	West, North & Branch extensions Branch extension North extension		
Istanbul Metro İstanbul Metrosu	Network length	243.3 km (151.2 mi)	Line M1 Line M2 Line M3 Line M4 Line M5 Line M6 Line M7 Line M8 Line M9 M11 (Istanbul Metro)	West extension North & South extensions East extension East extension East & West extensions South extension South extension	West, North & Branch extensions Branch extension North extension		
Istanbul Metro İstanbul Metrosu	Ridership	542.5 million (2022)	Line M1 Line M2 Line M3 Line M4 Line M5 Line M6 Line M7 Line M8 Line M9 M11 (Istanbul Metro)	West extension North & South extensions East extension East extension East & West extensions South extension South extension	West, North & Branch extensions Branch extension North extension		

== Ukraine ==
System	Information		Currently operational	Currently under construction	Currently planned	Map	Ref.
Dnipro Metro Дніпровський Mетрополітен	Locale	Dnipro	1	1 East extension	1 East & West extensions		
Dnipro Metro Дніпровський Mетрополітен	Began operation	29 December 1995	1	1 East extension	1 East & West extensions		
Dnipro Metro Дніпровський Mетрополітен	Lines in operation	1	1	1 East extension	1 East & West extensions		
Dnipro Metro Дніпровський Mетрополітен	No. of stations	6	1	1 East extension	1 East & West extensions		
Dnipro Metro Дніпровський Mетрополітен	Network length	7.8 km (4.8 mi)	1	1 East extension	1 East & West extensions		
Dnipro Metro Дніпровський Mетрополітен	Ridership	3.6 million (2020)	1	1 East extension	1 East & West extensions		
Kharkiv Metro Харківський Mетрополітен	Locale	Kharkiv	Kholodnohirsko-Zavodska Line Saltivska Line Oleksiivska Line	South extension	East & West extensions North & South extensions North extension		
Kharkiv Metro Харківський Mетрополітен	Began operation	23 August 1975	Kholodnohirsko-Zavodska Line Saltivska Line Oleksiivska Line	South extension	East & West extensions North & South extensions North extension		
Kharkiv Metro Харківський Mетрополітен	Lines in operation	3	Kholodnohirsko-Zavodska Line Saltivska Line Oleksiivska Line	South extension	East & West extensions North & South extensions North extension		
Kharkiv Metro Харківський Mетрополітен	No. of stations	30	Kholodnohirsko-Zavodska Line Saltivska Line Oleksiivska Line	South extension	East & West extensions North & South extensions North extension		
Kharkiv Metro Харківський Mетрополітен	Network length	38.1 km (23.7 mi)	Kholodnohirsko-Zavodska Line Saltivska Line Oleksiivska Line	South extension	East & West extensions North & South extensions North extension		
Kharkiv Metro Харківський Mетрополітен	Ridership	128.1 million (2020)	Kholodnohirsko-Zavodska Line Saltivska Line Oleksiivska Line	South extension	East & West extensions North & South extensions North extension		
Kyiv Metro Київський Mетрополітен	Locale	Kyiv	Sviatoshynsko–Brovarska Line Obolonsko–Teremkivska Line Syretsko–Pecherska Line	Podilsko–Vyhurivska Line	West extension South extension & Branch; East & West extensions East & West extensions		
Kyiv Metro Київський Mетрополітен	Began operation	6 November 1960	Sviatoshynsko–Brovarska Line Obolonsko–Teremkivska Line Syretsko–Pecherska Line	Podilsko–Vyhurivska Line	West extension South extension & Branch; East & West extensions East & West extensions		
Kyiv Metro Київський Mетрополітен	Lines in operation	3	Sviatoshynsko–Brovarska Line Obolonsko–Teremkivska Line Syretsko–Pecherska Line	Podilsko–Vyhurivska Line	West extension South extension & Branch; East & West extensions East & West extensions		
Kyiv Metro Київський Mетрополітен	No. of stations	52	Sviatoshynsko–Brovarska Line Obolonsko–Teremkivska Line Syretsko–Pecherska Line	Podilsko–Vyhurivska Line	West extension South extension & Branch; East & West extensions East & West extensions		
Kyiv Metro Київський Mетрополітен	Network length	67.6 km (42.0 mi)	Sviatoshynsko–Brovarska Line Obolonsko–Teremkivska Line Syretsko–Pecherska Line	Podilsko–Vyhurivska Line	West extension South extension & Branch; East & West extensions East & West extensions		
Kyiv Metro Київський Mетрополітен	Ridership	279.5 million (2020)	Sviatoshynsko–Brovarska Line Obolonsko–Teremkivska Line Syretsko–Pecherska Line	Podilsko–Vyhurivska Line	West extension South extension & Branch; East & West extensions East & West extensions		
Kryvyi Rih Metro (Note: The system is part metro-part tram. Only the metro section is listed here.) Криворізьке Mетро	Locale	Kryvyi Rih	Kryvyi Rih Metro				
Kryvyi Rih Metro Криворізьке Mетро	Began operation	26 December 1986	Kryvyi Rih Metro				
Kryvyi Rih Metro Криворізьке Mетро	Lines in operation	1 (Note: 3 routes, all of which use the metro section)	Kryvyi Rih Metro				
Kryvyi Rih Metro Криворізьке Mетро	No. of stations	9	Kryvyi Rih Metro				
Kryvyi Rih Metro Криворізьке Mетро	Network length	14.7 km (9.1 mi)	Kryvyi Rih Metro				
Kryvyi Rih Metro Криворізьке Mетро	Ridership	15.8 million (2009) (Note: figures account for the whole system)	Kryvyi Rih Metro				

== United Kingdom ==
System	Information		Currently operational	Currently under construction	Currently planned	Map	Ref.
Glasgow Subway	Locale	Glasgow	Glasgow Subway				
Glasgow Subway	Began operation	14 December 1896	Glasgow Subway				
Glasgow Subway	Lines in operation	1	Glasgow Subway				
Glasgow Subway	No. of stations	15	Glasgow Subway				
Glasgow Subway	Network length	10.5 km (6.5 mi)	Glasgow Subway				
Glasgow Subway	Ridership	8 million (2021)	Glasgow Subway				
Docklands Light Railway	Locale	London	Docklands Light Railway		Thamesmead extension		
Docklands Light Railway	Began operation	31 August 1987	Docklands Light Railway		Thamesmead extension		
Docklands Light Railway	Lines in operation	3 (Note: 6 routes)	Docklands Light Railway		Thamesmead extension		
Docklands Light Railway	No. of stations	45	Docklands Light Railway		Thamesmead extension		
Docklands Light Railway	Network length	38.0 km (23.6 mi)	Docklands Light Railway		Thamesmead extension		
Docklands Light Railway	Ridership	39.9 million (2020)	Docklands Light Railway		Thamesmead extension		
London Underground	Locale	London	Bakerloo line Central line (London Underground) Circle line (London Underground) District line Hammersmith & City line Jubilee line Metropolitan line Northern line Piccadilly line Victoria line Waterloo & City line		Lewisham extension		
London Underground	Began operation	10 January 1863 (Note: Electrified in 1890)	Bakerloo line Central line (London Underground) Circle line (London Underground) District line Hammersmith & City line Jubilee line Metropolitan line Northern line Piccadilly line Victoria line Waterloo & City line		Lewisham extension		
London Underground	Lines in operation	11	Bakerloo line Central line (London Underground) Circle line (London Underground) District line Hammersmith & City line Jubilee line Metropolitan line Northern line Piccadilly line Victoria line Waterloo & City line		Lewisham extension		
London Underground	No. of stations	272	Bakerloo line Central line (London Underground) Circle line (London Underground) District line Hammersmith & City line Jubilee line Metropolitan line Northern line Piccadilly line Victoria line Waterloo & City line		Lewisham extension		
London Underground	Network length	402.0 km (249.8 mi)	Bakerloo line Central line (London Underground) Circle line (London Underground) District line Hammersmith & City line Jubilee line Metropolitan line Northern line Piccadilly line Victoria line Waterloo & City line		Lewisham extension		
London Underground	Ridership	296 million (2021)	Bakerloo line Central line (London Underground) Circle line (London Underground) District line Hammersmith & City line Jubilee line Metropolitan line Northern line Piccadilly line Victoria line Waterloo & City line		Lewisham extension		
Tyne and Wear Metro	Locale	Newcastle/Sunderland	Green Yellow		Washington extension		
Tyne and Wear Metro	Began operation	11 August 1980	Green Yellow		Washington extension		
Tyne and Wear Metro	Lines in operation	2	Green Yellow		Washington extension		
Tyne and Wear Metro	No. of stations	60	Green Yellow		Washington extension		
Tyne and Wear Metro	Network length	77.5 km (48.2 mi)	Green Yellow		Washington extension		
Tyne and Wear Metro	Ridership	24.3 million (2021)	Green Yellow		Washington extension		

== See also ==
- List of metro systems
- Rail transport in Europe
