= Ambachtsland metro station =

Metro station in Rotterdam, Netherlands

Ambachtsland
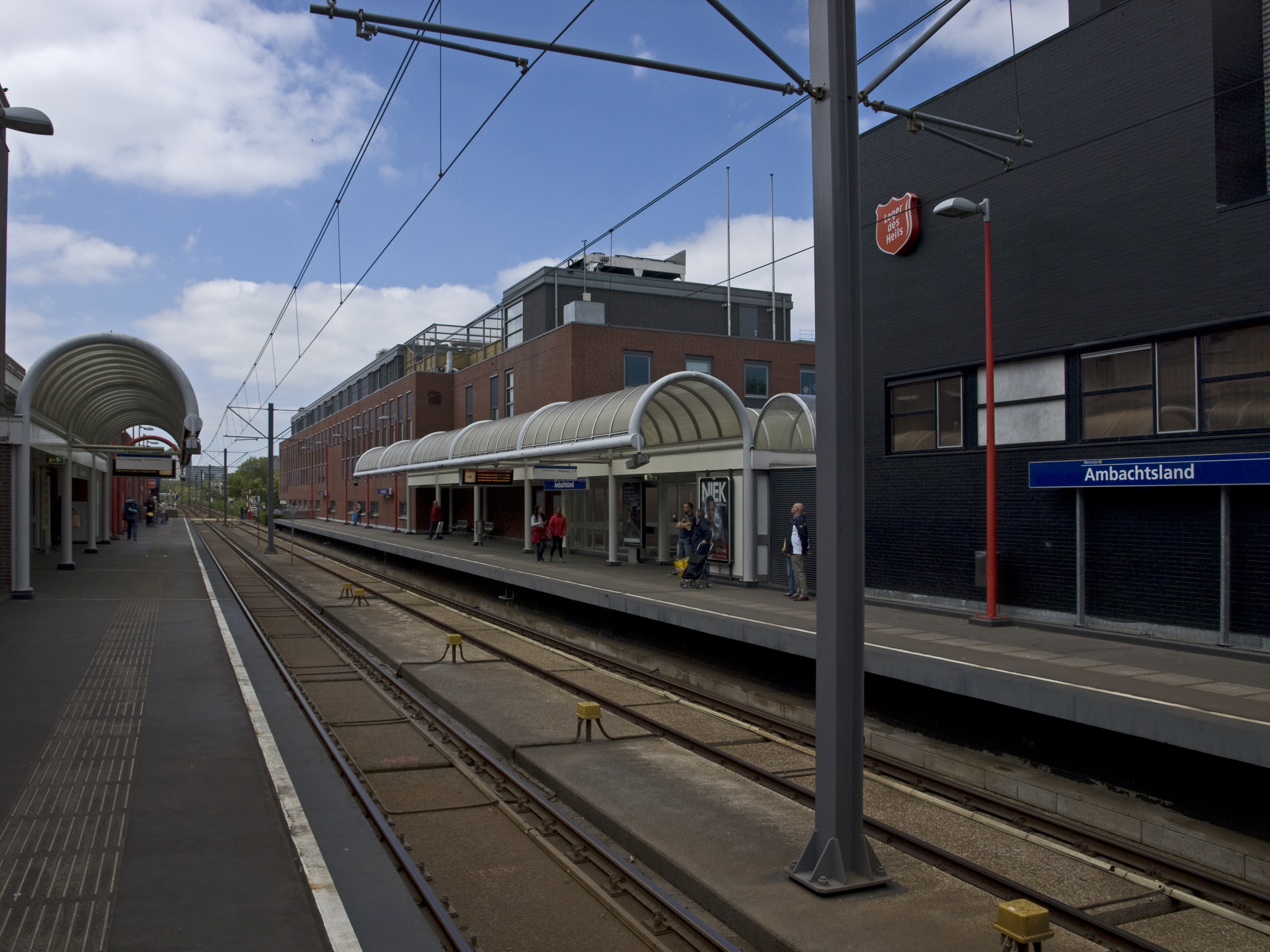
- The platforms from the east

General information
- Coordinates: 51°57′57″N 4°34′13″E
- System: Rotterdam Metro station
- Owner: RET
- Platforms: Side platforms
- Tracks: 2

History
- Opened: 1984

Services
Preceding station	Rotterdam Metro	Following station
Nieuw Verlaat towards Hoek van Holland Strand	Line B	De Tochten towards Nesselande
Location

Ambachtsland is a station on Line B of the Rotterdam Metro and is situated in the Zevenkamp neighbourhood of Rotterdam. Near the station is Zevenkamp shopping mall, and also a community centre called Youngsters, where there is a church service every Sunday morning.
