= De Tochten metro station =

De Tochten
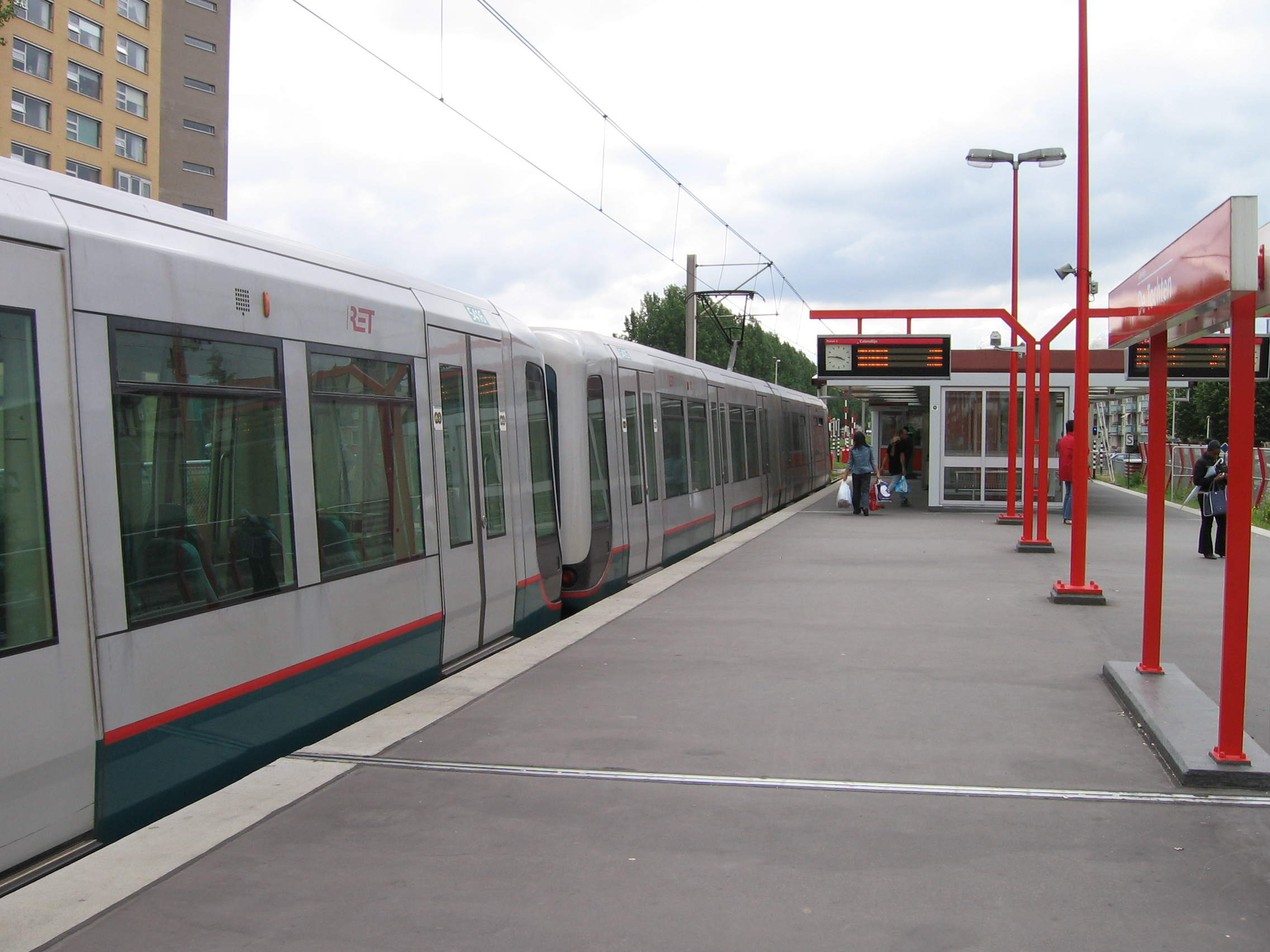

General information
- Coordinates: 51°58′7.37″N 4°34′41.32″E
- System: Rotterdam Metro station
- Owner: RET
- Platforms: Island platform
- Tracks: 2

History
- Opened: 1984

Services
Preceding station	Rotterdam Metro	Following station
Ambachtsland towards Hoek van Holland Strand	Line B	Nesselande Terminus
Location

De Tochten is a station on Line B of the Rotterdam Metro and is situated in Rotterdam-Zevenkamp.

The station was opened on 19 April 1984. It served as terminus for over twenty years until the opening of the one-station extension towards the new Nesselande station on 29 August 2005. De Tochten lies on the section where traction power is received from overhead wires, although trains have to switch back to third rail power just east of the station for their journey to Nesselande.

The station consists of one island platform between the two running tracks.
