= Rotterdam Metro line A =

Rotterdam Metro Line A

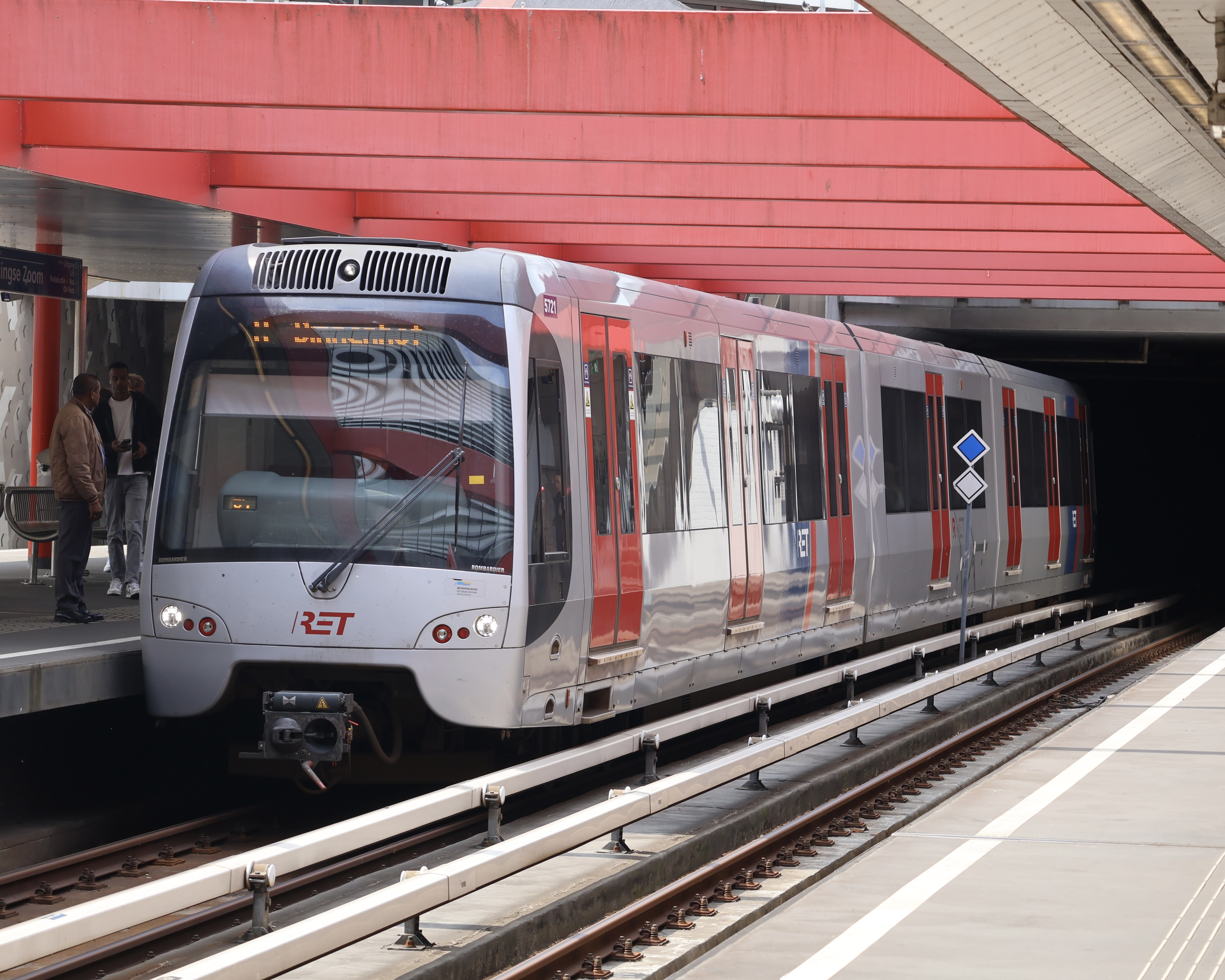
- A Line A 5700 series train at Kralingse Zoom Station

Overview
- Native name: Metrolijn A
- Owner: RET
- Locale: Rotterdam, Schiedam
- Termini: Binnenhof; Schiedam Centrum
- Stations: 24
- Color on map: Green

Service
- Type: Rapid transit
- Operator: Rotterdam Metro
- Rolling stock: 5400 series 5600 series 5700 series

History
- Opened: 6 May 1982; 44 years ago
- Last extension: 2019

Technical
- Line length: 17.2 km (10.7 mi)
- Number of tracks: 2
- Track gauge: 1,435 mm (4 ft 8 1/2 in)
- Electrification: 750 V DC; Overhead line (Binnenhof to Capelsebrug); Third rail
- Conduction system: With driver
- Operating speed: 100 km/h (62 mph)
Route map

The Rotterdam Metro Line A (Dutch: Metrolijn A) is a rapid transit line in Rotterdam and Schiedam, the Netherlands, operated by Rotterdamse Elektrische Tram (RET). The line runs from Binnenhof in the Ommoord district to Schiedam Centrum. Until every metro line received its own letter on 13 December 2009, it was part of the Caland Line. The line follows largely the same route as Metro Line B; after Graskruid, the two lines split. The longer Line B connects the Nesselande and Hoek van Holland Strand, while the shorter Line A runs on the busier middle section of this route between Schiedam Centrum and Binnenhof.

The section from Capelsebrug to terminus Binnenhof is built as a light rail (sneltram).

== Operations ==
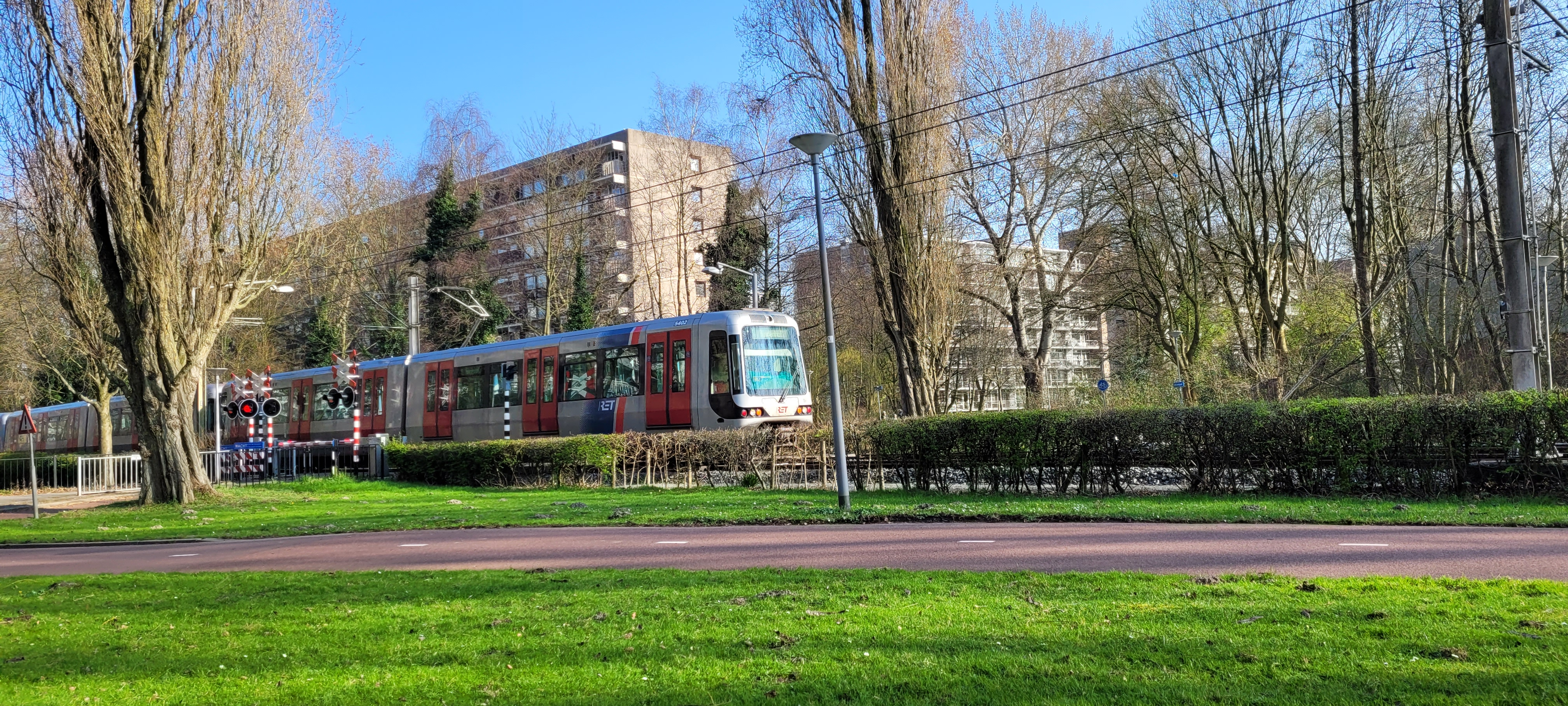
A train from Romeynshof to Binnenhof

Metro Line A has two fixed routes: on weekdays during the day, the line runs from Binnenhof to Schiedam Centrum. In the evenings (from 7:00 p.m.) and on Saturday and Sunday mornings (until 10:00 a.m.), the line is shortened to the route Binnenhof – Kralingse Zoom.

Between 27 August 2018 and August 2019, the metro trains continued past Schiedam Centrum until Pernis, located on Metro Line C, until 7:00 p.m.. The reason for this was that shuttle buses ran toward Vlaardingen from Vijfsluizen, and the reversing track at Schiedam Centrum was used for testing and trial operations on the Schiedam–Hoek van Holland Line (Hoekse Lijn). In 2021, for a certain period, only shuttle metros operated between Binnenhof and Graskruid. The remaining part of Metro Line A was temporarily removed from service. From mid-October 2021, Line A trains operated normally again, except for peak-hour services between Schiedam Centrum and Vlaardingen West. The suspension was caused by, among other factors, a shortage of metro trainsets due to maintenance.

Hour(s)	Weekly frequencies				Holiday frequencies			
Hour(s)	Monday to Thursday	Friday	Saturday	Sunday	Monday to Thursday	Friday	Saturday	Sunday
05.30 - 07.00	4×/hour	4×/hour	-	-	4×/hour	4×/hour	-	-
07.00 - 08.00	6×/hour	6×/hour	4×/hour*	-	4×/hour	4×/hour	4×/hour*	-
08.00 - 09.00	6×/hour	6×/hour	4×/hour*	4×/hour*	4×/hour	4×/hour	4×/hour*	4×/hour*
09.00 - 10.00	6×/hour	6×/hour	4×/hour*	4×/hour*	4×/hour	4×/hour	4×/hour*	4×/hour*
10.00 - 11.00	6×/hour	6×/hour	4×/hour	4×/hour	4×/hour	4×/hour	4×/hour	4×/hour
11.00 - 16.00	6×/hour	6×/hour	6×/hour	4×/hour	4×/hour	4×/hour	4×/hour	4×/hour
16.00 - 18.00	6×/hour	6×/hour^	6×/hour	4×/hour	4×/hour	4×/hour	4×/hour	4×/hour
18.00 - 19.00	6×/hour	6×/hour	4×/hour	4×/hour	4×/hour	4×/hour	4×/hour	4×/hour
19.00 - 00.30	4×/hour*	4×/hour*	4×/hour*	4×/hour*	4×/hour*	4×/hour*	4×/hour*	4×/hour*
00.30 - 01.30	-	1×/hour	1×/hour	-	-	1×/hour	1×/hour	-

At these times, line A will not run further than Kralingse Zoom. (*)

The line is operated from the 's-Gravenweg depot.

== Station list ==
Station	Transfers	Location
Binnenhof		Ommoord
Romeynshof		Ommoord
Graskruid	B Line B	Prins Alexander
Rotterdam Alexander	B Line B; Utrecht–Rotterdam railway	Prins Alexander
Oosterflank	B Line B	Prins Alexander
Prinsenlaan	B Line B	Prins Alexander
Schenkel	B Line B	Prins Alexander
Capelsebrug	B Line B; C Line C	Kralingen
Kralingse Zoom	B Line B; C Line C	Kralingen
Voorschoterlaan	B Line B; C Line C	Kralingen
Gerdesiaweg	B Line B; C Line C	Kralingen
Oostplein	B Line B; C Line C	Centrum
Rotterdam Blaak	B Line B; C Line C; Breda–Rotterdam railway	Centrum
Beurs	B Line B; C Line C; D Line D; E Line E	Centrum
Eendrachtsplein	B Line B; C Line C	Centrum
Dijkzigt	B Line B; C Line C	Centrum
Coolhaven	B Line B; C Line C	Delfshaven
Delfshaven	B Line B; C Line C	Delfshaven
Marconiplein	B Line B; C Line C	Delfshaven
Schiedam Centrum	B Line B; C Line C; Amsterdam–Rotterdam railway; Schiedam–Hoek van Holland railway	Schiedam
Schiedam Nieuwland	B Line B	Schiedam
Vlaardingen Oost	B Line B	Vlaardingen
Vlaardingen Centrum	B Line B	Vlaardingen
Vlaardingen West	B Line B	Vlaardingen

== History ==
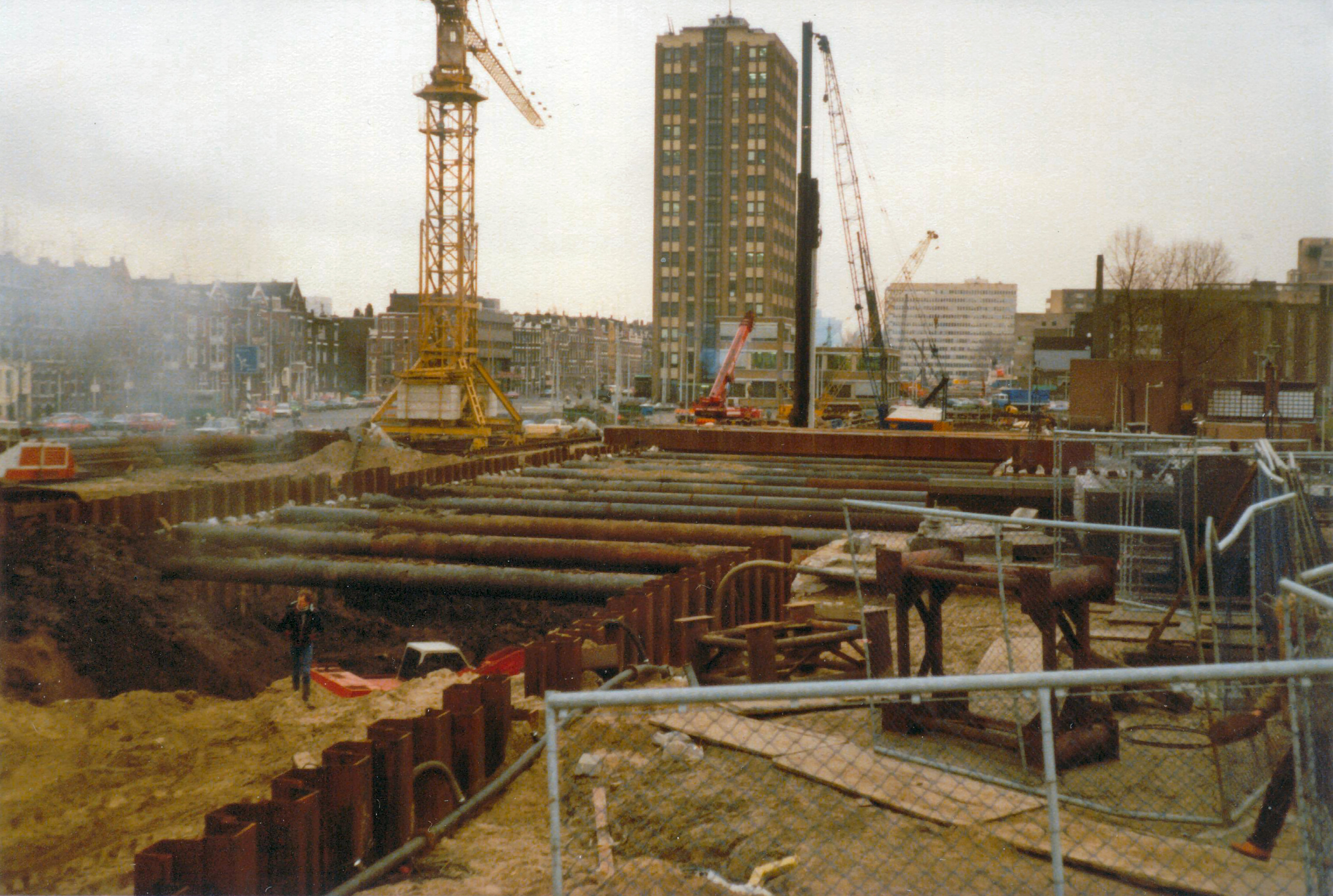
Construction of Coolhaven station in 1979

On 6 May 1982, the second metro line in Rotterdam was opened between Capelsebrug and Coolhaven, then called the East–West Line. On 27 May 1983, the line was extended as a light rail to its current terminus Binnenhof in the Ommoord district. A planned stop near ’s-Gravenweg and Veerseheuvel, between Capelsebrug and Oosterflank, was never realized. On 25 April 1986, the line was extended westward to Marconiplein station. Together with the branch to Zevenkamp, opened in 1984 (now part of Metro Line B), this formed the basis of the East–West Line for many years. In the early period, metro trains to Ommoord and Zevenkamp ran coupled together up to Alexander station, after which the trains were split: two carriages continued to Zevenkamp and one to Ommoord. On the return journey, the trains were coupled again. However, this caused several practical problems, and the practice was abandoned on 1 April 1985, after which separate trains ran from the city center to Ommoord and Zevenkamp.

After a second branch was opened in 1994 to Capelle aan den IJssel, a westward extension from Marconiplein followed on 4 November 2002, connecting via Schiedam and Pernis to the new Tussenwater station on Metro Line D toward De Akkers. Between 2002 and 2005, trains from Binnenhof also ran at certain times over the new route to De Akkers; since 29 August 2005, these no longer went beyond Schiedam Centrum station.

The line has been renamed multiple times over the years. Originally, together with the current Line B, it formed the East–West Line. In 1994, when the branch to Capelle aan den IJssel was opened, the metro lines were given color designations, and the line to Binnenhof was marked in orange. Trains heading to Binnenhof also displayed the district name Ommoord as their final destination on the vehicle signage, instead of the name of the actual terminus, Binnenhof. In 1997, the name East–West Line was replaced with Calandlijn, with red as the color for all three branches. However, destination signs continued to use orange for the Ommoord services until 2002. From 13 December 2009, RET discontinued the name Calandlijn; since then, the line has been known as Metro Line A, with green as its line color. On the same day, Ommoord as the indicated terminus name was also dropped, and since then the terminus name Binnenhof has again been used.

In the summer of 2010, Line A became 200 meters shorter, as the siding tracks near Binnenhof station were removed. Between April and July 2017, and again between September 2017 and February 2018, the route was temporarily extended during peak hours to Pernis (excluding school holidays).

As of 30 September 2019, the Hoekse Line was connected to the metro network at Schiedam Centrum station. Starting 4 November 2019, Metro Line A ran during peak hours to Vlaardingen West.

Beginning 26 October 2020, the peak-hour services of Line A to Vlaardingen West were discontinued due to staff shortages. For the same reason, there were periods when the line only operated between Binnenhof and Capelsebrug.

Between 13 September and 23 October 2021, Line A was shortened due to a shortage of rolling stock, and only operated on the route Graskruid – Binnenhof via Romeynshof. At Graskruid station, passengers could transfer to Line B, ensuring that all metro stations on Line A remained served.
