= Berg en Broeksche Verlaat =

Canal lock in Rotterdam, Netherlands

Coordinates: 51°56′46″N 4°29′23″E

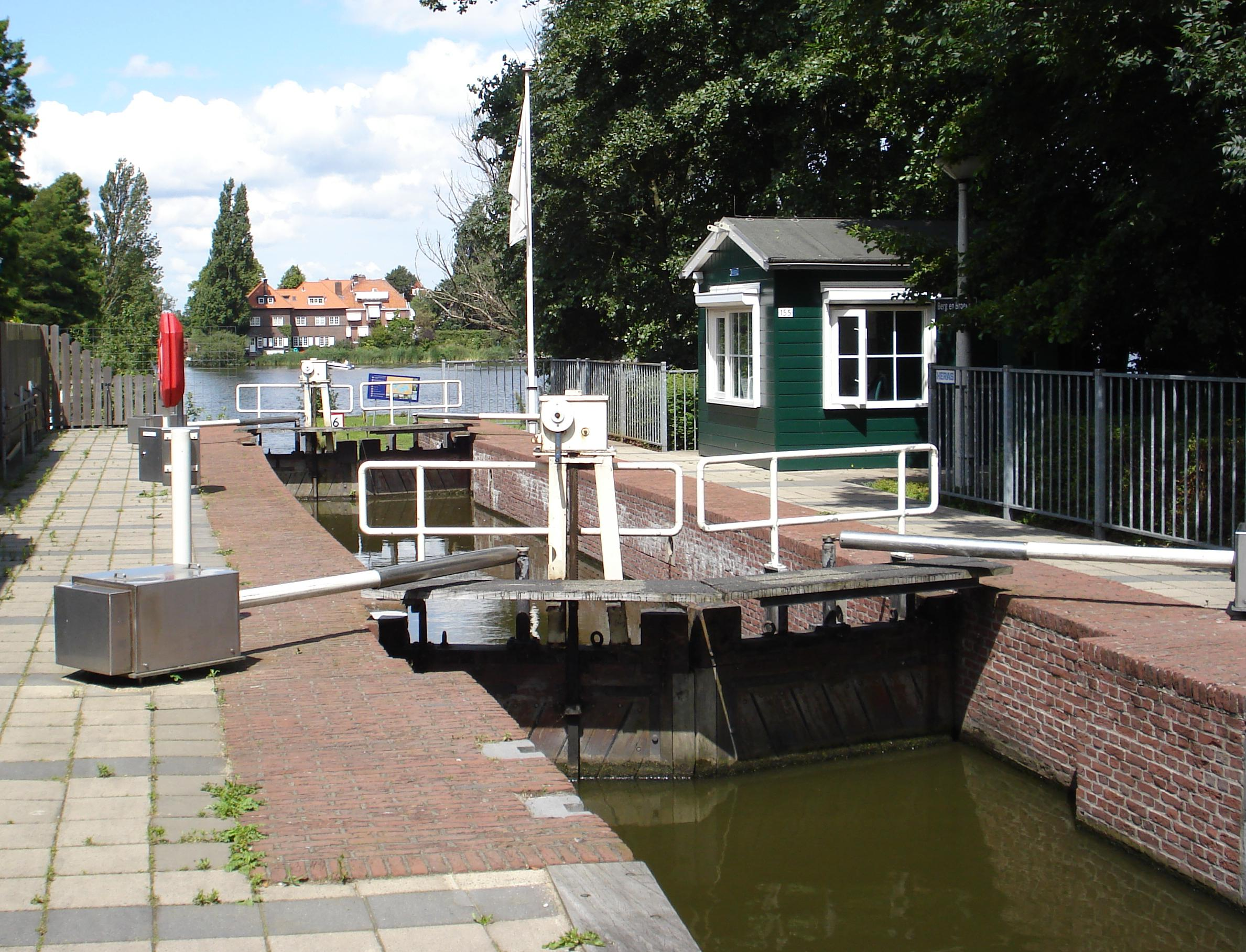
The Berg en Broeksche Verlaat

The Berg en Broeksche Verlaat is a canal lock in Rotterdam between the River Rotte and 2 peat bogs. It was built in 1866 and has Rijksmonument status.
