= Hesseplaats metro station =

Metro station in Rotterdam, Netherlands

Hesseplaats
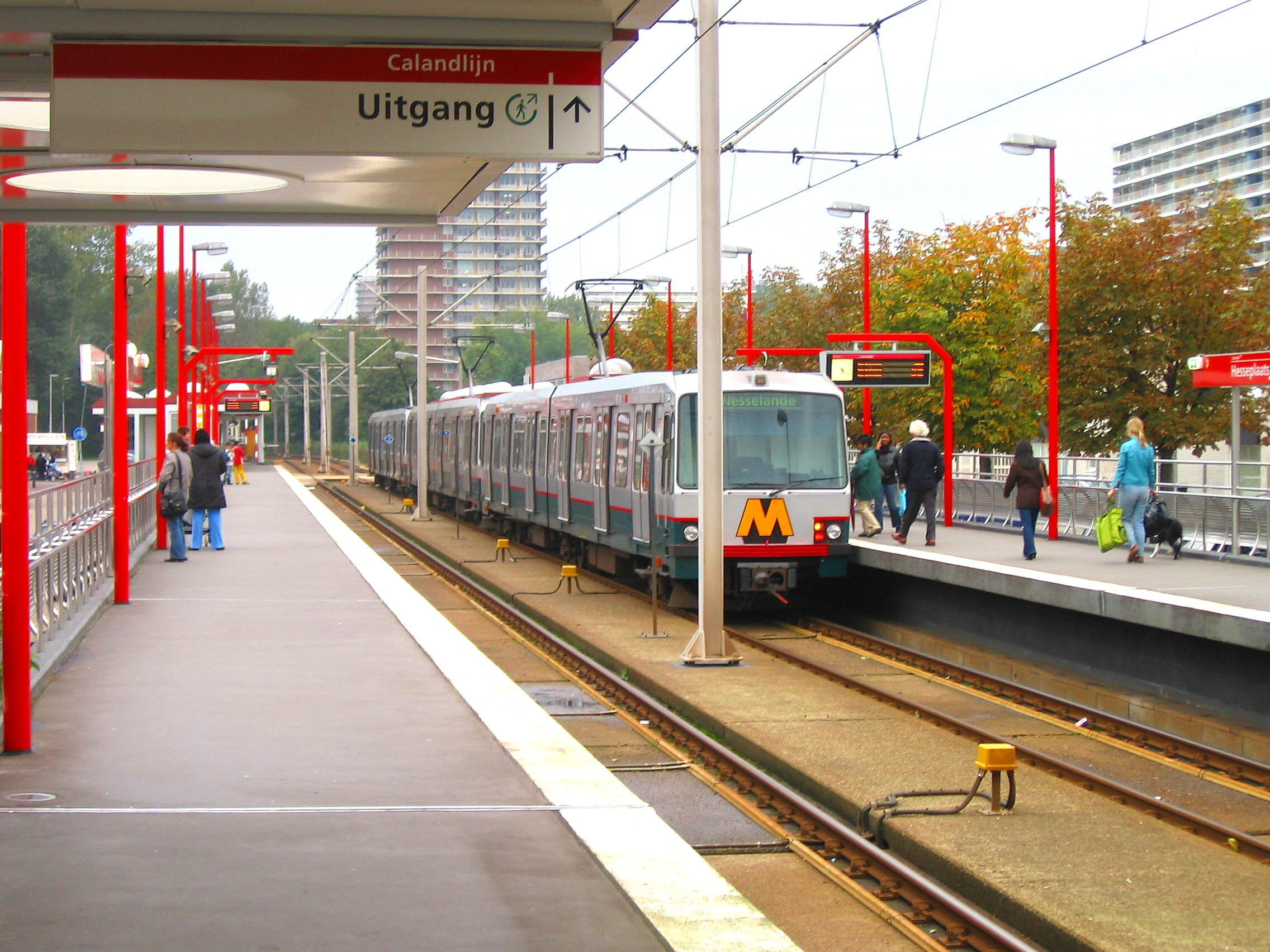

General information
- Coordinates: 51°57′47″N 4°33′08″E
- System: Rotterdam Metro station
- Owner: RET
- Platforms: Side platforms
- Tracks: 2

History
- Opened: 1984

Services
Preceding station	Rotterdam Metro	Following station
Graskruid towards Hoek van Holland Strand	Line B	Nieuw Verlaat towards Nesselande
Location

Hesseplaats is a station on Line B of the Rotterdam Metro and is situated in the Ommoord district of Rotterdam.
