= Boterdorpse Verlaat =

Coordinates: 51.9519°N 4.5075°E

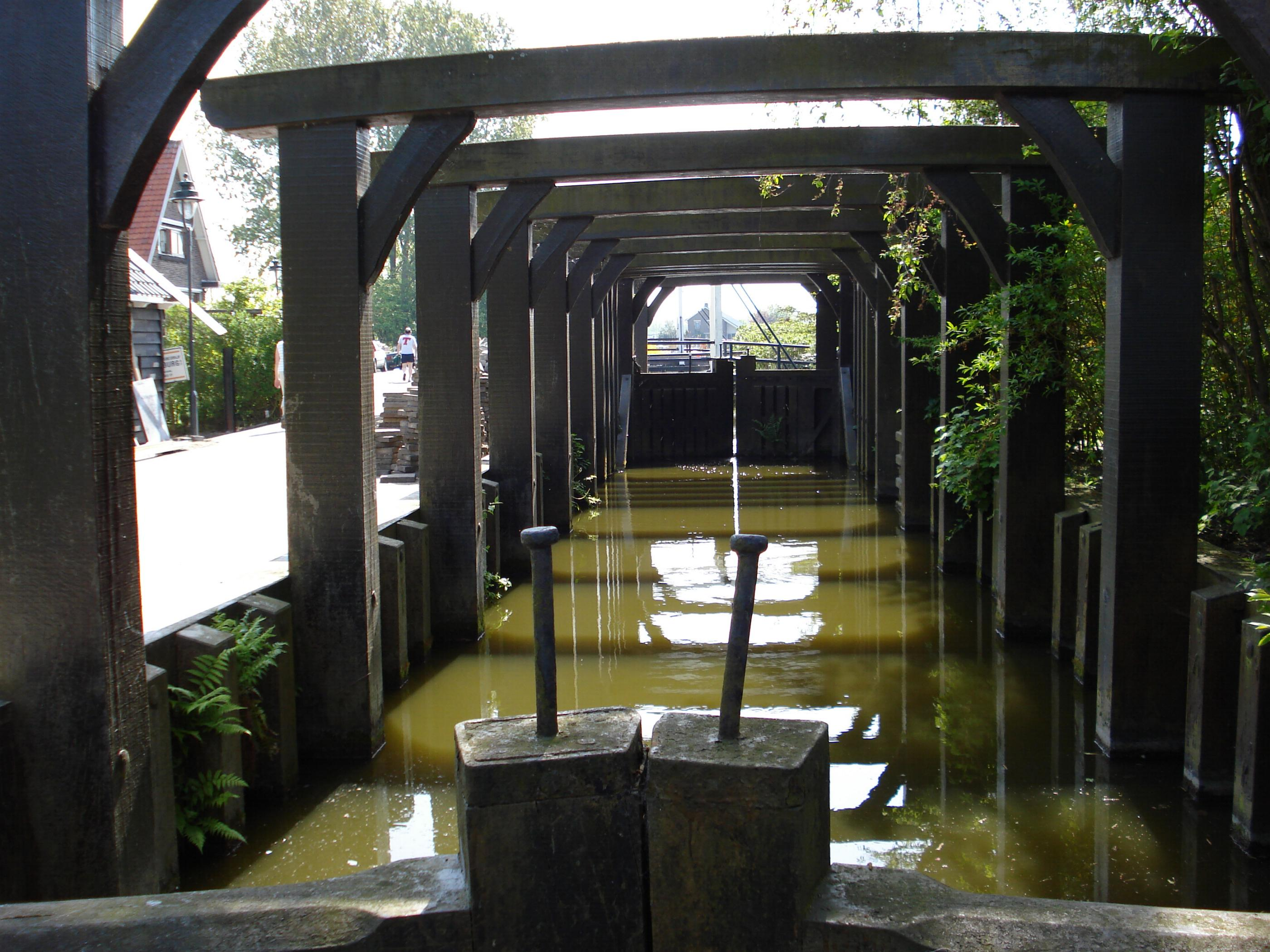
Het Boterdorpse Verlaat

The Boterdorpse Verlaat is a lock between the River Rotte and Strekvaart in Bergse Plassen in the municipality of Rotterdam. The fairway was formerly used by vessels carrying malt wastes from distilleries and beer breweries in Schiedam and Rotterdam, but nowadays is very rarely used even for pleasure.

The current lock dates from 1740 and has the characteristic performance of locks from that period. The lock walls are not brick, but of wood. The construction is up, along with wooden yokes. A similar lock is the Bleiswijkse Verlaat.

The earliest known records of the existing of a lock here date back to 1621 and several notices have been found dated between 1683-1691 of the lock being closed for repairs.
