= Nieuw Verlaat metro station =

Metro station in Rotterdam, Netherlands

Nieuw Verlaat
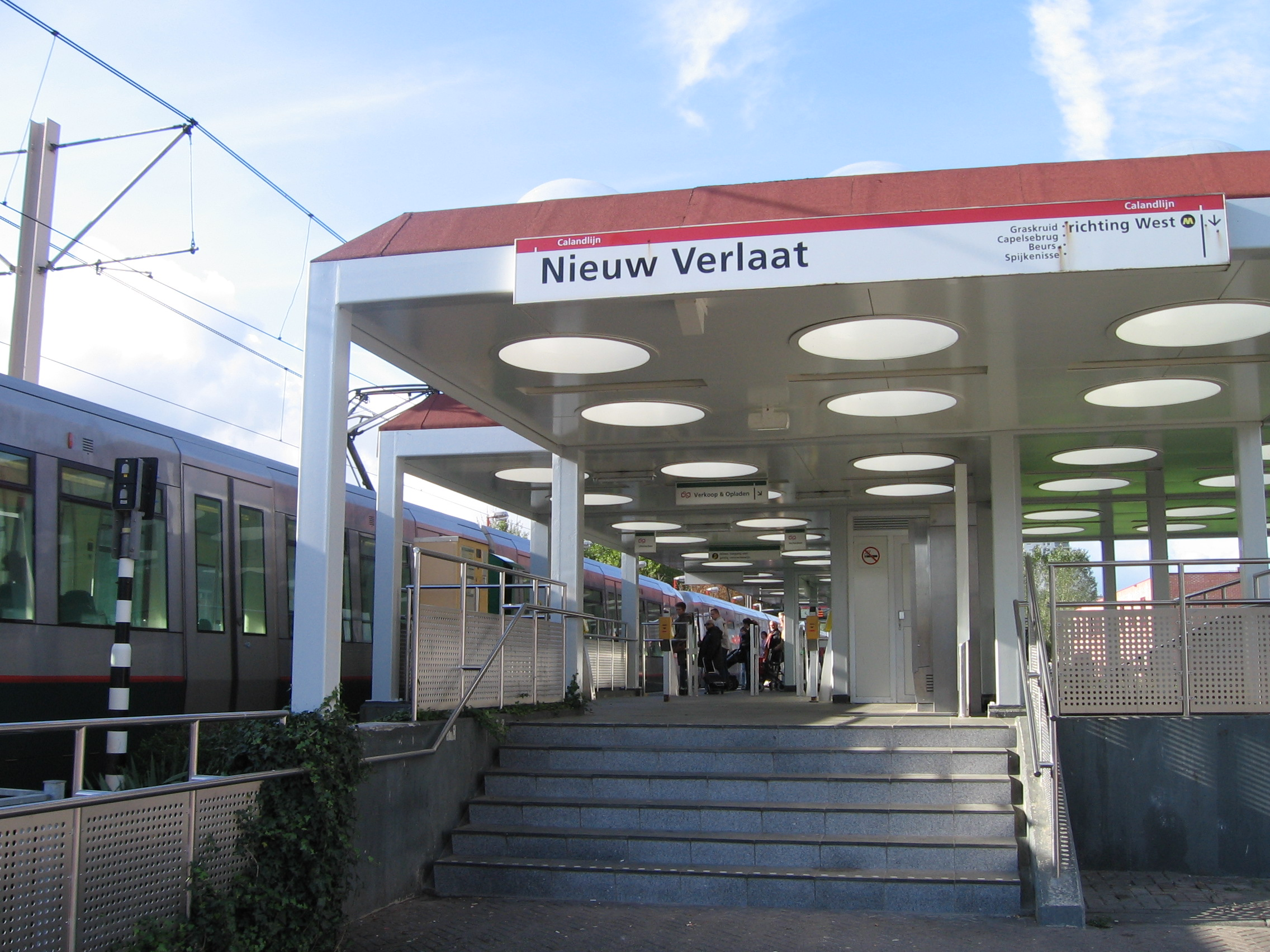

General information
- Coordinates: 51°57′53.5″N 4°33′43″E
- System: Rotterdam Metro station
- Owner: RET
- Platforms: Side platforms
- Tracks: 2

Services
Preceding station	Rotterdam Metro	Following station
Hesseplaats towards Hoek van Holland Strand	Line B	Ambachtsland towards Nesselande
Location

Nieuw Verlaat is a station on Line B of the Rotterdam Metro and is situated in the Zevenkamp neighbourhood of Rotterdam.
