= Zevenkamp =

Coordinates: 51°58′06″N 4°34′24″E

- Neighborhood of Rotterdam
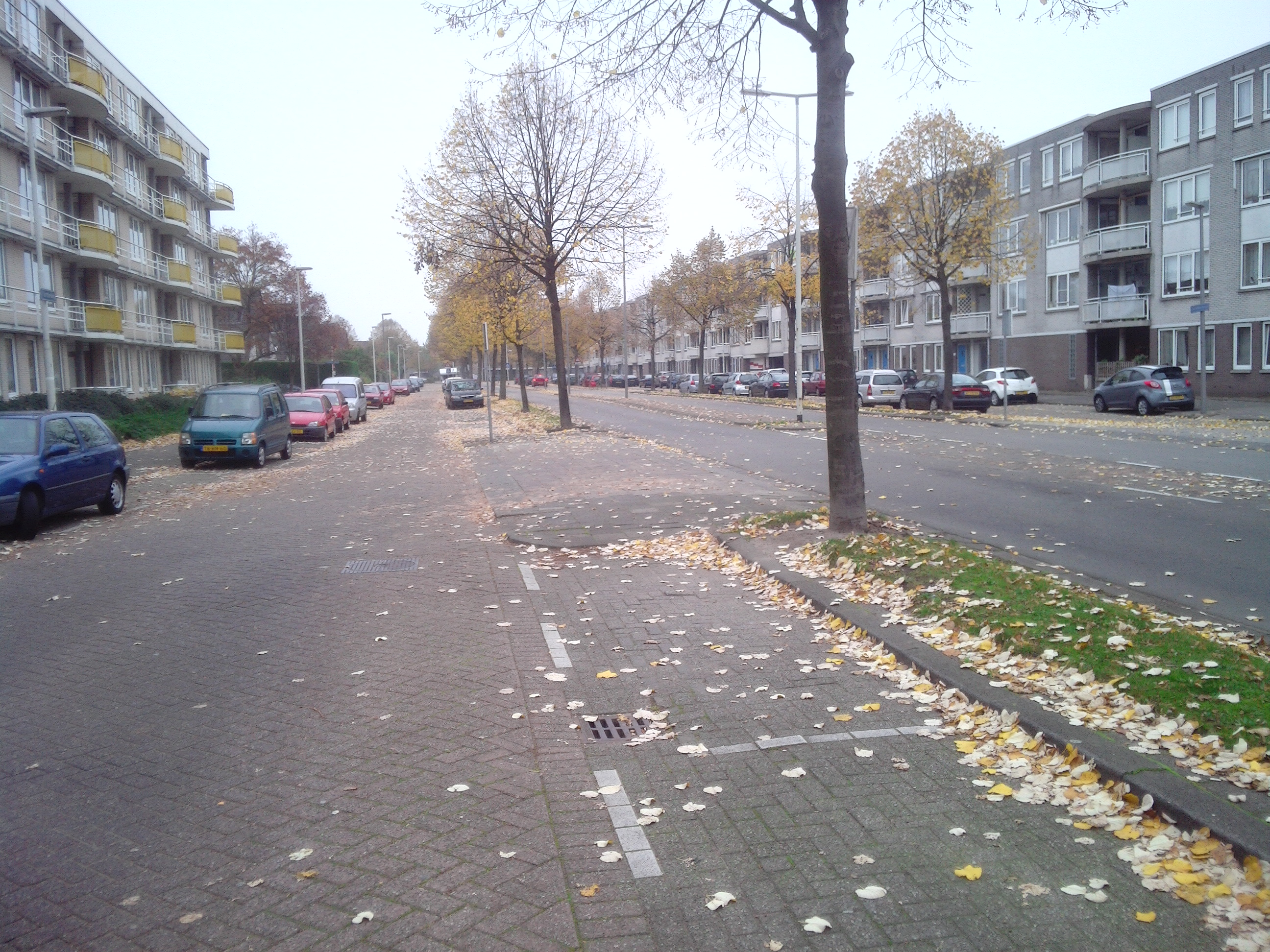
- The Tochtenweg in Rotterdam-Zevenkamp.
- Interactive map of Zevenkamp
- Country: Netherlands
- Province: South Holland
- COROP: Rotterdam
- Borough: Prins Alexander
- Time zone: UTC+1 (CET)
- Website: Rotterdam.nl - Zevenkamp

Zevenkamp is a neighbourhood in the borough Prins Alexander, Rotterdam.

== History ==
The City of Rotterdam, Netherlands acquired the about 540 acres in 1978, in a land exchange with Capelle aan den IJssel and Zevenhuizen. Until then, the area was a rural polder.
