= Rotterdam Blaak station =

Railway station in Rotterdam, Netherlands

Rotterdam Blaak
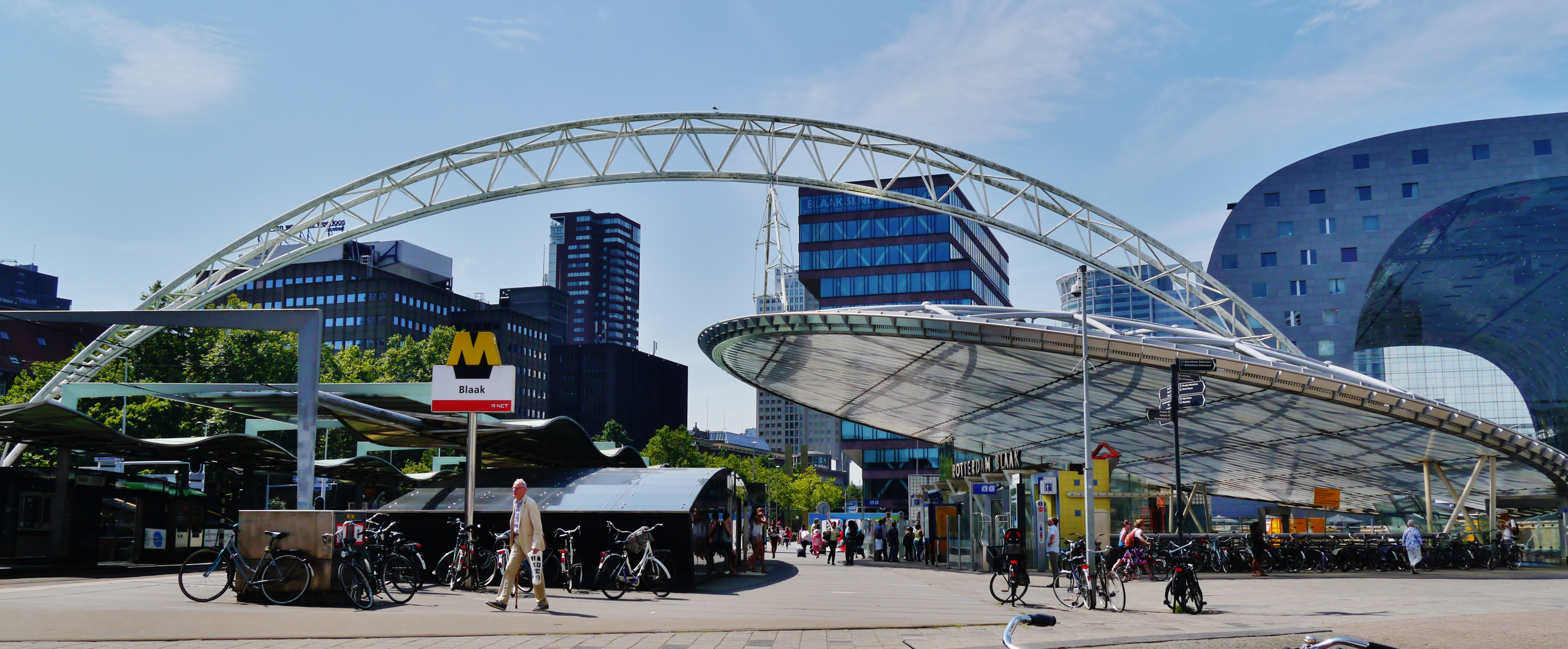

General information
- Location: Rotterdam, Netherlands
- Coordinates: 51°55′12″N 4°29′21″E
- Line: Breda–Rotterdam railway
- Platforms: 4
- Connections: RET Rotterdam Metro: A, B, C RET Rotterdam Tram: 1, 11; RET: 32, 47

Construction
- Structure type: Underground

Other information
- Station code: Rtb

History
- Opened: 1877

Services
Preceding station	Nederlandse Spoorwegen	Following station
Rotterdam Centraal towards Amsterdam Centraal	NS Intercity 2200	Dordrecht towards Vlissingen
Rotterdam Centraal towards Amsterdam Centraal	NS Intercity 2300 Mon-Fri until 20:00	Dordrecht towards Vlissingen
Rotterdam Centraal towards Venlo	NS Intercity 3500	Dordrecht Terminus
Rotterdam Centraal towards Den Haag Centraal	NS Sprinter 5000 Mon-Fri until 20:00	Rotterdam Zuid towards Dordrecht
Rotterdam Centraal towards Den Haag Centraal	NS Sprinter 5100	Rotterdam Zuid towards Dordrecht
Rotterdam Centraal towards Den Haag Centraal	NS Sprinter 5200 Mon-Thu until 19:00	Rotterdam Zuid towards Dordrecht
Preceding station	Rotterdam Metro	Following station
Beurs towards Vlaardingen West	Line A Not on evenings and early weekend mornings	Oostplein towards Binnenhof
Beurs towards Hoek van Holland Strand	Line B	Oostplein towards Nesselande
Beurs towards De Akkers	Line C	Oostplein towards De Terp
Location
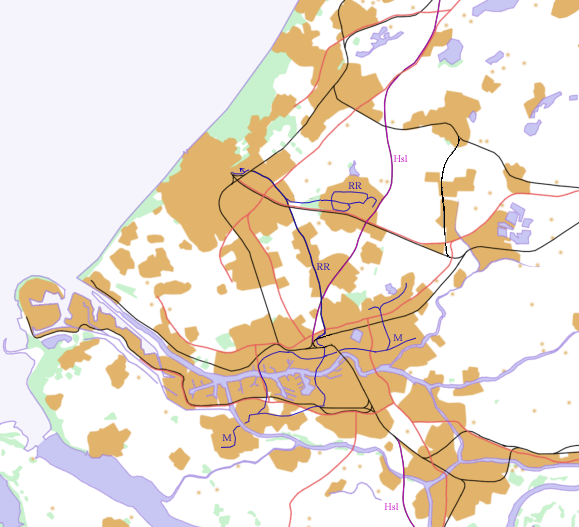
- Location within Southwest Randstad Location within Netherlands

Rotterdam Blaak is a railway and metro station in Rotterdam, Netherlands. Located in the centre of the city, not far from the cube houses and the Markthal, the station is served by trains operating on the Breda–Rotterdam railway between Rotterdam Centraal and Dordrecht.

The first railway station at this location – then called Rotterdam Beurs – was opened on 2 May 1877. It formed part of a 2.2 km (1.4 mi) long viaduct. Destroyed during World War II, it was replaced by a new station, Rotterdam Blaak, in 1953.

The underground metro station opened on 6 May 1982, with space reserved for a possible underground railway station directly underneath it. On 15 September 1993, this new underground railway station was opened, as part of a 2.8 km (1.7 mi) long tunnel. This tunnel, including the station, had four tracks instead of the two on the viaduct. Train services are operated by Nederlandse Spoorwegen (NS).

== Train services ==
The following services call at Rotterdam Blaak:

- 2x per hour national (Intercity) service from Amsterdam to Haarlem, Leiden, The Hague, Rotterdam, Dordrecht, Roosendaal and Vlissingen
- 2x per hour national (Intercity) service from Lelystad to Almere, Duivendrecht, Amsterdam Zuid, Schiphol Airport, Leiden, The Hague, Rotterdam and Dordrecht
- 4x per hour local service (Sprinter) from The Hague to Rotterdam and Dordrecht

== Other public transport ==
The metro of lines A, B, and C call at the subway station, simply called Blaak.

Several Rotterdam tram and city bus lines call at the Rotterdam Blaak station. A tram stop is located between the entrances of the railway and the metro station, where line 1 and line 11 stop. All subway lines, trams and city buses are operated by RET

The routes of the city buses and trams are as follows:

Line	Type	Route	Frequency	Notes
11	Tram	De Esch - Woudestein - Oostplein - Station Blaak - Beurs - Centraal Station - Middellandstraat - Marconiplein - Station Schiedam Centrum - Schiedam, Bachplein - Schiedam, Woudhoek	Outside Summer and Christmas holidays: 4x/hour, but only 3x/hour on weekends; Summer and Christmas holidays: 3x/hour	Not on evenings and early Sunday mornings
1	Tram	De Esch - Woudestein - Oostplein - Station Blaak - Beurs - Centraal Station - Middellandstraat - Marconiplein - Station Schiedam Centrum - Schiedam, Bachplein - Vlaardingen, Holy	Outside Summer and Christmas holidays: 4x/hour, but only 3x/hour on weekends; Summer and Christmas holidays: 3x/hour	
32	Bus	Overschie - Oude Westen - Eendrachtsplein - Station Blaak - Feijenoord - Station Zuid	Outside Summer and Christmas holidays: 4x/hour, but 6x/hour during weekdays rush hours and only 3x/hour on evenings; Summer and Christmas holidays: 4x/hour, but only 3x/hour on evenings	
47	Bus	Station Blaak -> Noordereiland -> Station Blaak	3x/hour	
B5	Bus	Centraal Station -> Beurs -> Station Blaak -> Oostplein -> Kralingen -> Lage Land -> Oosterflank Metro station -> Capelle aan den IJssel -> Station Capelle Schollevaar -> Zevenkamp -> Graskruid Metro station -> Station Alexander -> Centraal Station	1x/hour	Nightbus service, Friday Night and Saturday Night only
