= Prinsenlaan metro station =

Metro station in Rotterdam, Netherlands

Prinsenlaan
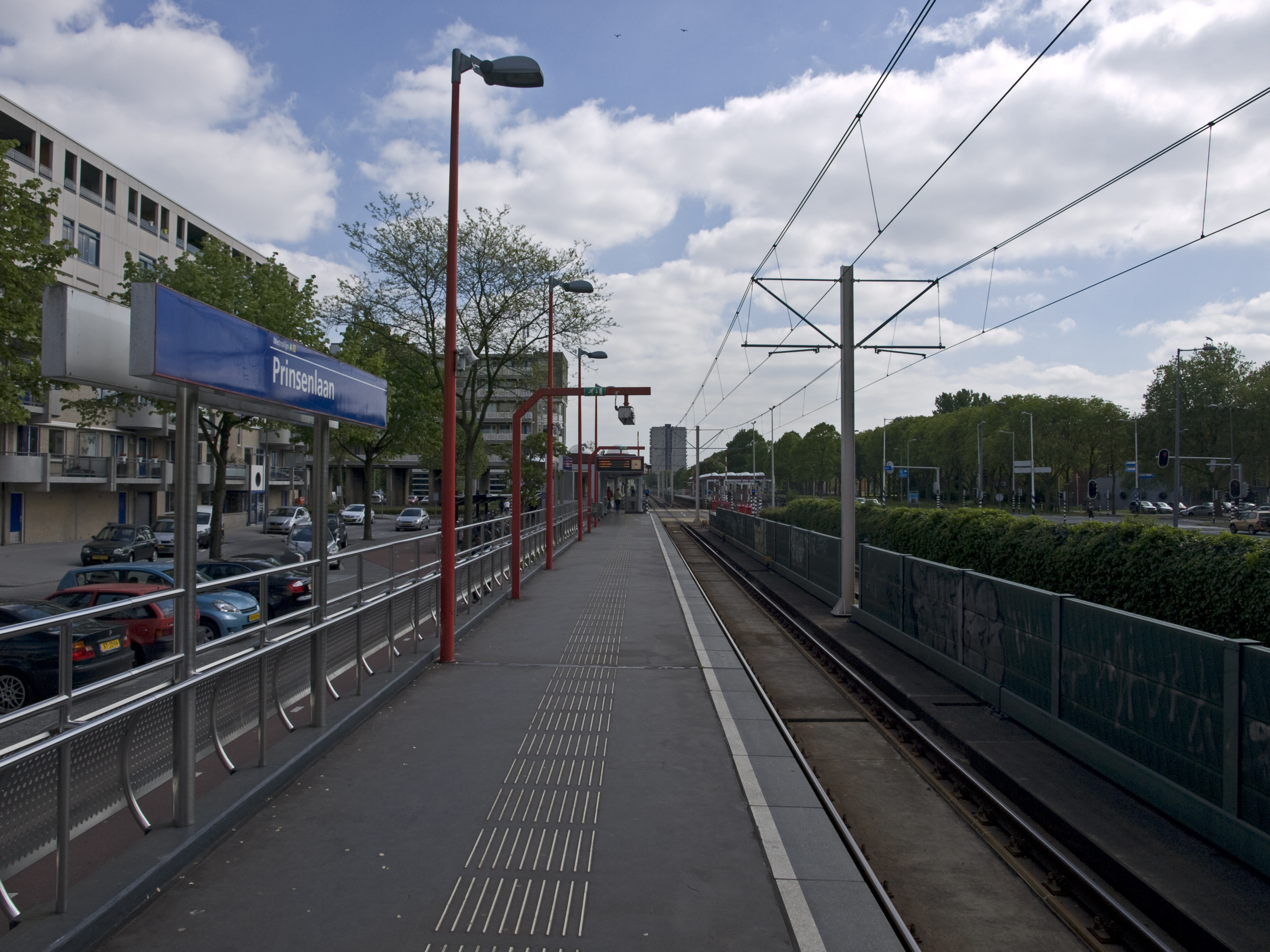

General information
- Coordinates: 51°56′27″N 4°33′24″E
- System: Rotterdam Metro station
- Owner: RET
- Platforms: Side platforms
- Tracks: 2

Construction
- Accessible: Yes

History
- Opened: May 28, 1983

Services
Preceding station	Rotterdam Metro	Following station
Schenkel towards Vlaardingen West	Line A Not on evenings and early weekend mornings	Oosterflank towards Binnenhof
Schenkel towards Kralingse Zoom	Line A Evenings and early weekend mornings only	Oosterflank towards Binnenhof
Schenkel towards Hoek van Holland Strand	Line B	Oosterflank towards Nesselande
Location

Prinsenlaan is a subway station on Rotterdam Metro lines A and B, and is situated in the northeastern part of Rotterdam, in Prins Alexander borough. The station is located between the neighbourhoods of Het Lage Land and Oosterflank.

The station is served by line A towards Binnenhof and Schiedam Centrum and line B towards Nesselande and Hoek van Holland Strand. In the evening, line A only operates as far as Kralingse Zoom. Prinsenlaan station was opened on 28 May 1983, with the opening of the first light rail section extending eastwards from Capelsebrug.

The station is situated at the junction of Prins Alexanderlaan and Prinsenlaan. Its two side platforms are positioned on opposite sides of the intersection, forming a staggered layout.

In 2005, the station was modernised and received the new style that is used on all RET metrostations. The station is not equipped with ticket barriers.
