= Romeynshof metro station =

Metro station in Rotterdam, Netherlands

Romeynshof
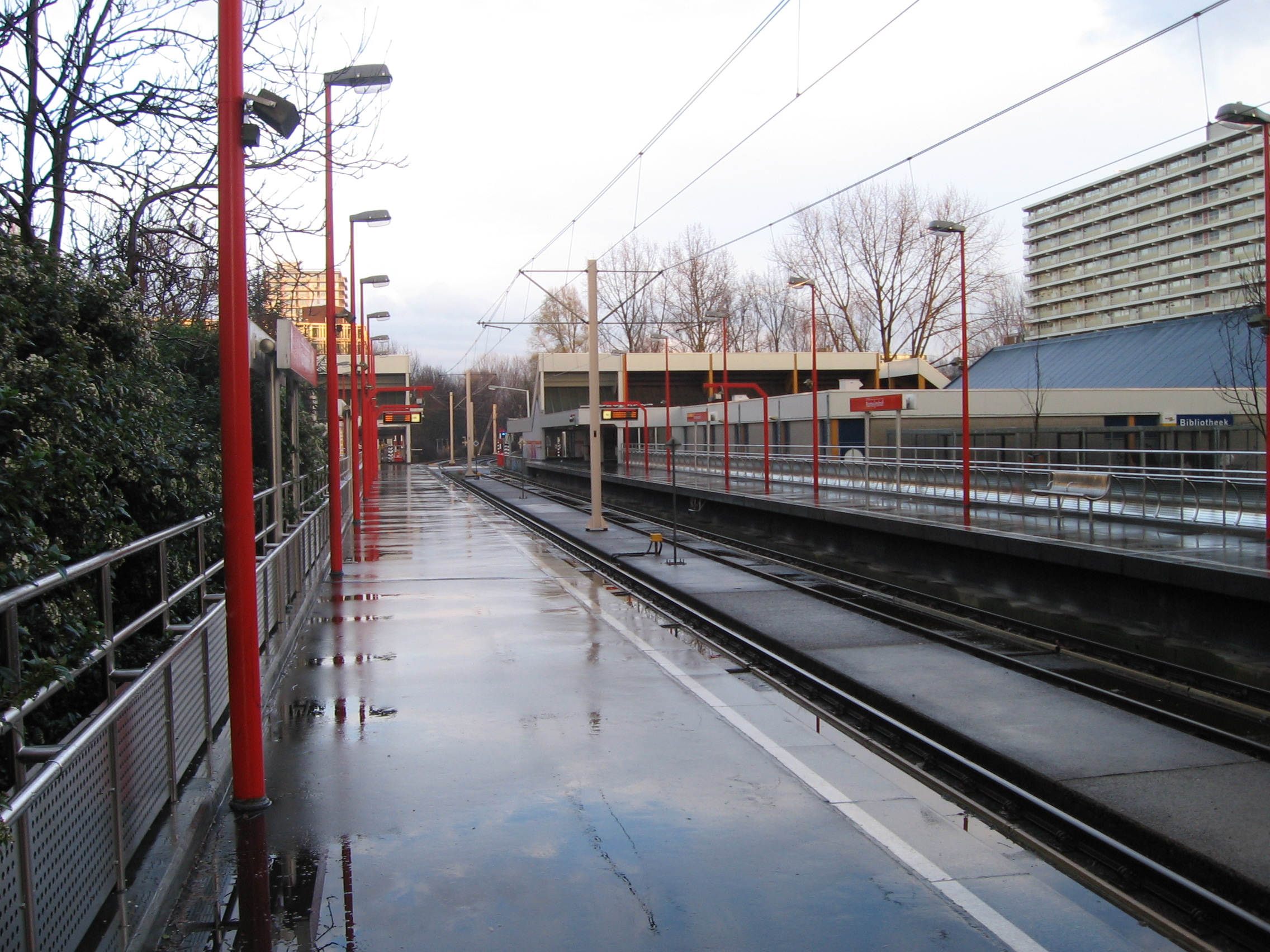

General information
- Coordinates: 51°57′42″N 4°32′34″E
- System: Rotterdam Metro station
- Owner: RET
- Platforms: Side platforms
- Tracks: 2

History
- Opened: 1983

Services
Preceding station	Rotterdam Metro	Following station
Graskruid towards Vlaardingen West	Line A Not on evenings and early weekend mornings	Binnenhof Terminus
Graskruid towards Kralingse Zoom	Line A Evenings and early weekend mornings only	Binnenhof Terminus
Location

Romeynshof is a station on line A of the Rotterdam Metro system, and is situated in Rotterdam-Ommoord. It is located between Graskruid station, where lines A and B split, and Binnenhof station, the northern terminus of line A.

Trains coming from Binnenhof will depart for Schiedam Centrum for most of the day. After 5 pm their destination will be Kralingse Zoom and at night Alexander.

This station was opened on 28 May 1983 when the East-West Line (also formerly the Caland line) was extended from its previous terminus Capelsebrug. It is on a section of line that uses overhead wires to provide traction power.
