= Schenkel metro station =

Metro station in Rotterdam, Netherlands

Schenkel
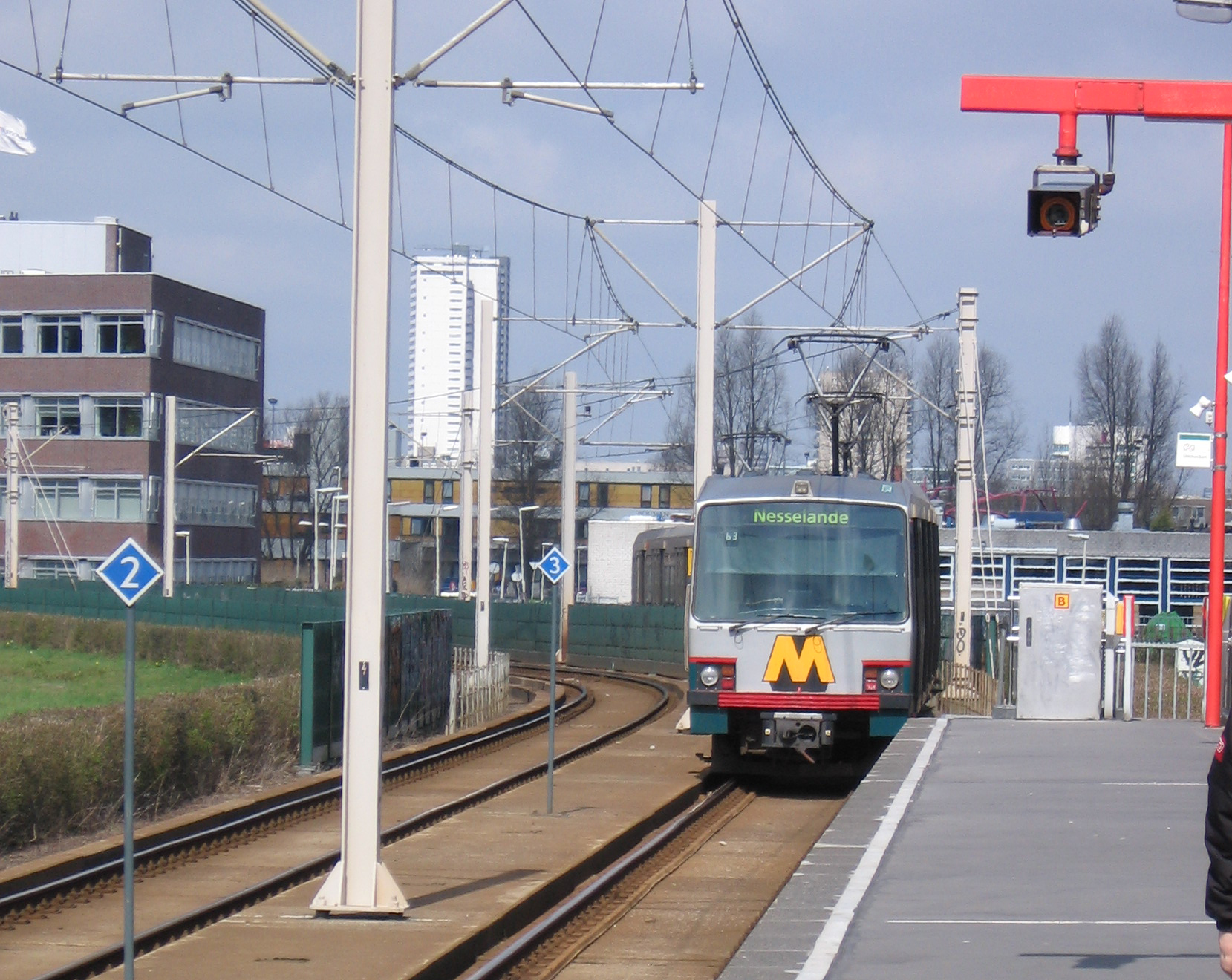

General information
- Coordinates: 51°55′55″N 4°33′49″E
- System: Rotterdam Metro station
- Owner: RET
- Platforms: Side platforms
- Tracks: 2

History
- Opened: 1983

Services
Preceding station	Rotterdam Metro	Following station
Capelsebrug towards Vlaardingen West	Line A Not on evenings and early weekend mornings	Prinsenlaan towards Binnenhof
Capelsebrug towards Kralingse Zoom	Line A Evenings and early weekend mornings only	Prinsenlaan towards Binnenhof
Capelsebrug towards Hoek van Holland Strand	Line B	Prinsenlaan towards Nesselande
Location

Schenkel is a subway station on Rotterdam Metro lines A and B, and is situated in the northeastern part of Rotterdam, in the borough Prins Alexander. The station is named after a neighbourhood in nearby Capelle aan den IJssel, situated to the southeast of the subway station.

This station was opened on 28 May 1983 when the East-West Line (also formerly the Caland line) was extended from its previous terminus Capelsebrug. Note that this section uses overhead wires to provide traction power.

At Schenkel station, passengers can transfer to RET-busline 37.
