= Oosterflank metro station =

Metro station in Rotterdam, Netherlands

Oosterflank
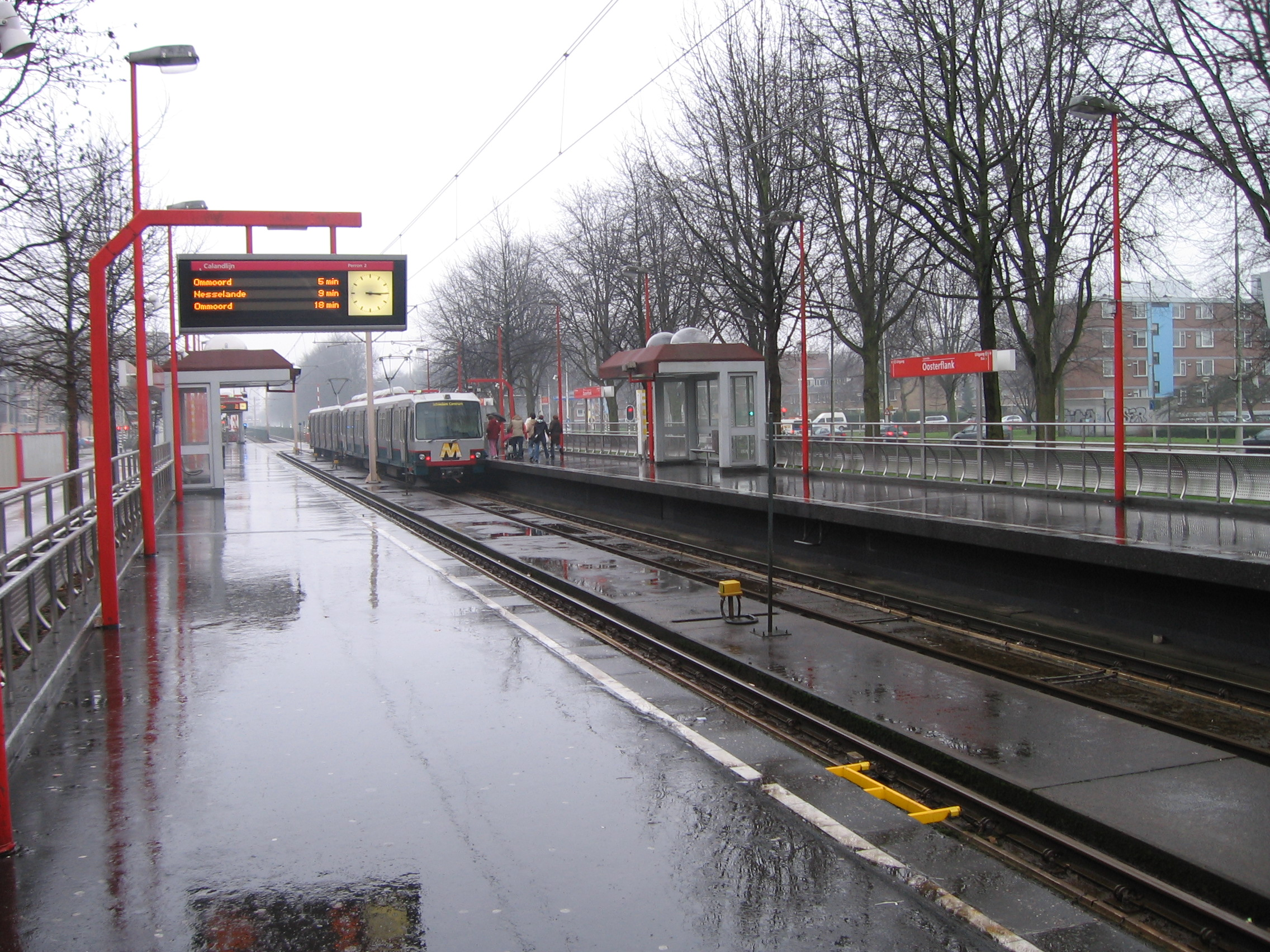

General information
- Coordinates: 51°56′45″N 4°33′16″E
- System: Rotterdam Metro station
- Owner: RET
- Platforms: Side platforms
- Tracks: 2

History
- Opened: 1983

Services
Preceding station	Rotterdam Metro	Following station
Prinsenlaan towards Vlaardingen West	Line A Not on evenings and early weekend mornings	Alexander towards Binnenhof
Prinsenlaan towards Kralingse Zoom	Line A Evenings and early weekend mornings only	Alexander towards Binnenhof
Prinsenlaan towards Hoek van Holland Strand	Line B	Alexander towards Nesselande
Location

Oosterflank is a station on Rotterdam Metro lines A and B, and is situated in the northeastern part of Rotterdam, in Prins Alexander borough. The station serves the Oosterflank neighbourhood, situated just east of the station.

This station was opened on 28 May 1983 when the East-West Line (also formerly the Caland line) was extended from its previous terminus Capelsebrug and is on a section that uses overhead wires to provide traction power.

There is interchange with RET-buslines 36 and 37.
