= Oostplein metro station =

Metro station in Rotterdam, the Netherlands

Oostplein
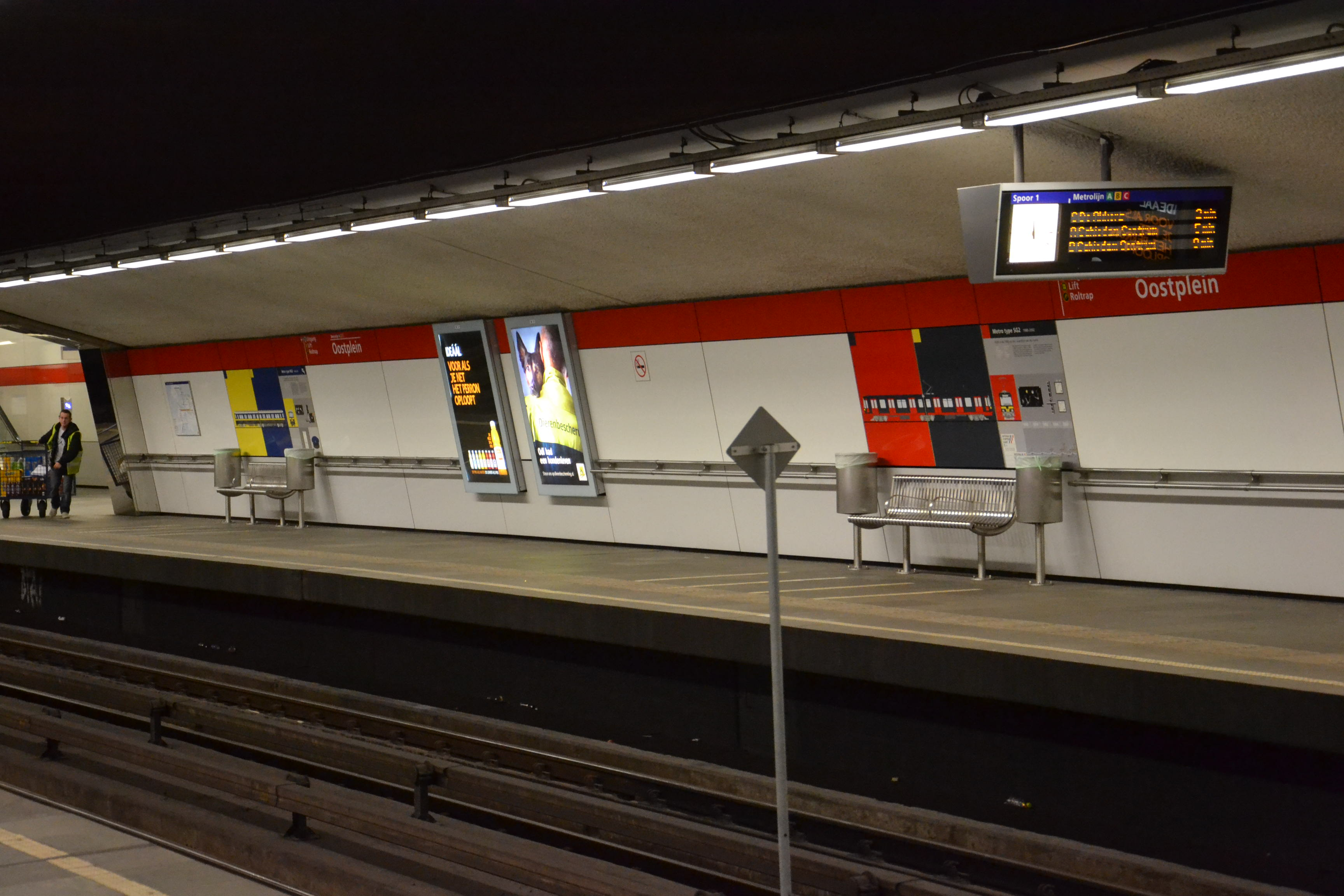

General information
- Coordinates: 51°55′23″N 4°29′49″E
- System: Rotterdam Metro station
- Owner: RET
- Tracks: 2

Construction
- Structure type: Underground

History
- Opened: 1982

Services
Preceding station	Rotterdam Metro	Following station
Blaak towards Vlaardingen West	Line A Not on evenings and early weekend mornings	Gerdesiaweg towards Binnenhof
Blaak towards Hoek van Holland Strand	Line B	Gerdesiaweg towards Nesselande
Blaak towards De Akkers	Line C	Gerdesiaweg towards De Terp
Location

Oostplein is an underground station in the city of Rotterdam, located on the Rotterdam Metro lines A, B, and C. The station opened on 10 May 1982, the same date that the East-West Line (also formerly called the Caland line), of which it is a part, was opened.

The station is located near the border between the city center and Kralingen-Crooswijk borough, and is below the former site of the De Noord mill. Overground people can get on at RET-Rotterdam tram lines 7 and 21.

Previous	Line	Next
Kipstraat	Tram 7 Willemsplein - Erasmus Universiteit	Boezemweg
Burg. Van Walsumweg	Tram 21; Harreweg - De Esch	Willem Ruyslaan
