= Gerdesiaweg metro station =

Metro station in Rotterdam, the Netherlands

Gerdesiaweg
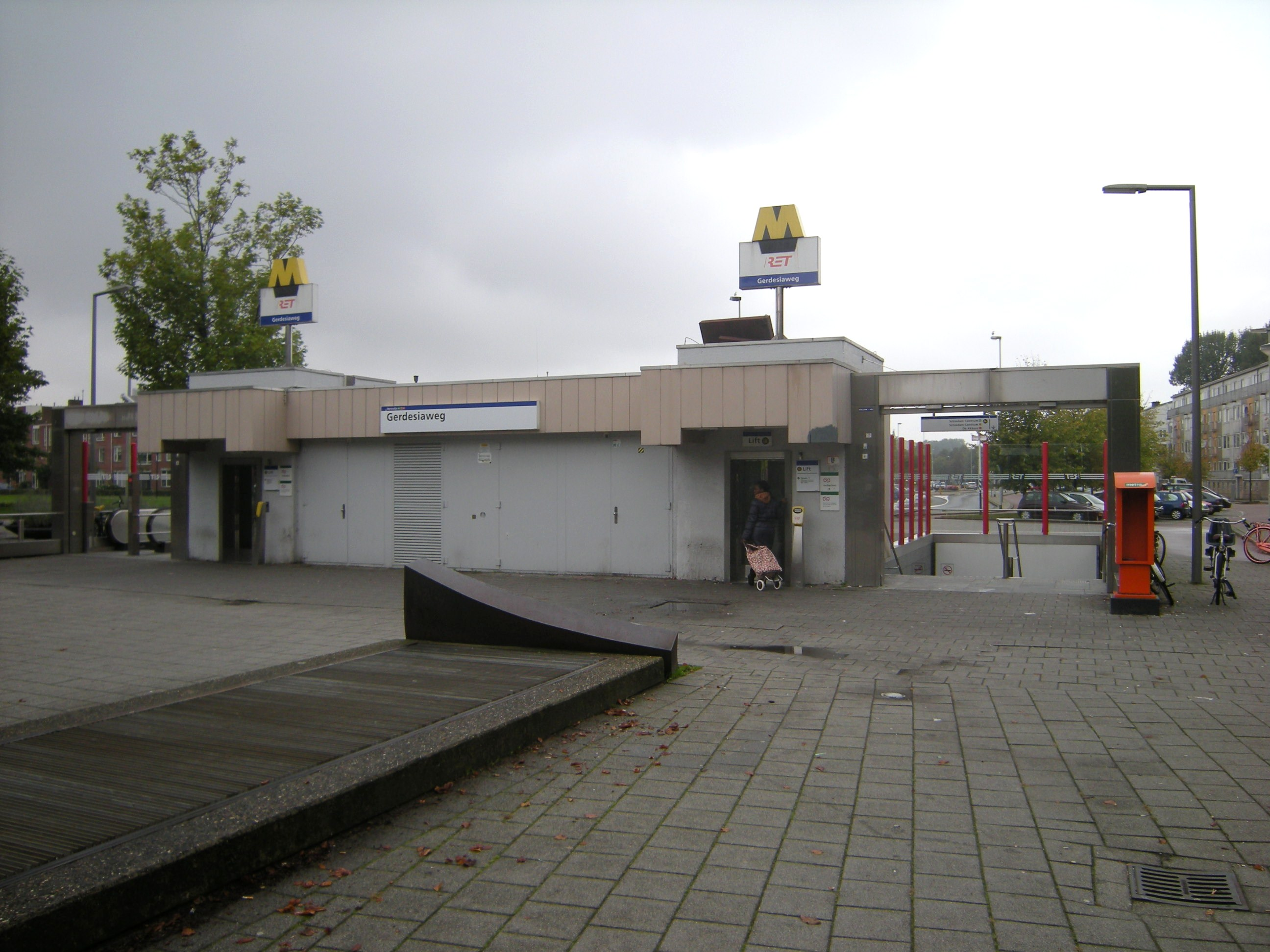

General information
- Coordinates: 51°55′33″N 4°30′22″E
- System: Rotterdam Metro station
- Owner: RET
- Platforms: Side platforms
- Tracks: 2

Construction
- Structure type: Underground

History
- Opened: 1982

Services
Preceding station	Rotterdam Metro	Following station
Oostplein towards Vlaardingen West	Line A Not on evenings and early weekend mornings	Voorschoterlaan towards Binnenhof
Oostplein towards Hoek van Holland Strand	Line B	Voorschoterlaan towards Nesselande
Oostplein towards De Akkers	Line C	Voorschoterlaan towards De Terp
Location

Gerdesiaweg is an underground subway station in the city of Rotterdam, located on the Rotterdam Metro lines A, B, and C. The station opened on 10 May 1982, the same date that the East-West Line (also formerly called the Caland line), of which it is a part, was opened.

The station is located to the east of the city center, in the borough of Kralingen-Crooswijk.
