= Voorschoterlaan metro station =

Subway station in Rotterdam, the Netherlands

Voorschoterlaan
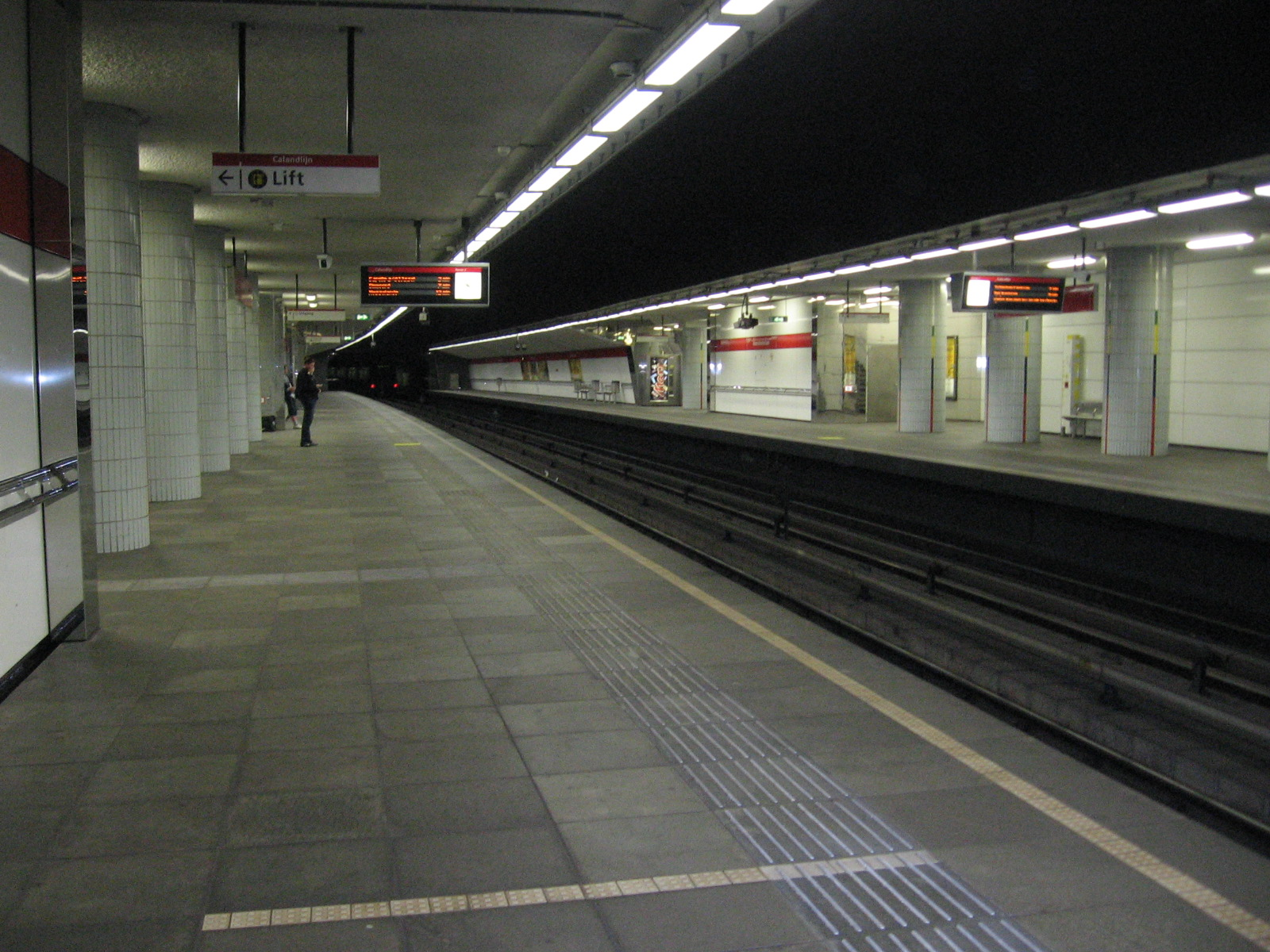

General information
- Coordinates: 51°55′30″N 4°30′47″E
- System: Rotterdam Metro station
- Owner: RET
- Platforms: Side platforms
- Tracks: 2

Construction
- Structure type: Underground

History
- Opened: 1982

Services
Preceding station	Rotterdam Metro	Following station
Gerdesiaweg towards Vlaardingen West	Line A Not on evenings and early weekend mornings	Kralingse Zoom towards Binnenhof
Gerdesiaweg towards Hoek van Holland Strand	Line B	Kralingse Zoom towards Nesselande
Gerdesiaweg towards De Akkers	Line C	Kralingse Zoom towards De Terp
Location

Voorschoterlaan is an underground subway station in the city of Rotterdam, located on the Rotterdam Metro lines A, B, and C. The station opened on 10 May 1982, the same date that the East-West Line (also formerly called the Caland line), of which it is a part, was opened.

The station is located to the east of the city center, in the borough of Kralingen-Crooswijk. Overground people can get on at RET-Rotterdam tram line 7.

Previous	Line	Next
Mecklenburglaan	Tram 7 Willemsplein - Erasmus Universiteit	Essenlaan
