= Graskruid metro station =

Metro station in Rotterdam, the Netherlands

Graskruid
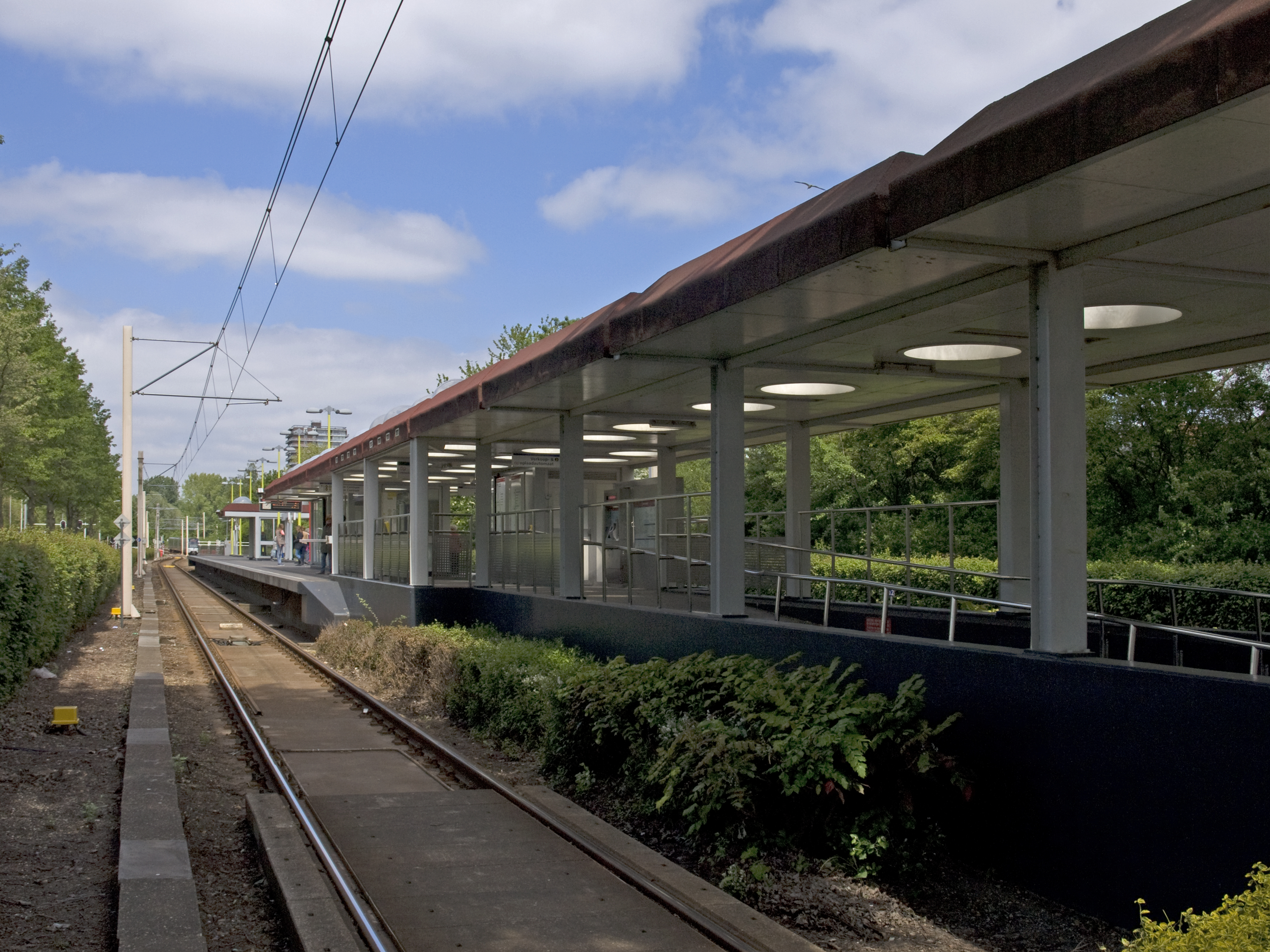
- The platform from the south

General information
- Coordinates: 51°57′26″N 4°32′58″E
- System: Rotterdam Metro station
- Owner: RET
- Platforms: Island platform
- Tracks: 2

History
- Opened: 1983

Services
Preceding station	Rotterdam Metro	Following station
Alexander towards Vlaardingen West	Line A Not on evenings and early weekend mornings	Romeynshof towards Binnenhof
Alexander towards Kralingse Zoom	Line A Evenings and early weekend mornings only	Romeynshof towards Binnenhof
Alexander towards Hoek van Holland Strand	Line B	Hesseplaats towards Nesselande
Location

Graskruid is a station on lines A and B of the Rotterdam Metro and is situated in the northeastern part of Rotterdam. At Graskruid station, the track splits into the two station short Line A branch and the longer Line B branch. The station consists of an island platform between two running tracks.

This station was opened on 28 May 1983 when the East-West Line (also formerly called Caland line) was extended from its previous terminus Capelsebrug.
