= Arjan Erkel =

Kidnapped Dutch medical aid worker

- Born: Peter-Arjan Erkel; March 9, 1970; Prins Alexander, Netherlands
- Occupation: Medical aid worker
- Known for: Being kidnapped by gunmen during the Second Chechen War

Peter-Arjan Erkel (born 9 March 1970 in Prins Alexander, Rotterdam) is a Dutch former medical aid worker who was head of the relief mission for Médecins Sans Frontières (MSF) in Dagestan, a constituent republic of Russia. His main task was caring for refugees fleeing from fighting in neighboring Chechnya.

== Disappearance ==
Erkel was abducted by three gunmen in Makhachkala on 12 August 2002. The insurgency phase of the Second Chechen War was still ongoing at the time, and Erkel writes in his own biography that he was guarded by "heavily armed muslim rebels", with whom he managed to have limited conversations during his abduction.

== Rescue ==
On 11 April 2004, Erkel was free again and appeared to be in reasonably good health. Originally, the Dutch government claimed that Erkel was rescued in a special operation conducted jointly by the Russian (Federal Security Service) FSB and local Dagestani police and that Arjan was slightly hurt in the storming of the hideout. The government eventually admitted that that was a lie and that they paid a 1 million euro ransom to free Erkel, but claimed that it didn't pay the ransom itself but on behalf of the organisation, claiming it was a loan that MSF had orally promised to pay back. MSF refutes this and in June 2004 the Dutch government announced a lawsuit. This is the first time a national government has sued an aid agency.

== Aftermath ==
MSF has suspended its operations in Chechnya several times over kidnappings of its personnel.

In March 2007 the Dutch government lost the case: MSF does not have to pay back the 770,000 euro the government has paid, and gets 45,000 euro back of the 230,000 euro it paid through the government. The government appealed; the appeal was lost in February 2008. The Dutch government appealed again at the Federal Tribunal in Lausanne and won the case, forcing MSF to pay back 270,000 euro to the Dutch Government.

== See also ==
- Active measures
- List of kidnappings
- List of solved missing person cases (2000s)
