= Ommoord =

Neighborhood in Rotterdam, The Netherlands

Coordinates: 51°57′44″N 4°33′02″E

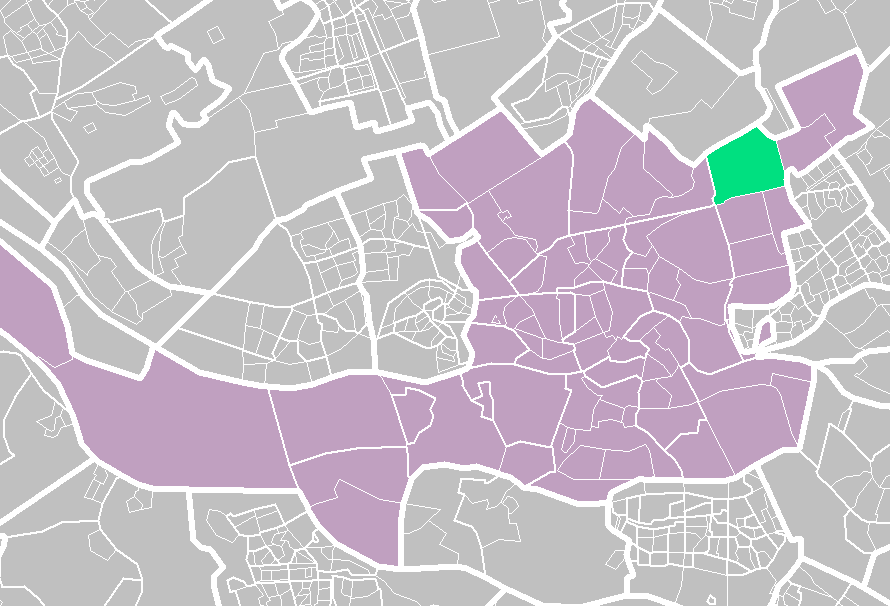
Ommoord (light green) within Rotterdam (purple)

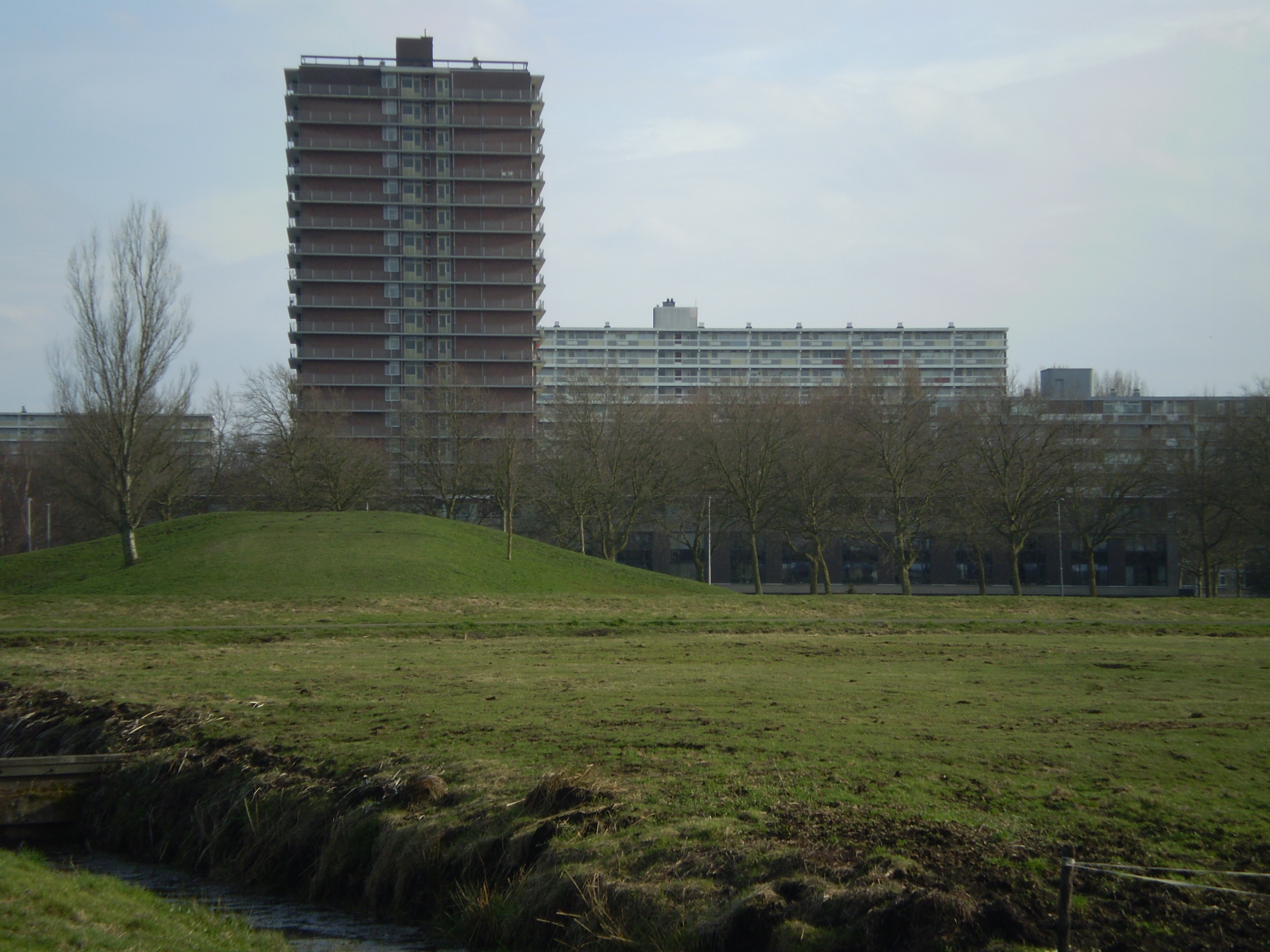
View towards high rise buildings in Ommoord, standing on Ommoordseveld, a protected field next to the farm for children

Ommoord is a neighbourhood in the borough Prins Alexander, part of the municipality of Rotterdam, South Holland, the Netherlands. Ommoord is surrounded by the neighbourhoods Zevenkamp, Het Lage Land, and Terbregge. It has around 25,000 inhabitants across 12,500 households. Ommoord shares postal codes 3068 (south of metro line) and 3069 (north of metro line) with Zevenkamp.

The river Rotte flows along the northern border of the Ommoord neighborhood and the former borough of Prins Alexander. Two recreational areas lie on the other side of Rotte river, Lage Bergsche Bos and the area around the artificial ski mountain, based on a former landfill, belonging to Bergschenhoek, now part of the combined municipal council for Lansingerland.

== Local administration ==
Ommoord used to be governed by the borough of Prins Alexander, but the system of deelgemeentes (boroughs) has been abolished in March 2014 and powers have been returned to the central administration in Rotterdam town hall. Neighborhood committees have replaced borough administrations, but with very limited budget, the neighborhood committee for Ommoord has become window dressing, if not completely irrelevant.

== Neighborhoods ==
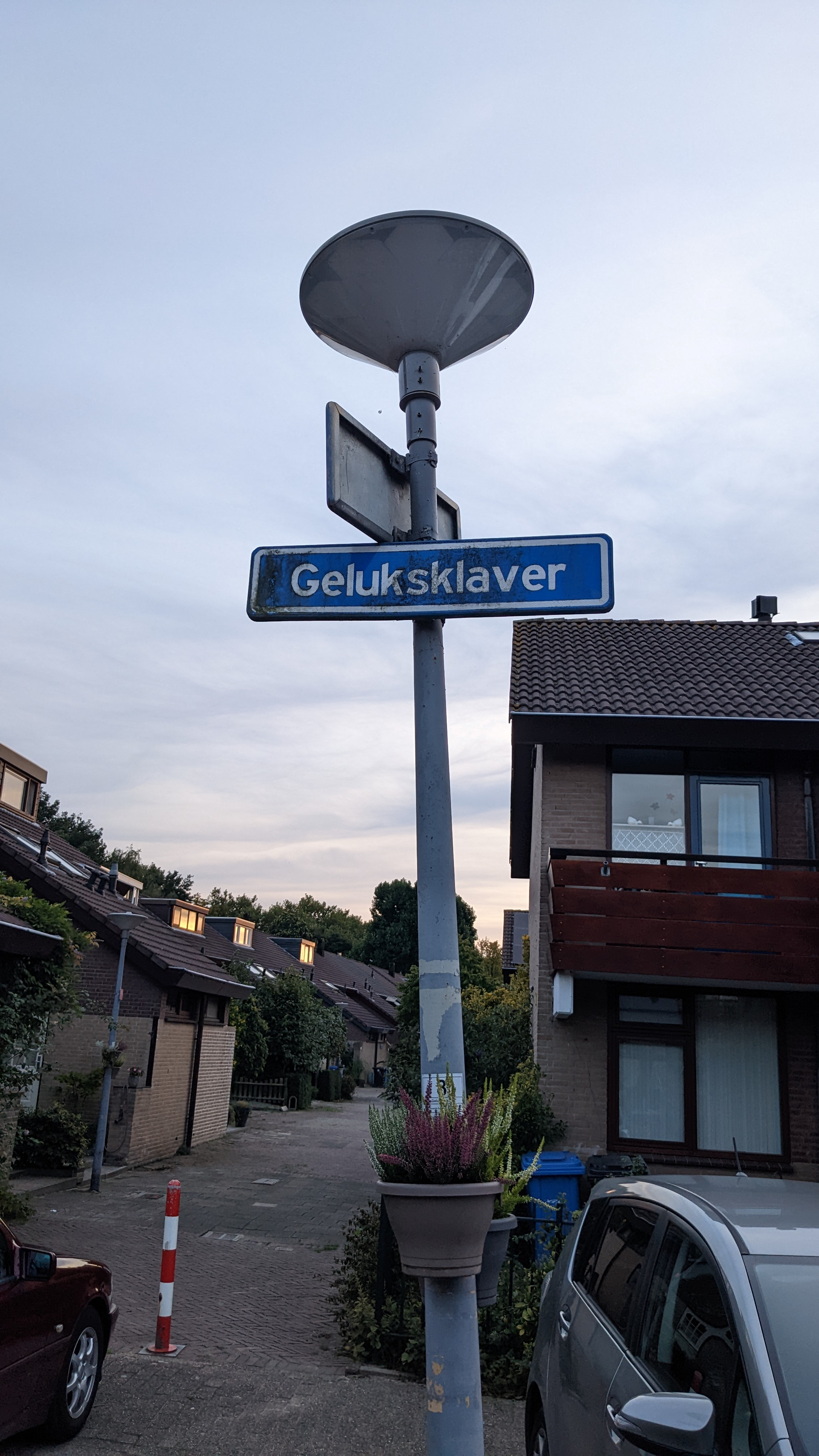
Street sign of Geluksklaver (lucky clover), street in Ommoord, with lower houses

Ommoord has 15 neighbourhoods: Bloemenbuurt (flower-neighbourhood), Bremmenbuurt (broom), Distelbuurt (thistle), Doornenbuurt (thorns), Grasbuurt (grass), Heidebuurt (heather), Bessenbuurt (berries), Klaverbuurt (clover), Kruidenbuurt (herbs), Middengebied-West (Middle area-West), Middengebied-Centrum (Middle area-Center), Middengebied-Oost (Middle area-East), Mossenbuurt (moss), Rozenbuurt (roses), and the Varenbuurt (fern).

There are official names for neighborhoods in Ommoord like Machielenkamp, Willenskamp, Zwansnesse, Buitenlust, Baersmeer, Romeijnshof-Noord, Boekholt, Hoogerbrugge and Keizershof, but these names have never been in popular use. For streets within the high rise area, people often refer to the closest metro station. Those who live in a house refer to plants, if they do not mention their exact street name.

Four avenues surround a middle area where high rise buildings (8, 14 or 20 floors) dominate the urban landscape. Much of Ommoord's social housing can be found in flats in this middle area, surrounded by President Wilsonweg (north side), Martin Luther Kingweg (east side), President Rooseveltweg (south side) and John Mottweg (west side). The two metro lines run through the centre line of this middle area.

Many streets in the middle area of Ommoord have been named after Nobel prize winners, most of them ending in -plaats, meaning square, but often being just parking lots. All streets named after plants lack the 'straat' (street) in their name. People living in low houses in streets named after plants tend to be mostly home owners, richer than people renting flats in the central area of Ommoord.

Ommoord was built at the beginning of the 1970s. Until well into the 1990s, lower class and middle-class people were living rather mixed in the high rise buildings in Ommoord's middle area. Increases in rent for people with higher incomes and the obligation to provide housing to refugees, forced upon social housing corporations, has caused a shift in population of flats, increasing the number of lower class inhabitants.

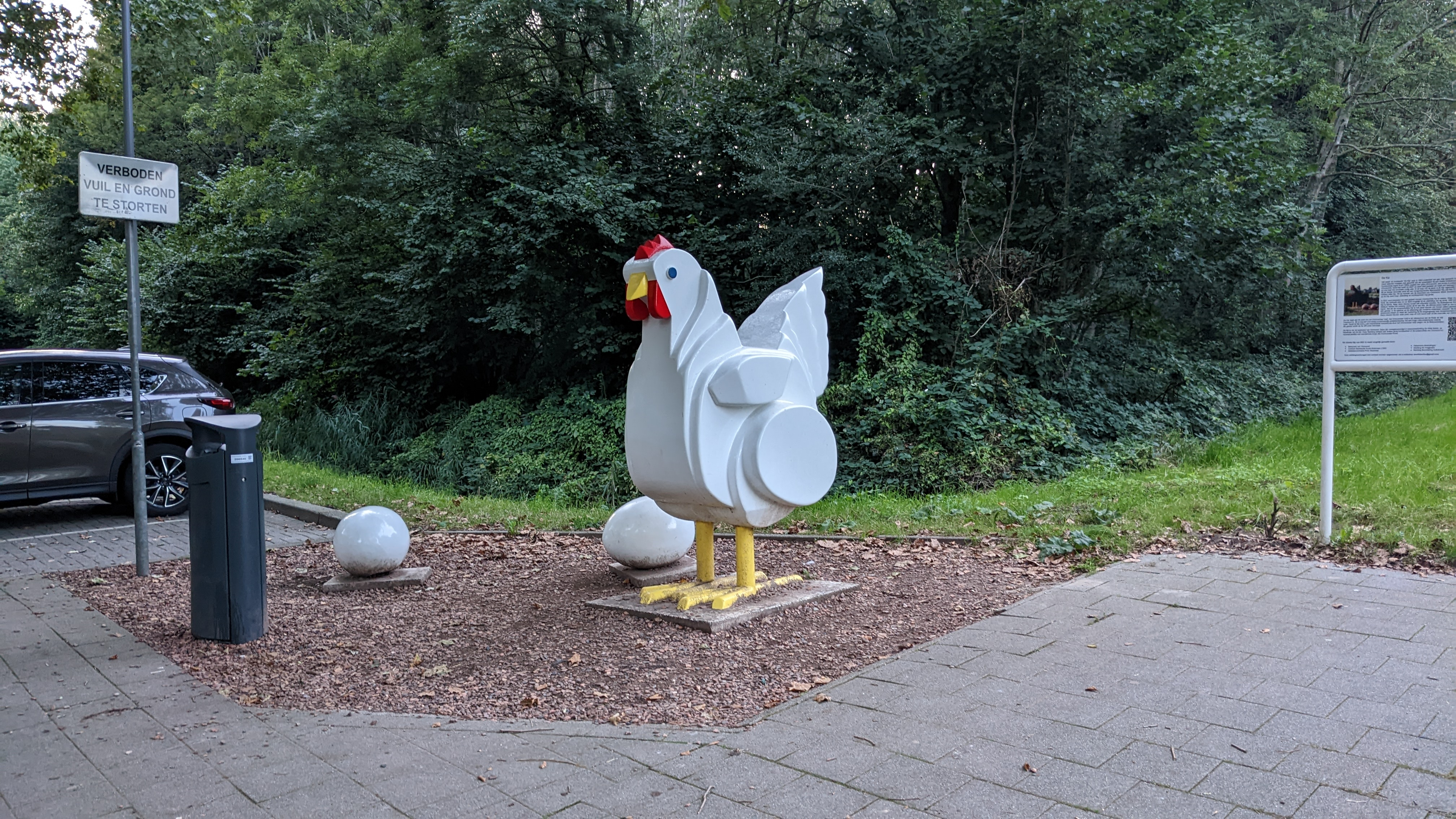
Sculpture of wooden chicken, signalling start of walkway to Ommoord's farm for children

De Ommoordse kip, a large wooden chicken, is positioned next to a parking lot at President Wilsonweg. It started as advertisement for De Blijde Wei (in English: the happy meadow), a farm with animals meant to visit with children, but de Kip has become a monument in its own right, adopted by the community, after having suffered from football hooligans painting it orange for Euro and world football tournaments.

Next to the metro station lies community building 'Romeynshof', housing a library. Many clubs and organizations forming the social infrastructure of Ommoord neighborhood have been chased out of their rooms in the Romeynshof when the central town administration started to charge commercial rents to volunteers who could not afford this. The Covid pandemic gave them the last blow. Romeynshof will be demolished and rebuilt.

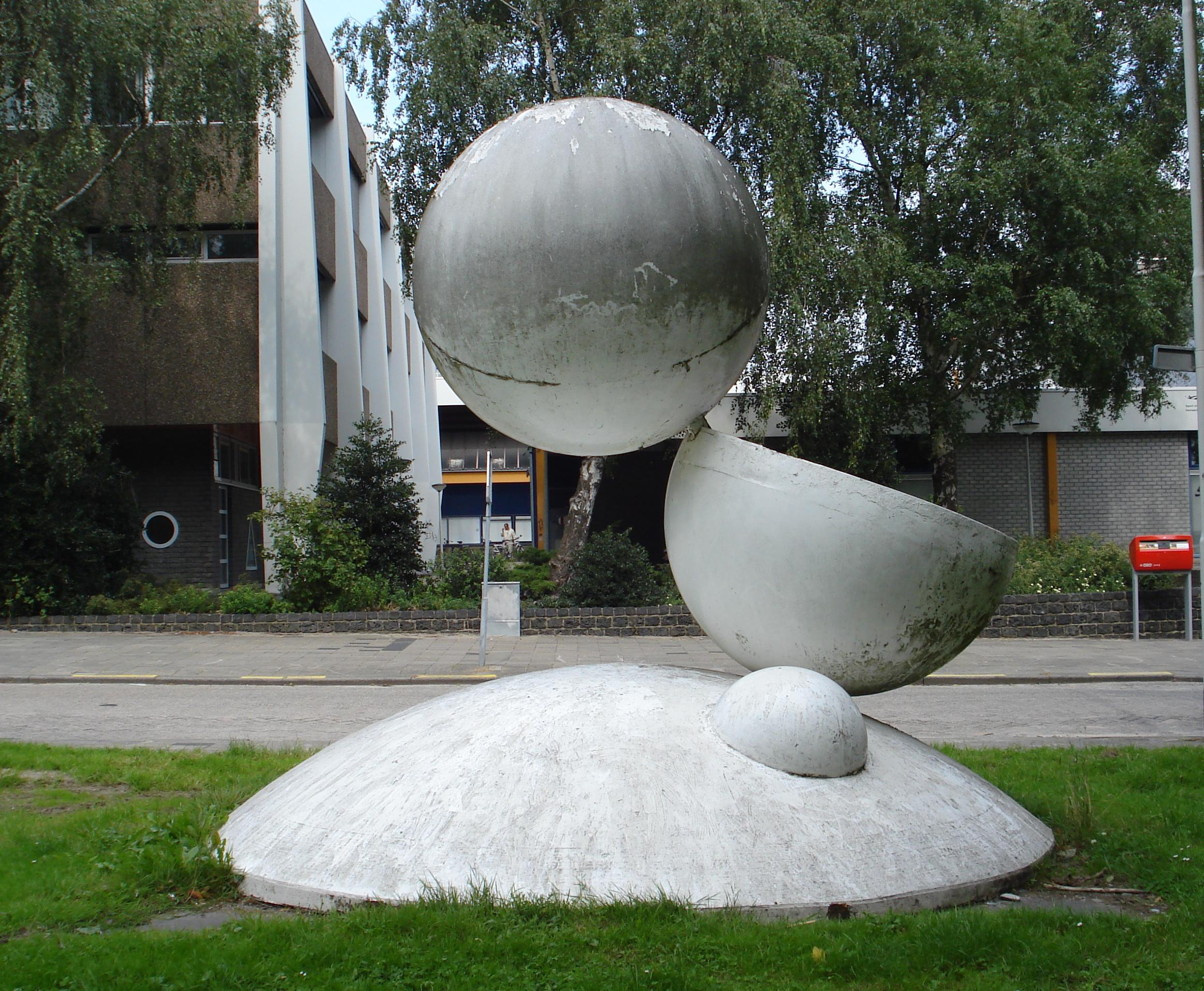
Sculpture of white bloodcells, opposite to health centre and library in Ommoord, before it got set on fire, forgotten and rebuilt

Ommoord has six supermarkets and two shopping centres, Binnenhof, on the western side of the middle area and Hesseplaats, on the eastern side of the middle area. An even larger shopping centre is next to Prins Alexander railway station, just outside of Ommoord. A market is held every Wednesday on the west end of Hesseplaats, but its popularity is declining, as Ommoord's population is changing.

== Transport ==
=== Public transport ===
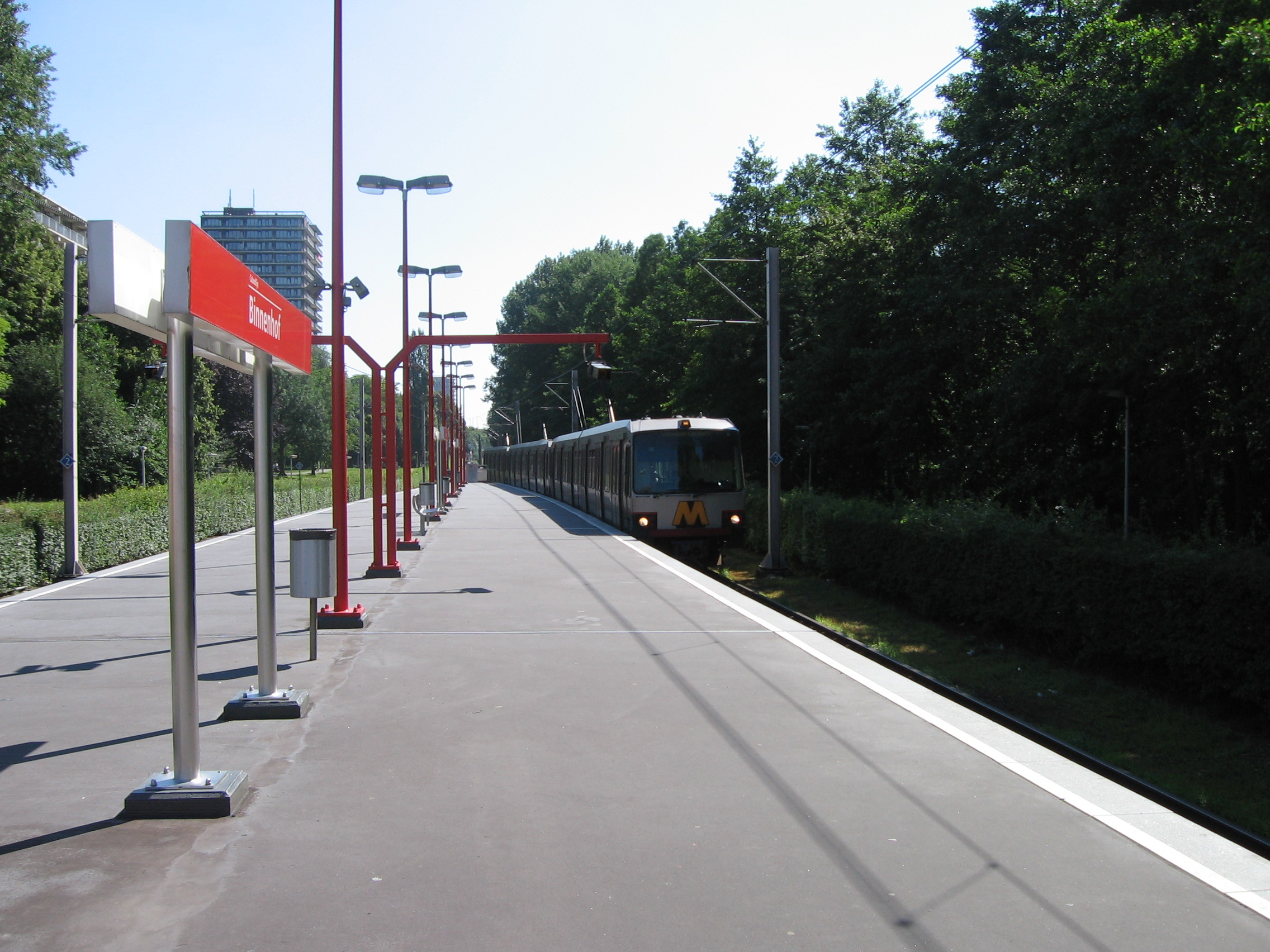
Metro terminus at Binnenhof

Two buslines extended into Ommoord: 34 en 35. Bus line 34 was made part of bus line 95 and lo longer exists. Bus line 35 still exists in 2023, but with more limited service hours than before the Corona pandemic.

The Calandlijn line of the Rotterdam subway extends into Ommoord and has 4 stations in it:

- Graskruid (both Ommoord and Nesselande branches)
- Romeynshof (Ommoord branch)
- Binnenhof (terminus for Ommoord branch)
- Hesseplaats (Nesselande branch)

All metro stations and the metro lines lie above the ground and have level crossings, protected with signal equipment. Many accidents, some fatal, have happened in the past, when people started crossing the tracks after one metro train had passed, getting hit by a second train from the other direction, showing up from behind the first train. Signal equipment at level crossings has therefore been replaced.

Public transport in the Netherlands in general is no longer available for people who can only pay with cash money. Those who insist on paying with cash money should save up their 2 Euro-coins, walk (15 or 20 minutes) to Rotterdam Alexander station and buy a train ticket from the machine. From there you can travel to Rotterdam Centraal (10 minutes), Utrecht (30 minutes) and places beyond, or Amsterdam (70 minutes).

=== Road connections ===
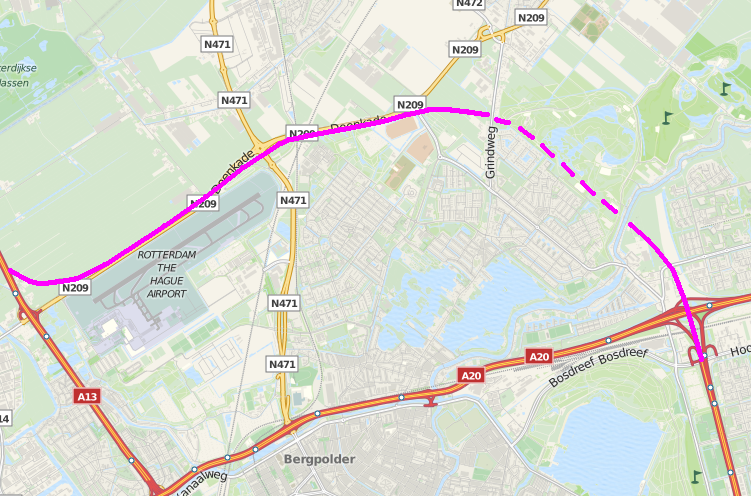
Construction project for extending A16 motorway and connecting it with A13, drawn on map of northern part of Rotterdam

Currently (2023) Ommoord can be accessed from A20 motorway (Hoek van Holland-Rotterdam-Gouda), at junction 16 for Prins Alexander. From there you take Capelseweg and end up at the eastern end of President Rooseveltweg. Those living on the western side of Ommoord may choose to exit A16 motorway (Breda-Rotterdam) at junction 27, take Terbregseweg and end up at the western end of President Rooseveltweg. Local traffic arriving from Rotterdam town centre will also enter Ommoord on this western side. Local traffic arriving from other parts of the former borough of Prins Alexander can enter Ommoord at Prins Alexanderlaan, an avenue that runs alongside the metro railway line. Bridges that cross Rotte river in Ommoord are only for cyclists and pedestrians. The closest bridge to cross Rotte river by car is Irenebrug, part of the Molenlaan, a heavily congested corridor linking Hillegersberg neighborhood with Terbregge and Ommoord.

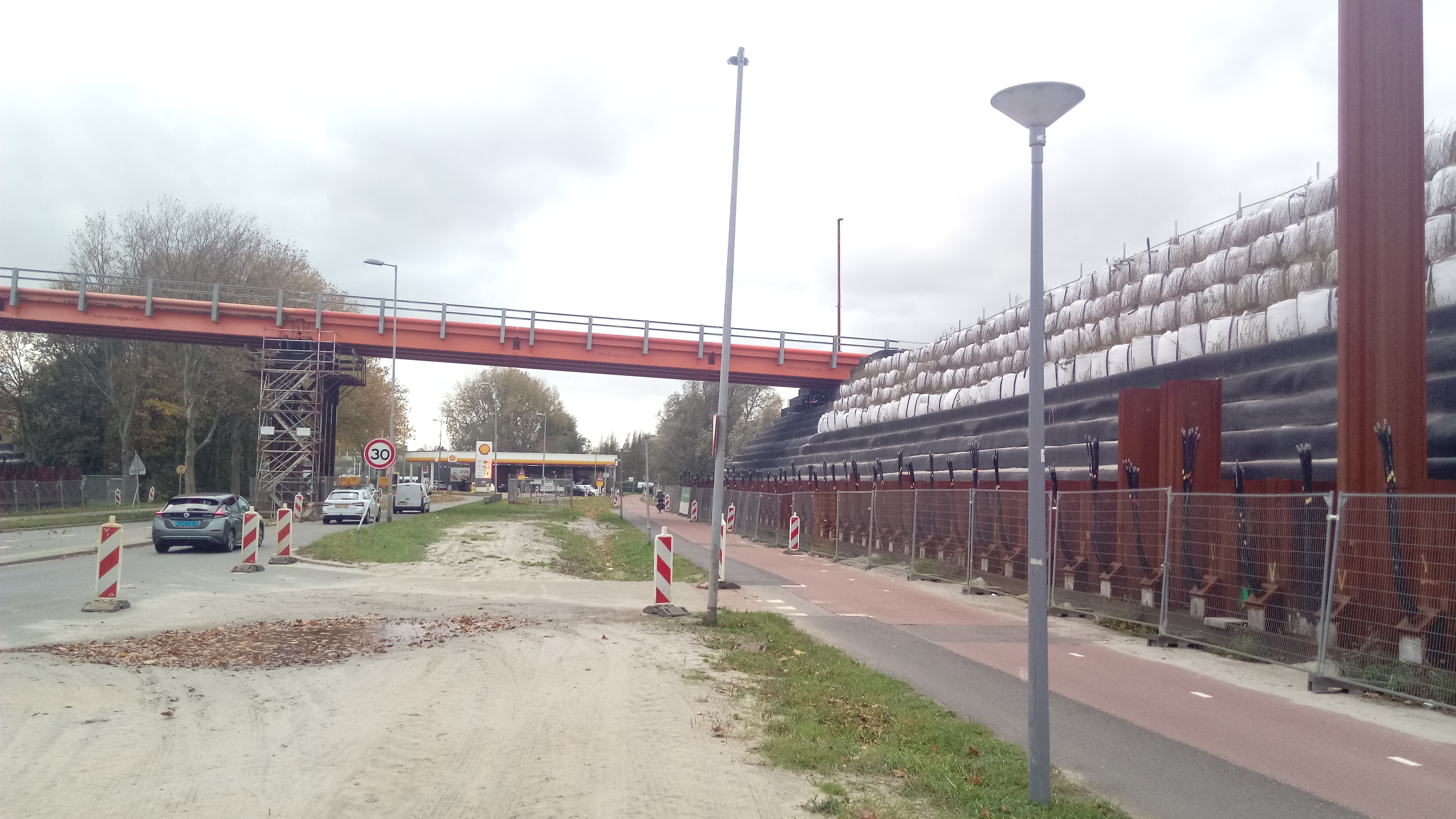
Construction project for extending A16 motorway, where A16 will cross the western end of President Rooseveltweg in Ommoord

Motorways A16 and A20 form a T-crossing until now (2023). There have been plans to build an extension for the A16 motorway since the 1970s, but for decades these plans never made it beyond a project on the Rotterdam city map. Eventually it has been decided that the A20 and A13 motorways, prone to traffic jams, leading to heavy traffic through the Molenlaan corridor will get a bypass, by extending A16 motorway from Terbregseplein around Hillegersberg and creating a direct link towards A13 motorway and Den Haag. Construction of this new motorway has started in 2019, after heated debate, as people in the roses and ferns streets will be suffering from more noise and air pollution after the A16 motorway will be opened for traffic in 2024 or 2025, as the tunnel for the new motorway ends at Terbregsepark. Half-junction 27 of A16, now only useful from/towards the south, will be extended and made complete with slip roads from/towards the north, improving travel times.

Just like many other cities in the Netherlands, most blocks of Ommoord are only accessible by car using the main road that goes around the outside of those blocks, while pedestrians and cyclists can take the shortest way, using their separate network of walkways and cycle paths, or following the lanes parallel to the metro lines. Travel times can be significantly shorter by bicycle than by car, especially when you include the time needed to find a free parking spot. During rush hour, it is often a faster solution to shop for groceries by bicycle, then to drive around by car and get stuck in traffic. Despite the infrastructure in Ommoord being perfect for cycling or walking, most elderly people and some women avoid to cycle or walk after dark, because they feel unsafe doing so. After office hours, some parking lots at high rise buildings tend to fill up beyond their maximum capacity, with people parking on illegal spots, just to avoid walking in the dark.
