= Kralingseveer =

Coordinates: 51°54′41″N 4°33′02″E

- Neighborhood of Rotterdam
- Interactive map of Kralingseveer
- Country: Netherlands
- Province: South Holland
- COROP: Rotterdam
- Borough: Prins Alexander
- Time zone: UTC+1 (CET)

Kralingseveer is a small town of Rotterdam, Netherlands.
