= Prinsenland =

Coordinates: 51°56′4″N 4°32′55″E

- Neighborhood of Rotterdam
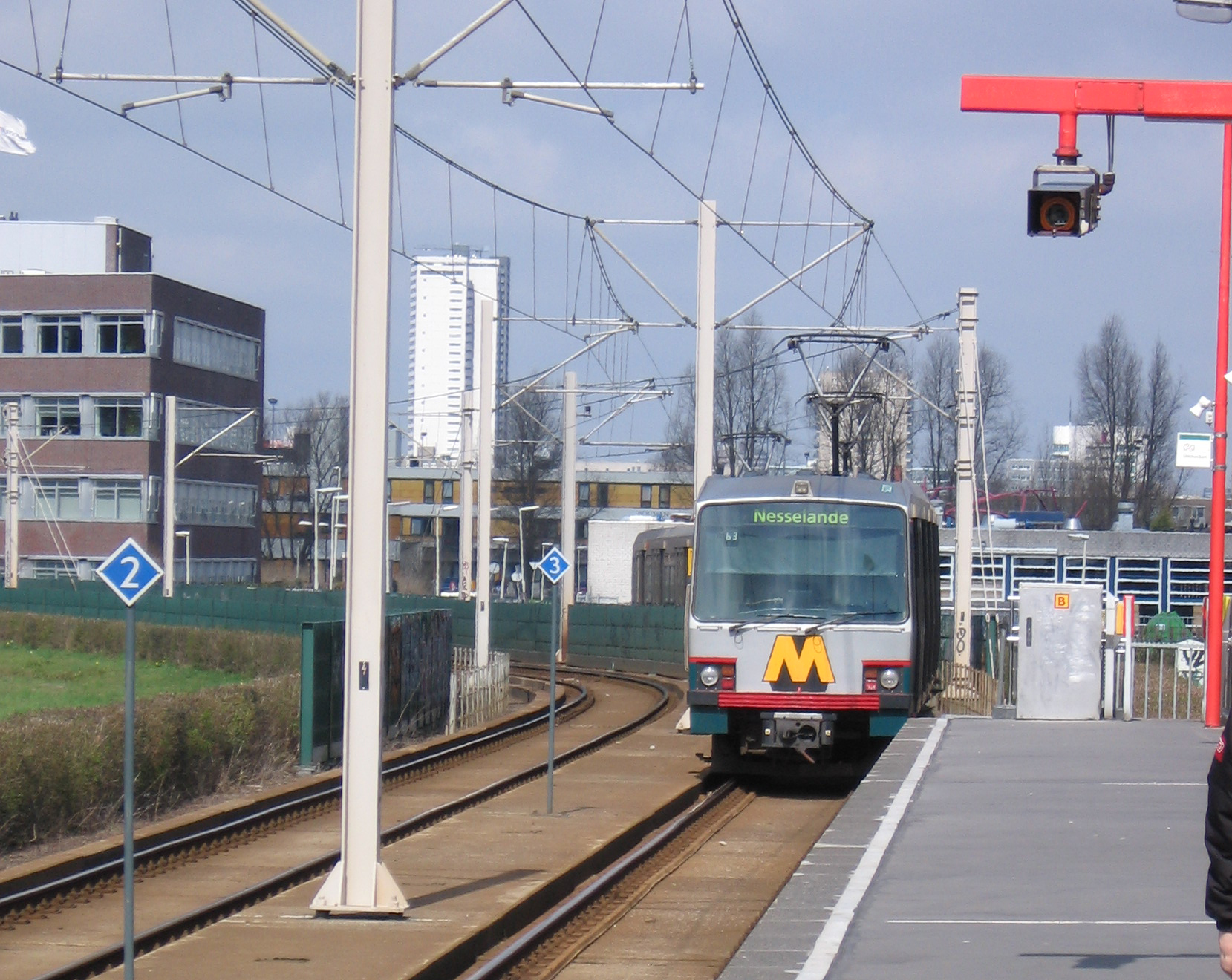
- Metrostation Schenkel
- Interactive map of Prinsenland
- Country: Netherlands
- Province: South Holland
- COROP: Rotterdam
- Borough: Prins Alexander
- Time zone: UTC+1 (CET)

Prinsenland is a neighborhood of Rotterdam, Netherlands.

The north of the neighborhood was built in the 1960s, at the same time as the adjacent neighborhood Het Lage Land. The rest of the neighborhood was built in several stages in the 1990s.

It consists of many different types of housing (flats, apartments, row-houses) surrounding the urban park Prinsenpark. In the Prinsenpark there is a cemetery, skate park, and a lake, which contains the monument to the lowest point in the Netherlands, the Vierkant eiland in de plas (Square Island in the Lake) build in 1996.
