= Oosterflank =

Coordinates: 51°56′35″N 4°33′34″E

- Neighborhood
- Interactive map of Oosterflank
- Country: Netherlands
- Province: South Holland
- COROP: Rotterdam
- Borough: Prins Alexander
- Time zone: UTC+1 (CET)

Oosterflank is a neighborhood of Rotterdam, Netherlands. It has a neighborhood council and a metro station.
