= Nesselande =

Neighborhood in Rotterdam, The Netherlands

Coordinates: 51.979120°N 4.586150°E

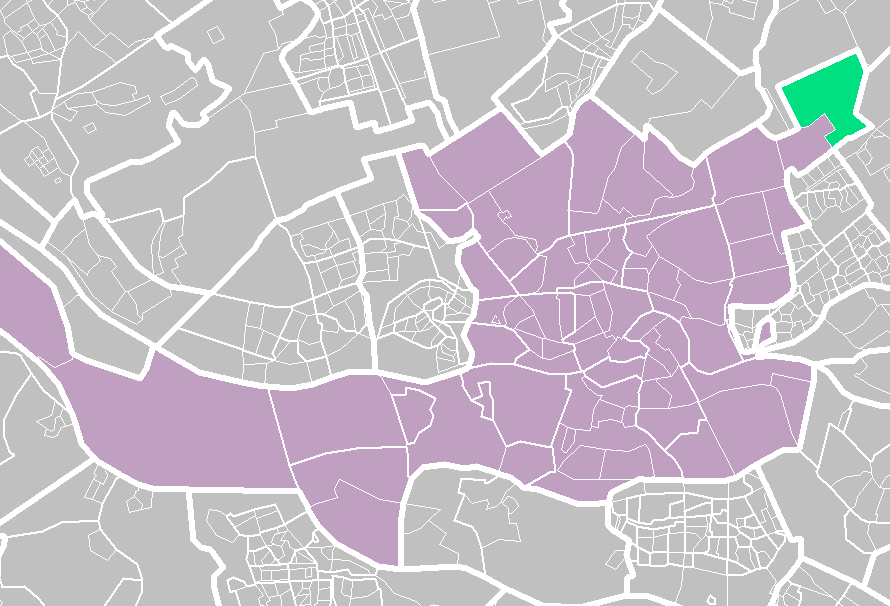
Nesselande (light green) within Rotterdam (purple).

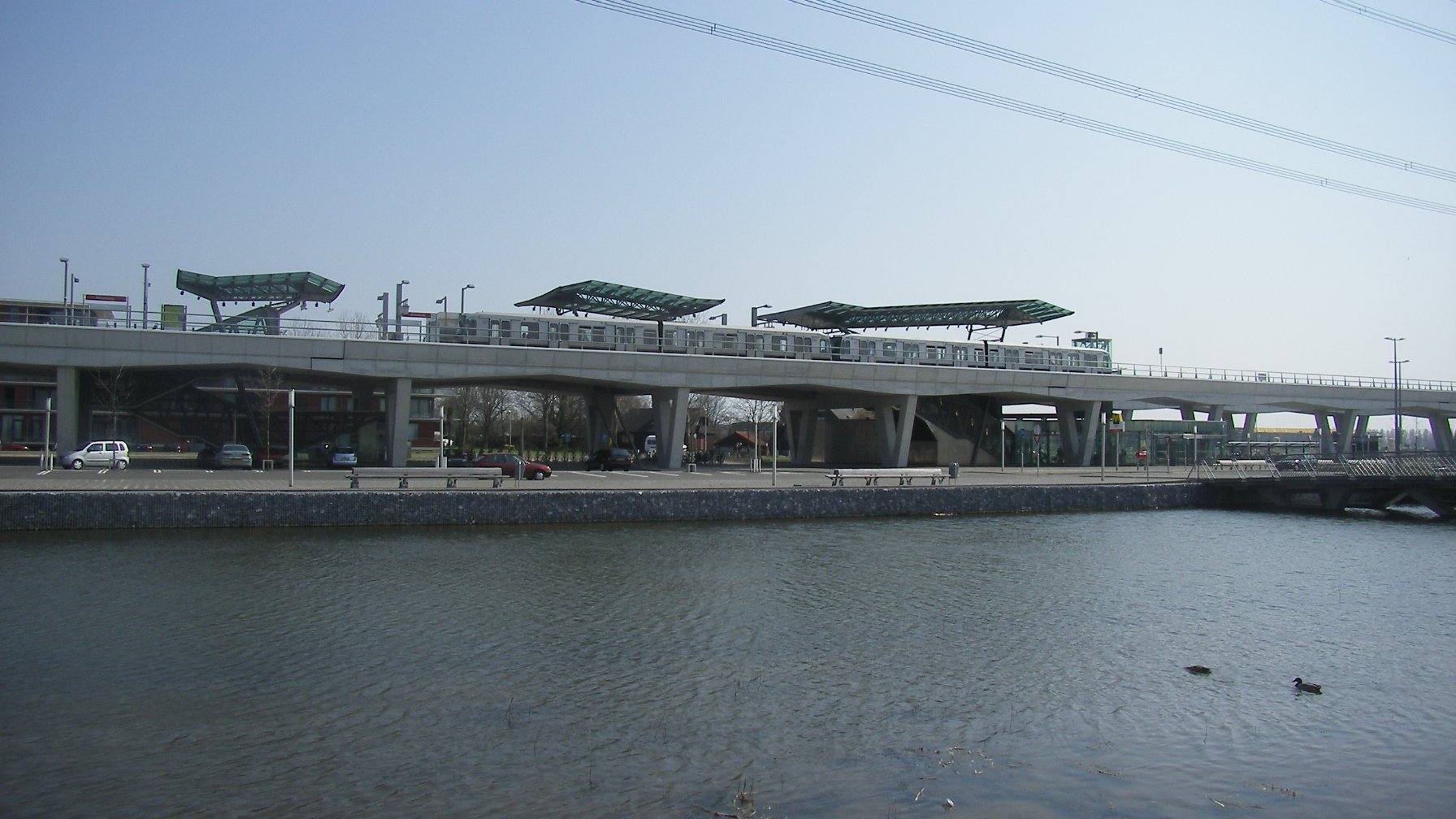
Nesselande metro station

Nesselande is a neighbourhood of Rotterdam, South Holland, the Netherlands and is a new extension on the east side of the city. It is part of the borough of Prins Alexander, formerly Zevenhuizen-Moerkapelle.

Nesselande consists of three development areas: Tuinstad, Badplaats and Waterwijk. On the south side, located near the A20 motorway, there is a modest business park which forms a logical buffer between the motorway and the housing. Within the new development, an ecological park known as Rietveldpark provides for natural elements.

Line B of the Rotterdam Metro was extended to the area in 2005.
