= Rotterdam Alexander station =

Railway station in Rotterdam, Netherlands

Rotterdam Alexander
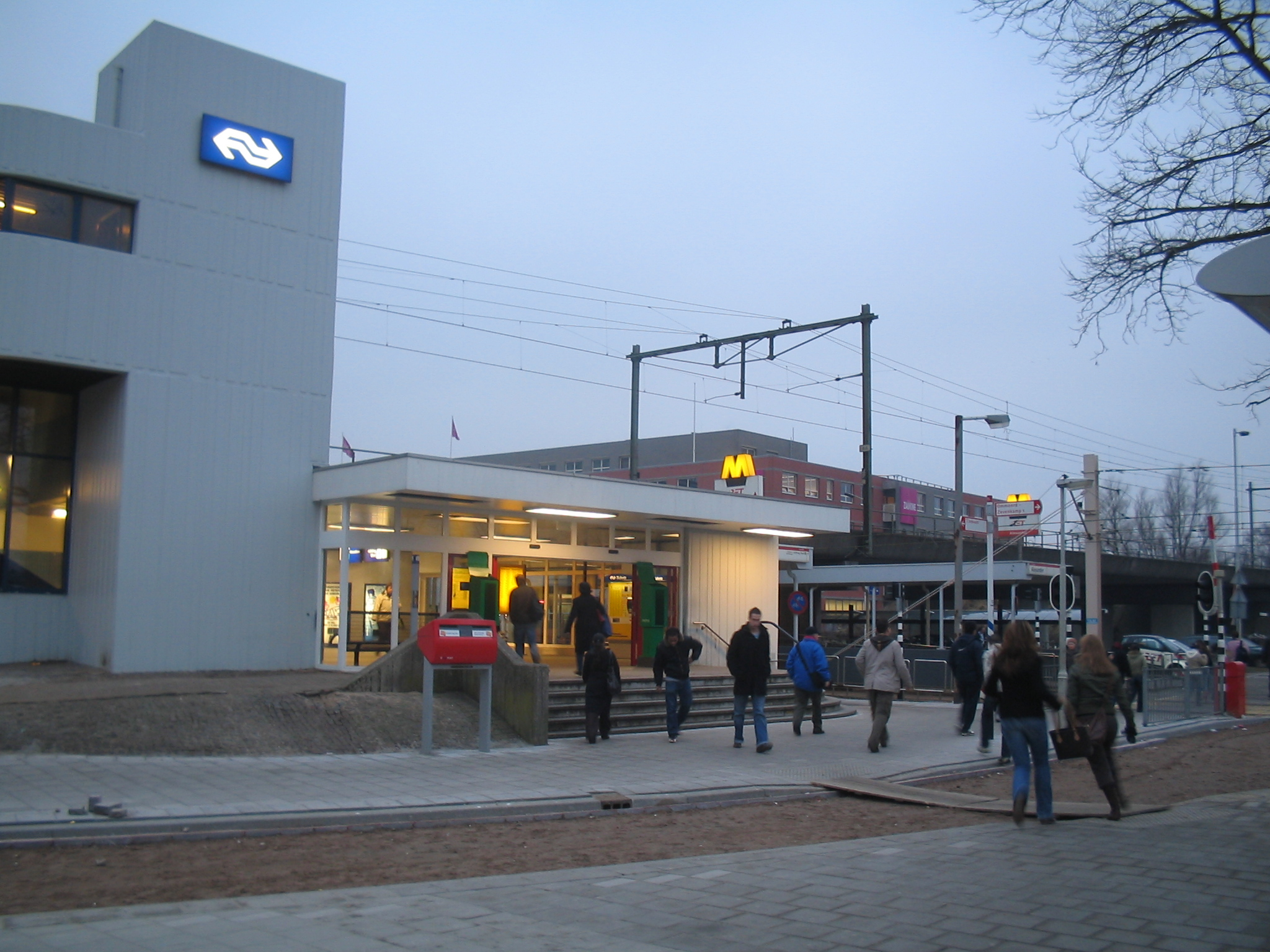
- Entrance of Rotterdam Alexander

General information
- Location: Netherlands
- Coordinates: 51°57′7″N 4°33′10″E
- Line: Utrecht–Rotterdam railway
- Platforms: 2
- Connections: RET Rotterdam Metro: A, B Arriva: 175, 190; RET: 30, 31, 35, 36, 37, B5

Other information
- Station code: Rta

History
- Opened: 1968

Services
| Preceding station | Nederlandse Spoorwegen | Following station |
|---|---|---|
| Rotterdam Centraal Terminus | NS Intercity 2000 Until 20:30 | Gouda towards Utrecht Centraal |
| Rotterdam Centraal Terminus | NS Intercity 2800 | Gouda towards Utrecht Centraal |
| Rotterdam Noord towards Rotterdam Centraal | NS Sprinter 4000 | Capelle Schollevaar towards Uitgeest |
| Preceding station | Rotterdam Metro | Following station |
| Oosterflank towards Vlaardingen West | Line A Not on evenings and early weekend mornings | Graskruid towards Binnenhof |
| Oosterflank towards Kralingse Zoom | Line A Evenings and early weekend mornings only | Graskruid towards Binnenhof |
| Oosterflank towards Hoek van Holland Strand | Line B | Graskruid towards Nesselande |
Location
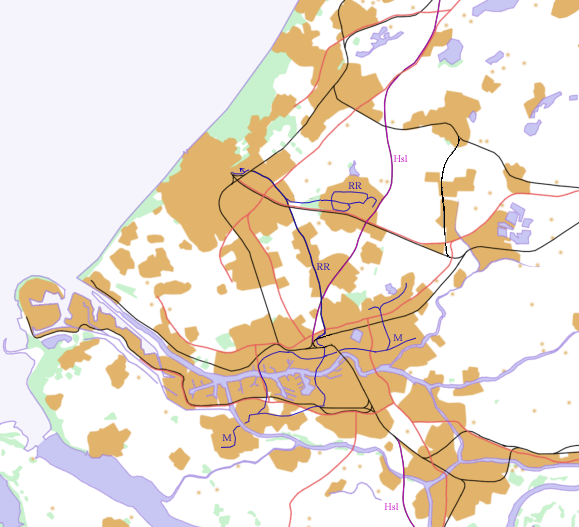
- Location within Southwest Randstad Location within Netherlands

Rotterdam Alexander is a combined metro and railway station in Rotterdam, Netherlands. It is located on the Utrecht–Rotterdam railway. It is named after the Prins Alexander borough, and therefore indirectly after Alexander, Prince of Orange. The shopping mall Alexandrium is located near the station.

== Train services ==
The following services currently call at Rotterdam Alexander:

- 1x per hour intercity service Rotterdam – Utrecht – Amersfoort – Zwolle – Groningen
- 1x per hour intercity service Rotterdam – Utrecht – Amersfoort – Zwolle – Leeuwarden
- 2x per hour intercity service Rotterdam – Utrecht
- 2x per hour local service (sprinter) Rotterdam – Gouda – Gouda-Goverwelle – Woerden – Amsterdam – Uitgeest
- 2x per hour local service (sprinter) Rotterdam – Gouda – Gouda-Goverwelle (Peak hours only)

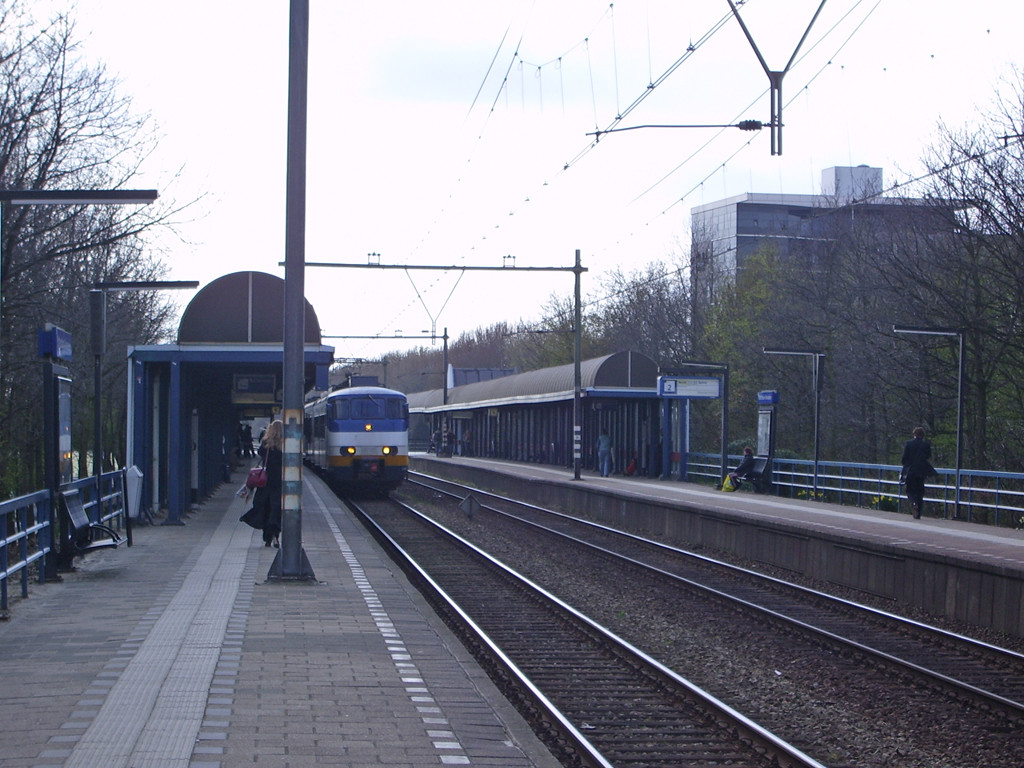
Rotterdam Alexander, railway platforms

== Metro service ==
Rotterdam Alexander station is also located on the Rotterdam Metro, a rapid transit system operated by RET. It is served by trains of lines A and B and is located on the former Caland line or east–west line (Dutch: Calandlijn / Oost-Westlijn).

== See also ==
- Nederlandse Spoorwegen
