= Prins Alexander =

Coordinates: 51°57′05″N 4°33′49″E

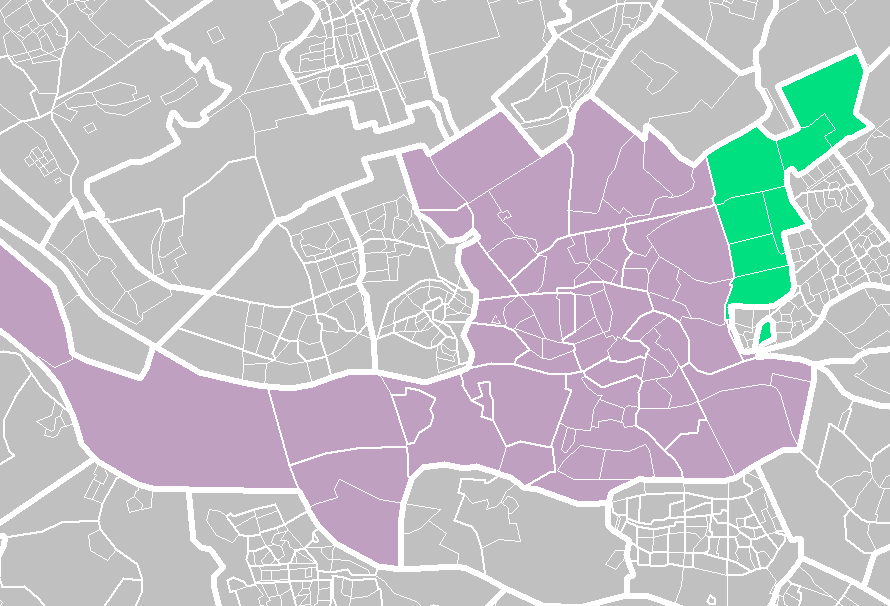
Prins Alexander (light green) within Rotterdam (purple).

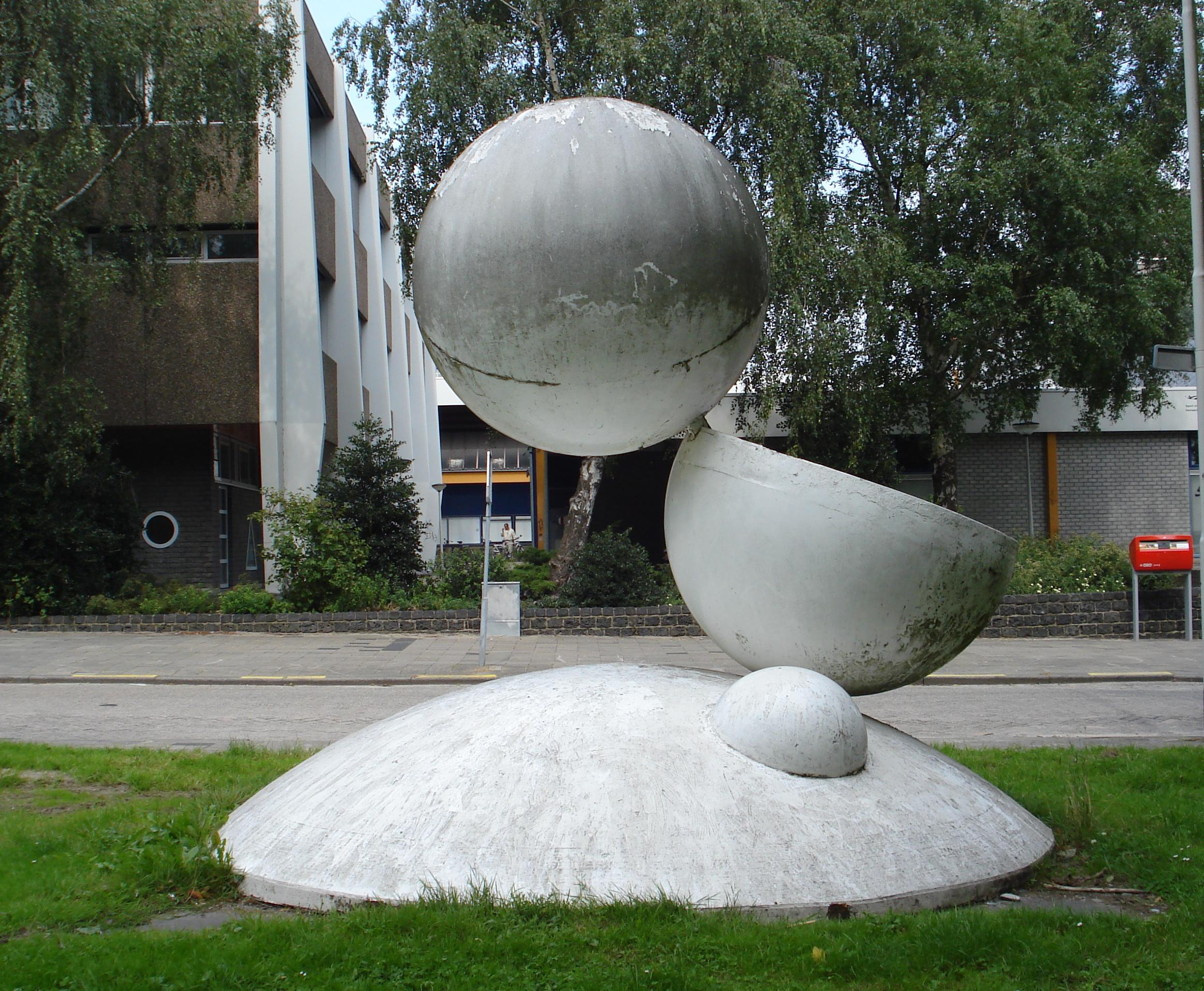
Sculpture in Ommoord

Prins Alexander is a borough in the northeast of Rotterdam, Netherlands. As of 2023, it had 96,452 inhabitants, making it the most populated borough in the city.

Prins Alexander has 7 neighbourhoods:

- Het Lage Land
- Kralingseveer
- Nesselande
- Ommoord
- Oosterflank
- Prinsenland
- Zevenkamp

== Public transportation ==
Prins Alexander is connected to the city center of Rotterdam through Rotterdam Metro lines A and B, with line A connecting to Binnenhof station and line B to Nesselande station.

Rotterdam Alexander railway station, on the main line from Rotterdam to Utrecht, is located in the center of the borough.

== Prins Alexanderpolder ==
Large parts of Prins Alexander lie in the Prins Alexanderpolder. This polder was reclaimed from peat fen near the river Rotte, north east of the city. In total 14 peat fens were laid dry. The fens were drained between 1865 and 1874, resulting in 2,825 hectares (6,980 acres) of farmland. The polder was named after Prince Alexander of the Netherlands (1851-1884).
