= Kralingse Zoom metro station =

Metro station in Rotterdam, the Netherlands

Kralingse Zoom
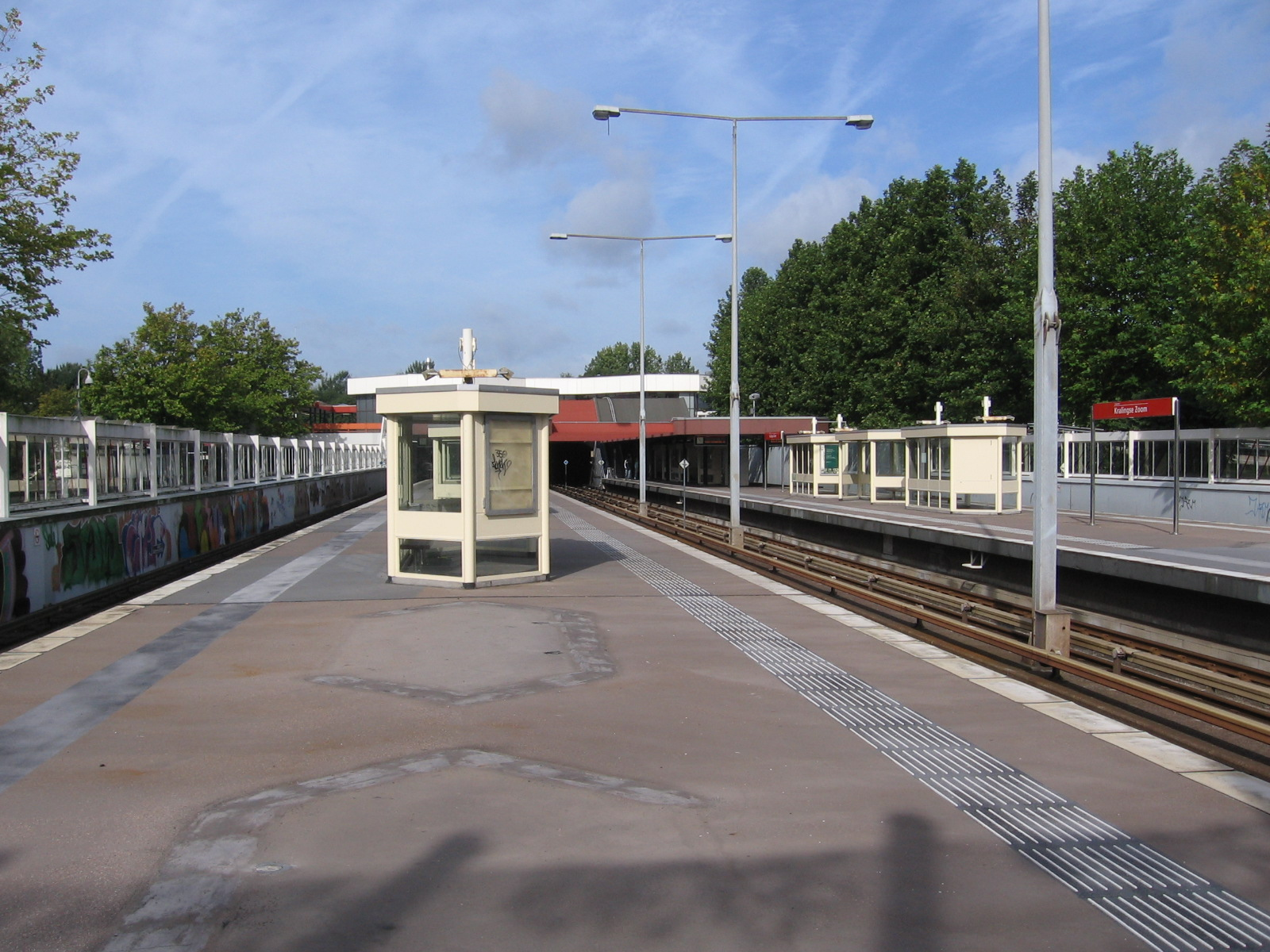

General information
- Coordinates: 51°55′17.3″N 4°32′1.55″E
- System: Rotterdam Metro station
- Owner: RET
- Platforms: 2 Island platforms
- Tracks: 4

Construction
- Structure type: At-grade

Services
Preceding station	Rotterdam Metro	Following station
Voorschoterlaan towards Vlaardingen West	Line A Not on evenings and early weekend mornings	Capelsebrug towards Binnenhof
Terminus	Line A Evenings and early weekend mornings only	Capelsebrug towards Binnenhof
Voorschoterlaan towards Hoek van Holland Strand	Line B	Capelsebrug towards Nesselande
Voorschoterlaan towards De Akkers	Line C	Capelsebrug towards De Terp
Location

Kralingse Zoom is a subway station on lines A, B, and C of the Rotterdam Metro, in the Kralingen neighbourhood of eastern Rotterdam. The station is located just west of the A16 motorway on the east side of Kralingse Zoom, the road it is named after. At Kralingse Zoom station, transfer is available to several bus lines, as well as to the ParkShuttle, a people mover to a nearby business district.

Kralingse Zoom is an above-ground station and is located just to the east of the metro tunnel in which the trains cross the city center. The station has two centre platforms, each with two tracks running alongside them. For most of the day, only the inner two tracks are used.

Kralingse Zoom is the metro stop to get to the Erasmus University and to the University of Applied Sciences (Economic Studies).
