= Binnenhof metro station =

Metro station in Rotterdam, Netherlands

Binnenhof
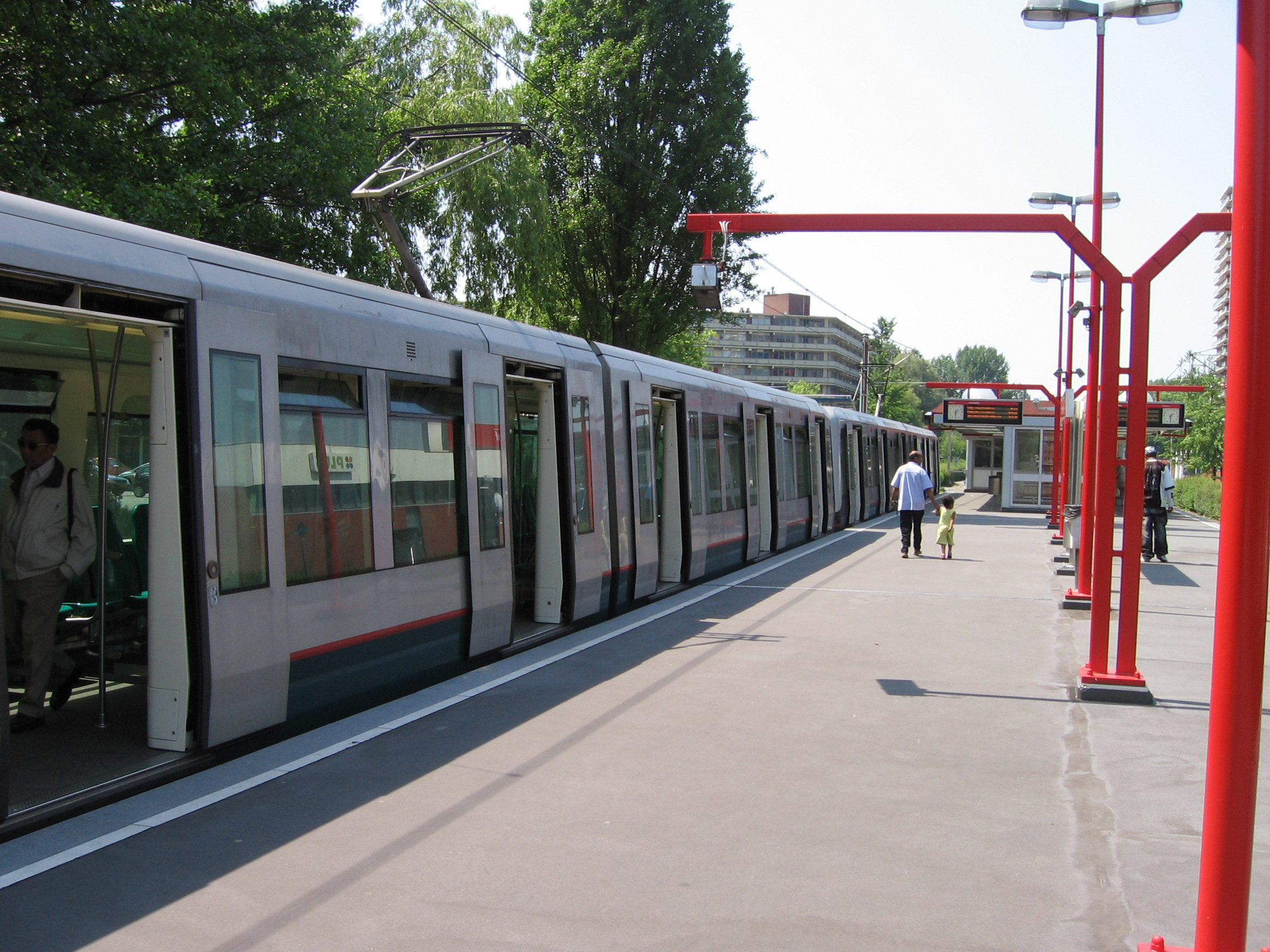

General information
- Coordinates: 51°57′37″N 4°32′09″E
- System: Rotterdam Metro station
- Owner: RET
- Platforms: Island platform
- Tracks: 2

History
- Opened: 1983

Services
Preceding station	Rotterdam Metro	Following station
Romeynshof towards Vlaardingen West	Line A Not on evenings, weekdays rush hours and early weekend mornings	Terminus
Romeynshof towards Pernis	Line A Weekdays rush hours only	Terminus
Romeynshof towards Kralingse Zoom	Line A Evenings and early weekend mornings only	Terminus
Location

Binnenhof station is the northern terminus of Line A of the Rotterdam Metro and is situated in Rotterdam-Ommoord. Trains departing from here are destined for Schiedam Centrum for most of the day. After 5pm their destination will be Kralingse Zoom and at night Alexander.

This station was opened on 28 May 1983 when the East-West Line or Calandlijn was extended from its previous terminus Capelsebrug. It consists of an island platform between two running tracks and is on a section of line that uses overhead wires to provide traction power.
