= Rotterdam Centrum =

Coordinates: 51.9179°N 4.4779°E

Centrum
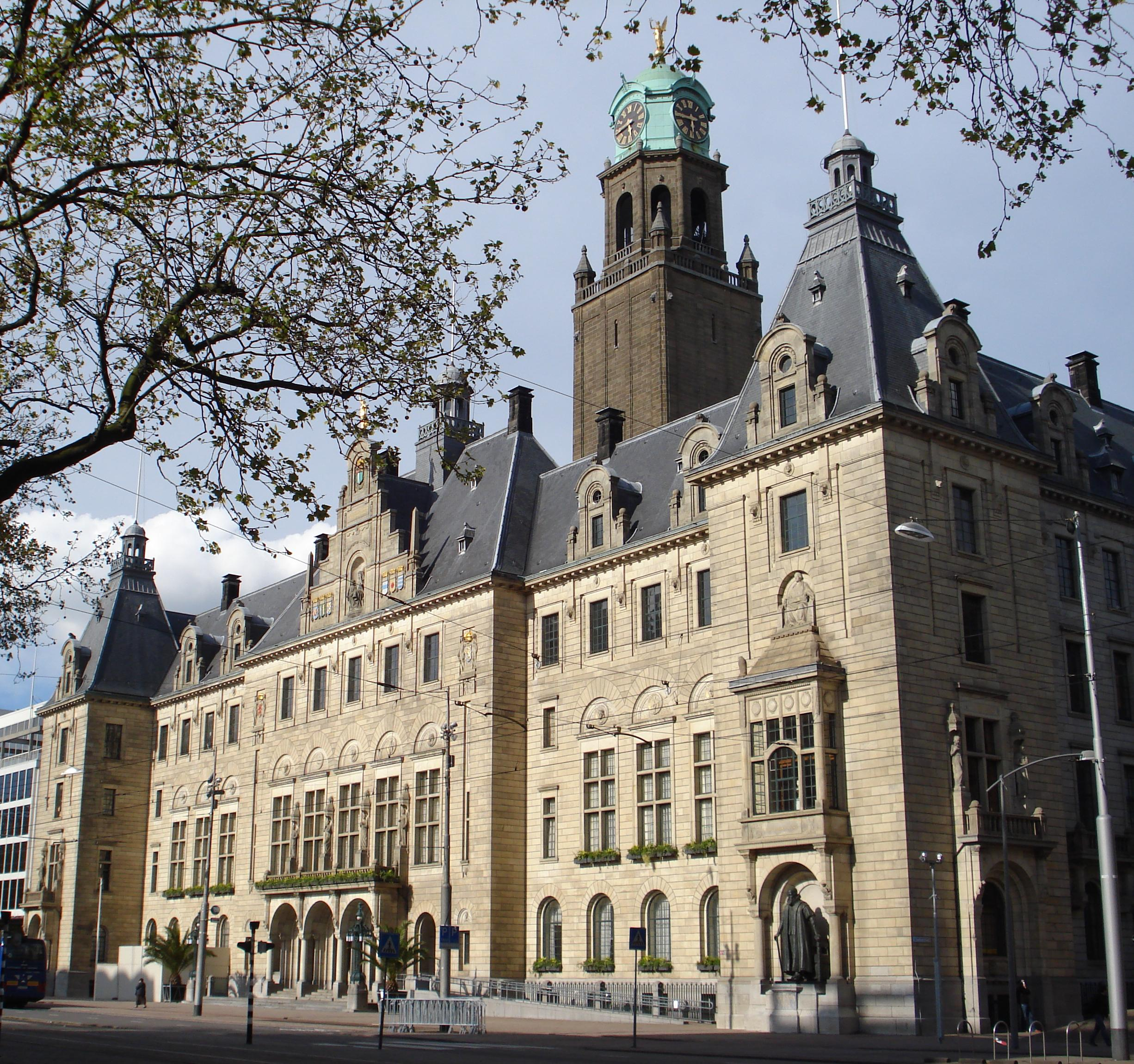
- Rotterdam City Hall

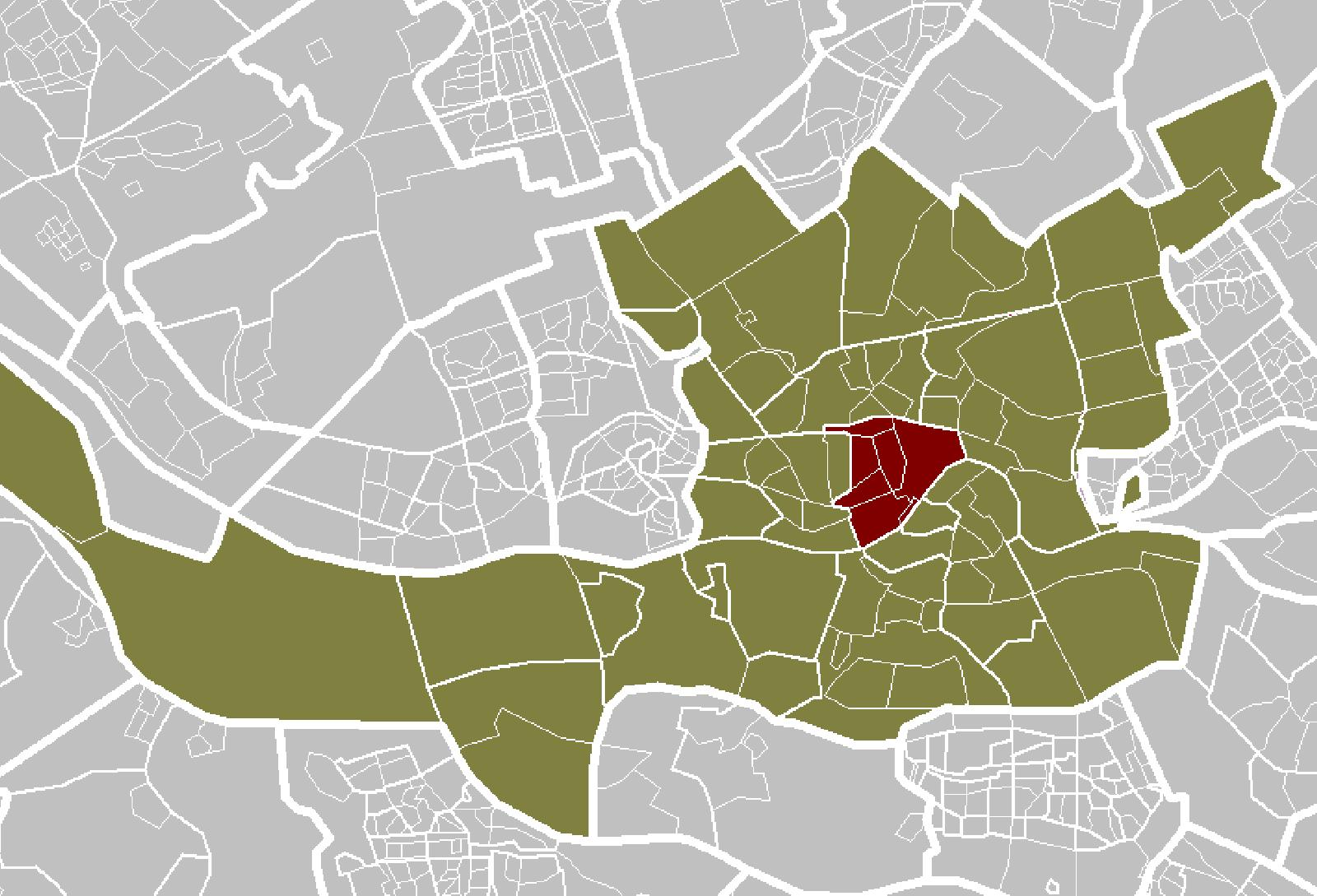
- Country: Netherlands
- Municipality: Rotterdam

Population (2017)
  - Total: 33,983

Rotterdam Centrum (English: Rotterdam Center/ Center of Rotterdam) is a borough of Rotterdam. It was established on March 3, 2010. The center has 33,983 inhabitants (as of January 1, 2017).

Rotterdam Centrum is bounded by the emplacement of the Rotterdam Centraal railway station and the Goudsesingel in the North, the Tunneltraverse of the Henegouwerlaan and 's-Gravendijkwal in the West, the Nieuwe Maas River in the South and the Oostplein in the East.

== Landmarks ==
Some landmarks include:

- Market Hall
- Euromast
- Beurstraverse (Koopgoot), with the Beurs-World Trade Center
- Lijnbaan
- Coolsingel with the city hall and Hofplein
- Erasmusbrug
- Willemsbrug
- Various stations of the Rotterdam Metro
- Grote or Sint-Laurenskerk
- Library Rotterdam
- Cube houses
- The Schielandshuis

== Neighborhoods ==
The division into neighborhoods is as follows:

- Oude Westen
- Stadsdriehoek
- Cool
- C.S. kwartier
- Nieuwe Werk (Scheepvaartkwartier)
- Dijkzigt
