= Stadsdriehoek =

Stadsdriehoek City triangle
- Neighborhood of Rotterdam
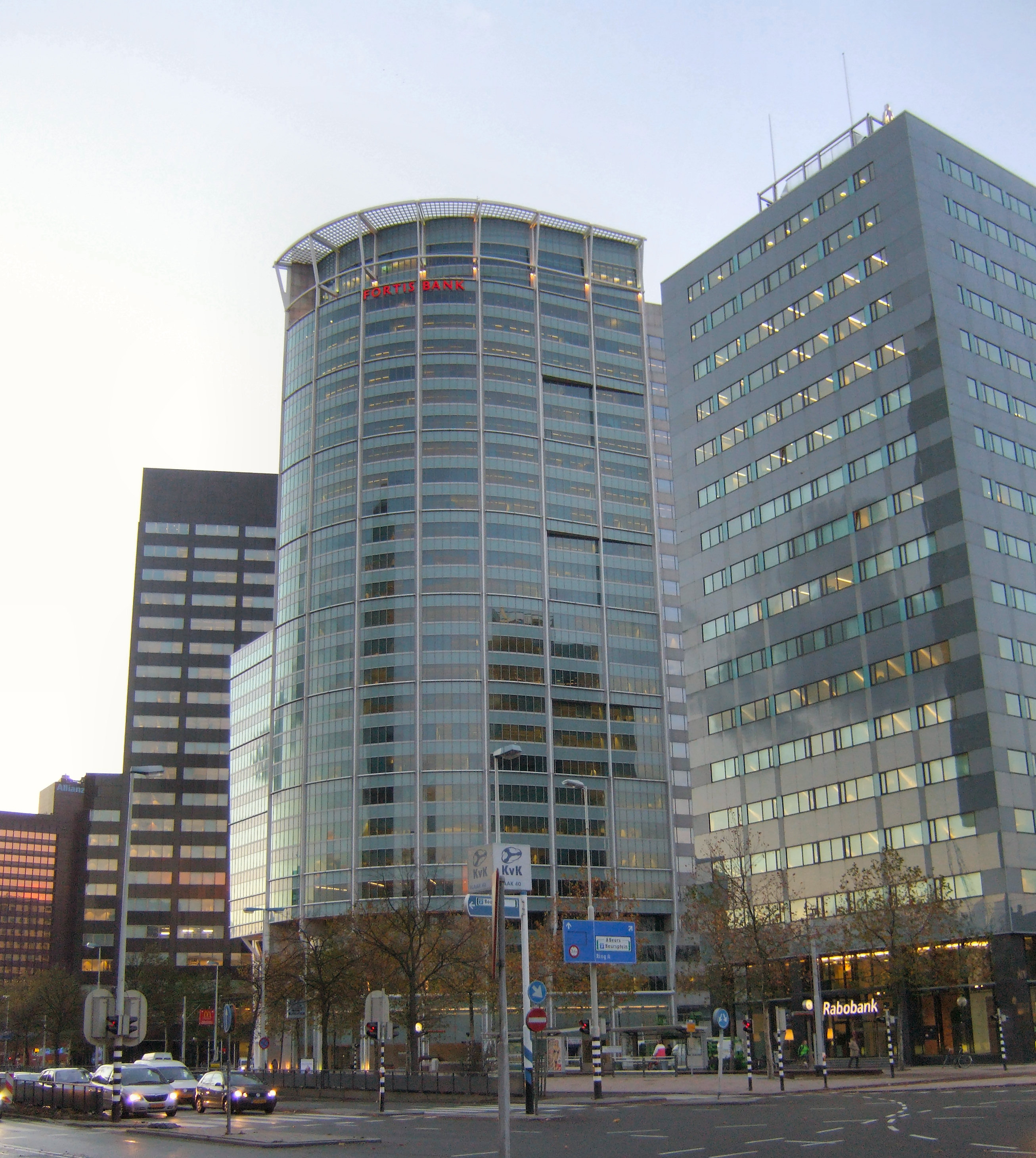
- Interactive map of Stadsdriehoek
- Coordinates: 51°55′01″N 4°29′01″E
- Country: Netherlands
- Province: South Holland
- COROP: Rotterdam
- Borough: Centrum

Area
  - Total: 2.37 sq mi (6.13 km^{2})

Population (2021)
  - Total: 17,291
- Time zone: UTC+1 (CET)
- Postal code: 3011

Stadsdriehoek is a neighborhood at the center of Rotterdam, Netherlands. The name Stadsdriehoek ("City Triangle") refers to the historical triangular form of the city of Rotterdam, which was bordered by the Coolsingel and the Schiedamsevest to the west, the Goudsevest to the northeast, and by the Nieuwe Maas to the south.

== Attractions ==
The district contains the famous Blaak which is almost half a kilometer long, To the western end there is the Churchilsplein which connects to the Coolsingel, West blaak and the Schiedamsedijk and to the eastern end right underneath the Cube house there is the Burgemeester van Walsumweg.

The street also contains the Blaak (Rotterdam Metro).

Next to the Blaak there is the Cube house Famous attraction which features a set of houses that look like a triangle.

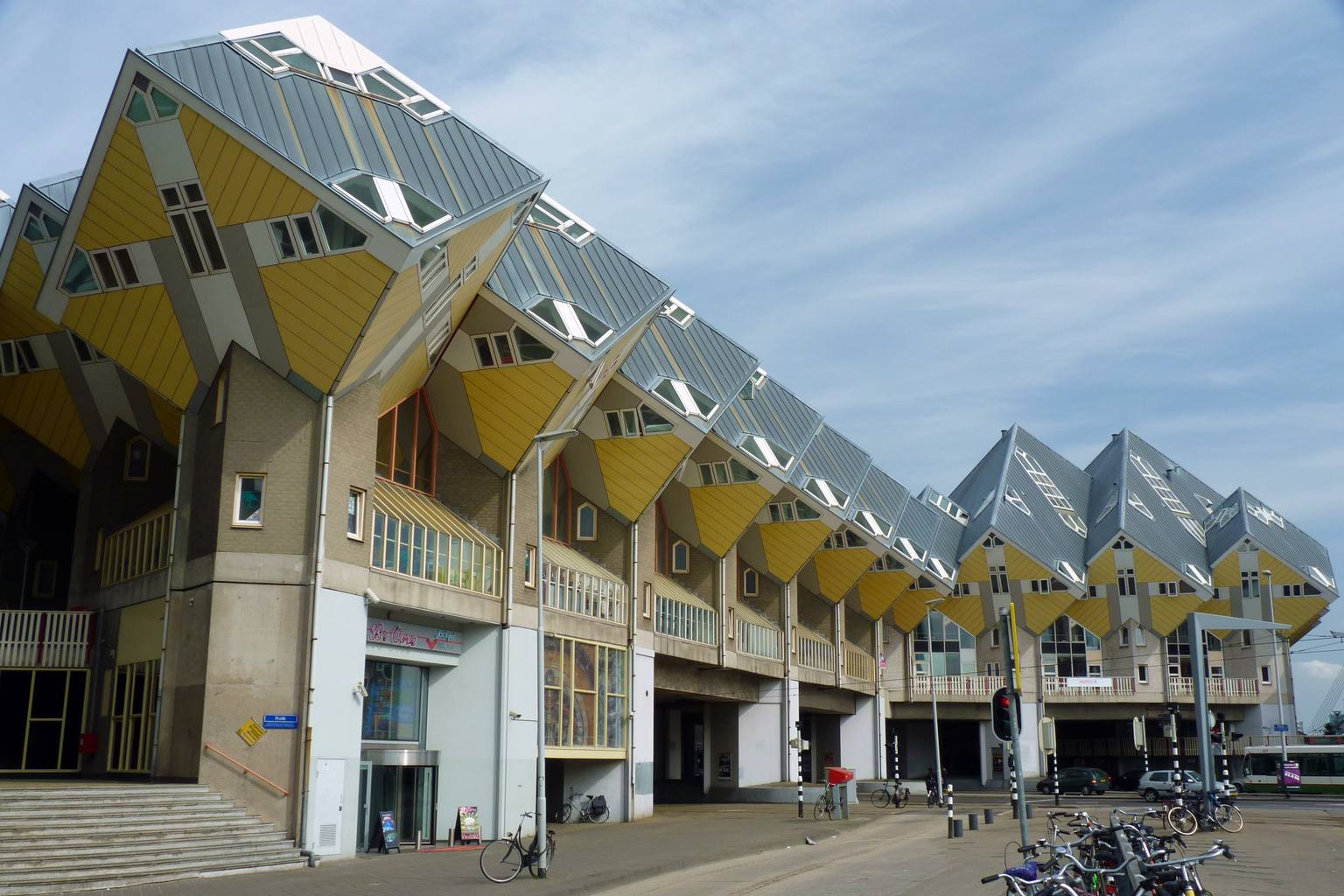
Rotterdam Cube House street view

The Market Hall is located on the Dominee Jan Scharpstraat.

In the Market Hall you can visit the indoor market that's within, The building also has residential and office spaces.

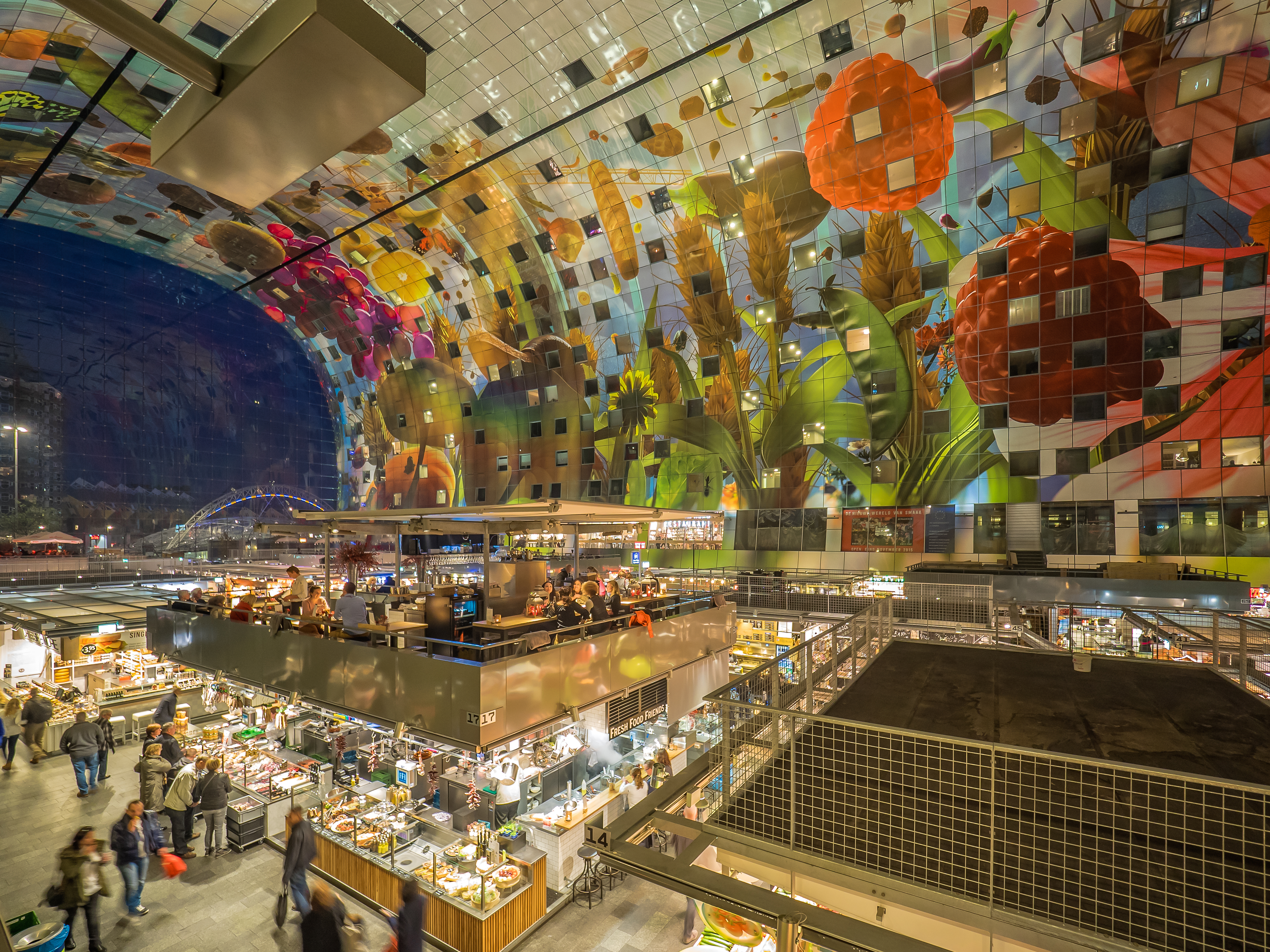
Markthal - City of Rotterdam

== History ==
Map of Rotterdam from c1690 showing the city's triangular form

The triangular form of the city of Rotterdam dates back to the Late Middle Ages. At that time, the Blaak formed the southern border of the city. In the 16th century, the "Waterstad" was established, extending the city to the Nieuwe Maas. This new area lay outside the levee and was an area for maritime and business activities. With this, the present-day form of the Stadsdriehoek was completed.

Almost none of the historical buildings in the neighborhood were spared from the Rotterdam Blitz on May 14, 1940. Only two buildings more than 200 years old survive today, the Grote or Sint-Laurenskerk (English: Great, or St. Lawrence Church) and the Schielandshuis.

In line with the Rotterdam redevelopment plans, the residential functions of the Stadsdriehoek were greatly reduced after 1946. After 1975, however, a great deal of housing was added to the neighborhoods (as well as surrounding areas). Most of the central functions of the neighborhood lie in the neighboring Cool district, which was assigned an important shopping and entertainment role in postwar rebuilding plans.

== Sources ==
- "Dashboard".
