= Erasmus MC Sophia =

- Erasmus MC
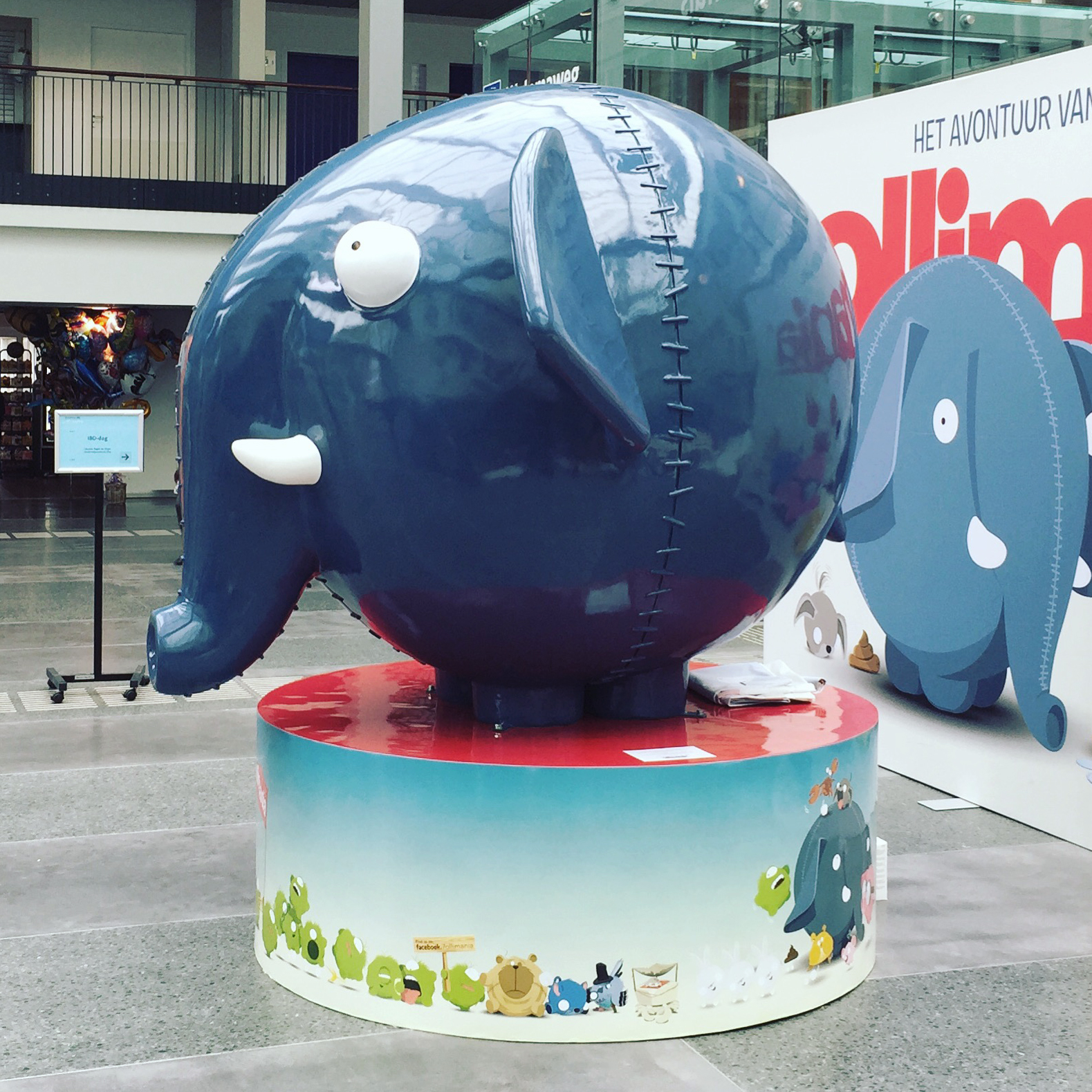
- Olli statue in the Sophia children's hospital in Rotterdam.

Geography
- Location: Wytemaweg 80, 3015 CN Rotterdam, Rotterdam, Netherlands
- Coordinates: 51°54′38″N 4°28′6″E

Organisation
- Type: Children's hospital
- Affiliated university: Erasmus University Rotterdam

Services
- Emergency department: Yes

History
- Founded: 1863

Links
- Website: www.erasmusmc.nl/en/sophia/patient-care/zoeken

The Erasmus MC Sophia, earlier called Sophia Kinderziekenhuis, is the children's hospital of the larger Rotterdam Erasmus University Hospital and a former independent hospital in Rotterdam, the Netherlands.

The Children's hospital, named after Queen Sophia, is the oldest children's hospital in the Netherlands. It was built in 1863 on the present-day Hoogstraat ("High Street"), on the site where the Beurstraverse ("Stock Exchange Traverse") currently stands. The two wards with room for eight people were located on the first floor above a furniture store. In 1866 the hospital moved to the Villa Belvedere, bought by the municipality of Rotterdam at Dirk Smitsstraat 4. After a visit in 1869 by Queen Sophia, who considered the facility down to the smallest detail, the board offered to link Her Majesty's name to the Children's Hospital, after which the name Sophia Kinderziekenhuis (Sophia Children's Hospital) was displayed on the facade from 1870 onwards.

In 1876, the construction of a new children's hospital on Westersingel was started. The hospital was located here from its opening in 1878 to 1937. After a merger in 1934 with the Zuigelingen Vereniging Rotterdam (Infant Society Rotterdam), a new children's hospital was built in 1935 at the Gordelweg in the Rotterdam district Bergpolder. The institution was located there for 60 years.

In 1993 the Sophia moved to a new building in the district Dijkzigt. Since the merger with several other Rotterdam hospitals at the beginning of the 21st century, it has been part of the Erasmus MC. As an academic hospital, in addition to direct diagnosis and treatment of patients, it also pays attention to scientific research. For example, in 1983 it started large-scale and long-term behavioral development research. That is also why Erasmus MC Sophia mainly receives children with complex or rare disorders. In addition to physical care, children can also receive psychological support and guidance in the Child and Adolescent Psychiatry and Psychology department. There are four profile areas in which highly complex care is offered from a broad multidisciplinary approach:

- Pediatric thorax center
- Children's brain center
- Mother and Child Center
- Center for Rare Disorders

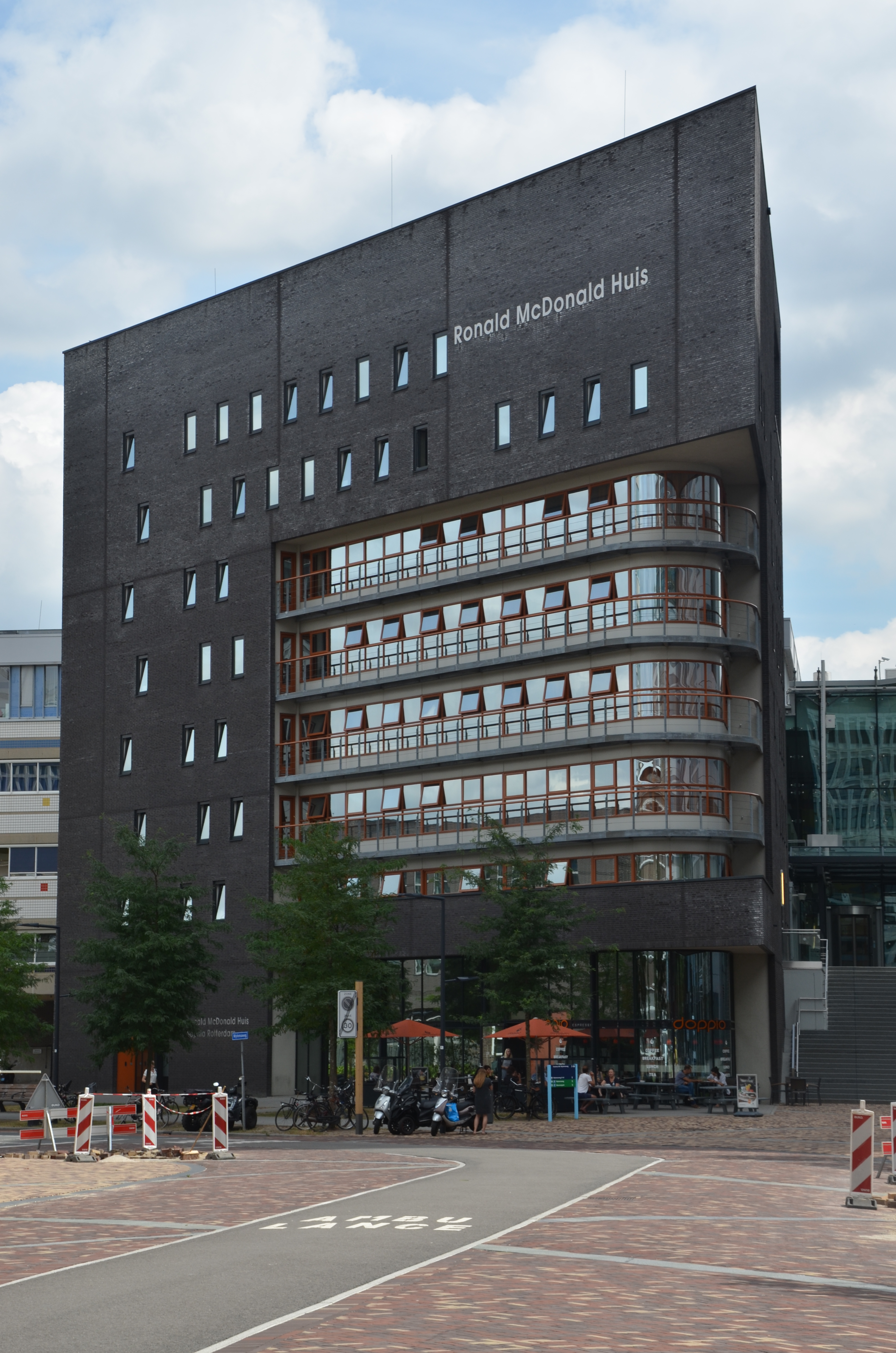
Ronald McDonald Sophia House in Rotterdam

Erasmus MC Sophia has its own TV studio, where 'Sophia TV' is made. This means twice a week live broadcasts are made for and by patients. Parents and their children can request a guest room in the Ronald McDonald House Sophia Rotterdam.

In 2013, the 150th anniversary was celebrated. On 22 May Queen Máxima unveiled 'Sophietje', the mascot of the children's hospital. On 10 September 2015, Ollimania and its creators Hein Mevissen and Diederiekje Bok donated a huge Olli statue to the Sophia Children's hospital.
