= Erasmus MC =

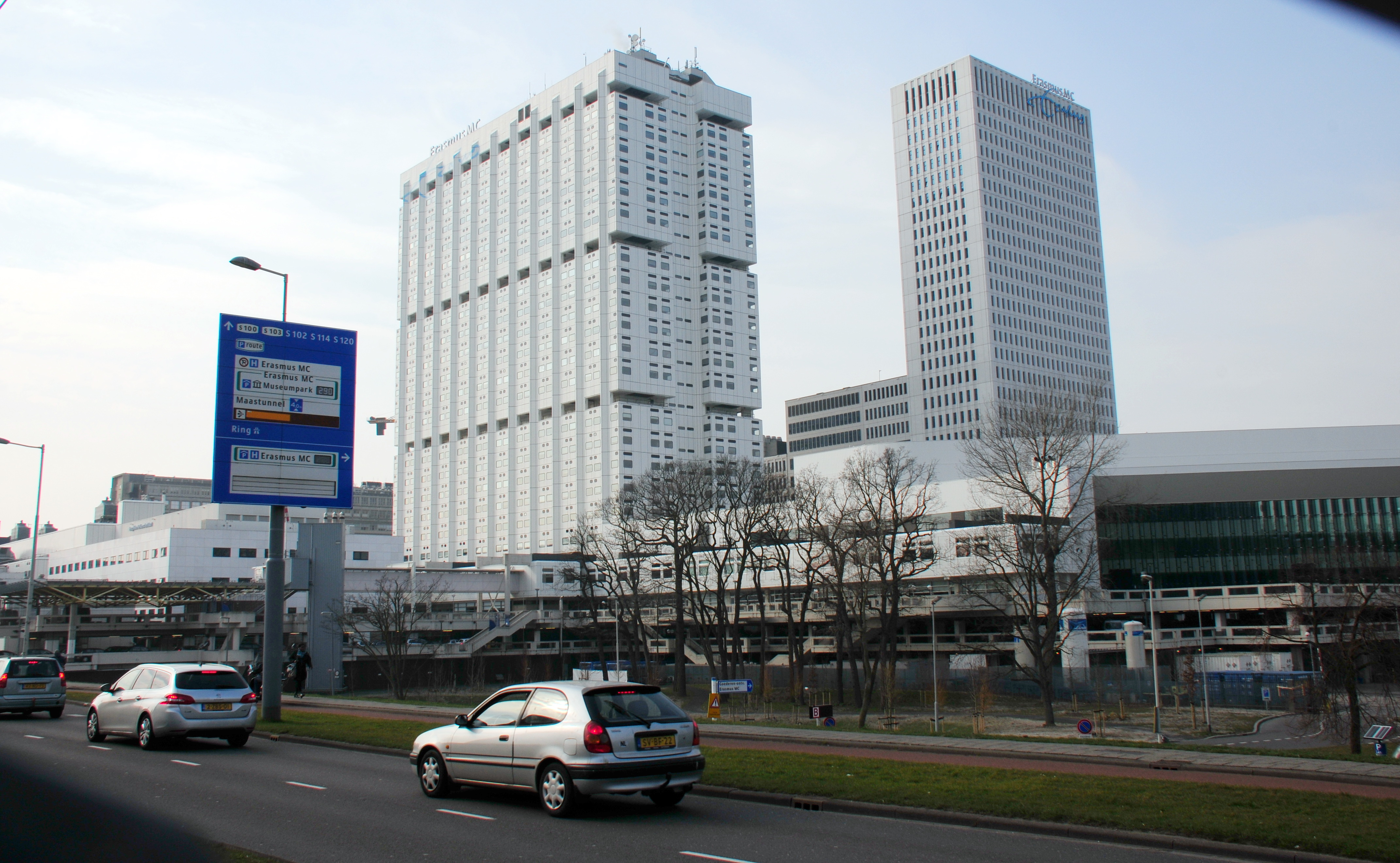
- Erasmus MC in 2015.

Geography
- Location: Dijkzigt, Rotterdam, Netherlands
- Coordinates: 51°54′38″N 4°28′6″E

Organisation
- Type: Teaching
- Affiliated university: Erasmus University Rotterdam

Services
- Emergency department: Yes Accident & Emergency; Major Trauma Centre
- Beds: 1233 (121 IC)
- Speciality: Cardiovascular diseases, Clinical Genetics, Endocrinology, Gastroenterology, Human reproductive system, Immunology, Microsurgery, Oncology, Pediatrics & Pediatric surgery, and Virology

Helipads
- Helipad: Yes

History
- Opened: 1840 as Coolsingelziekenhuis; 1961 as Dijkzigtziekenhuis; 1970 as Academic Hospital Rotterdam; 2002 as Erasmus MC

Links
- Website: https://www.erasmusmc.nl/en/

Erasmus University Medical Center (Erasmus MC or EMC) is a teaching hospital based in Rotterdam, Netherlands, affiliated with Erasmus University and home to its faculty of medicine. It is the largest and one of the most authoritative scientific university medical centers in Europe. The hospital is the largest of the eight university medical centers in the Netherlands, both in terms of turnover and number of beds. The Erasmus MC ranks #1 among the top European institution in clinical medicine and #20 in the world, according to the Times Higher Education rankings. The hospital is named after Desiderius Erasmus.

== Structure ==
The hospital has three locations:

- Erasmus MC – the main location.
- Erasmus MC Sophia Children's Hospital, the pediatric hospital, closely connected to the main location by a raised glass hallway.
- Erasmus MC Cancer Institute, specialized in oncology.

Special units include:

- Neurosurgery
- Cardiothoracic surgery
- Neonatal and pediatric surgery and intensive care
- Pediatric oncology
- Level I trauma center (including trauma helicopter)
- Department of Viroscience

The main location of Erasmus MC is located next to the Museumpark.

== History ==
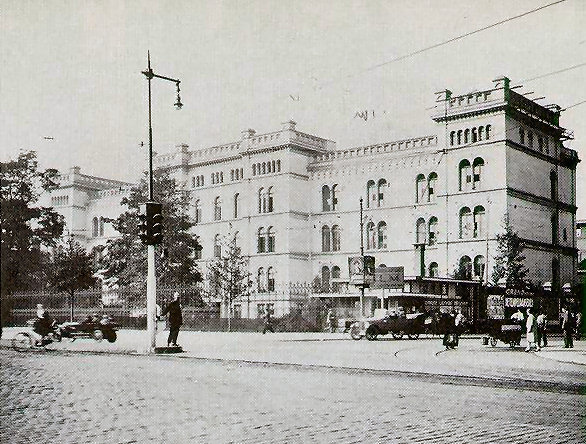
The Coolsingel Hospital in 1929.

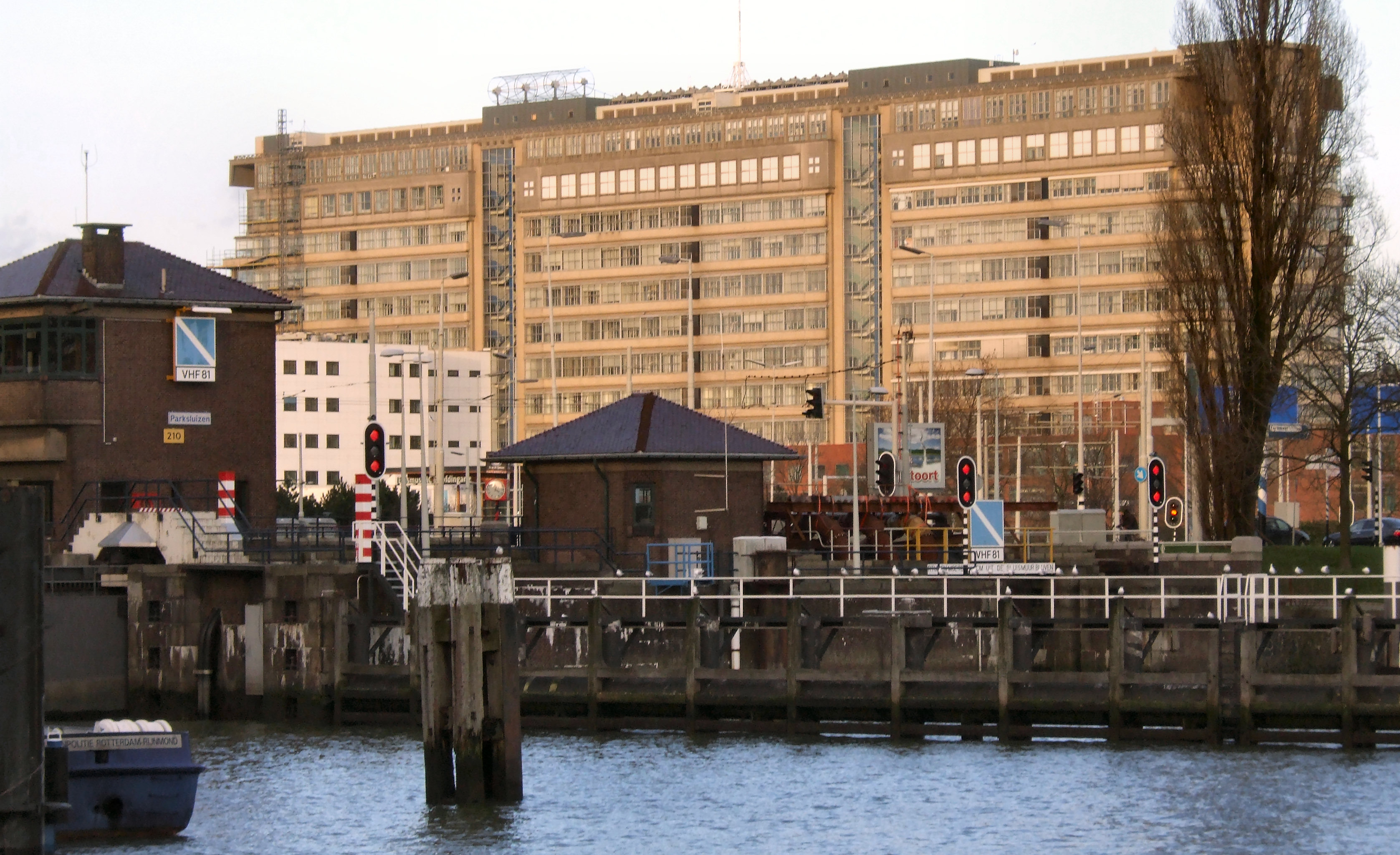
The Dijkzigt Hospital, part of the Erasmus MC, demolished 2018.

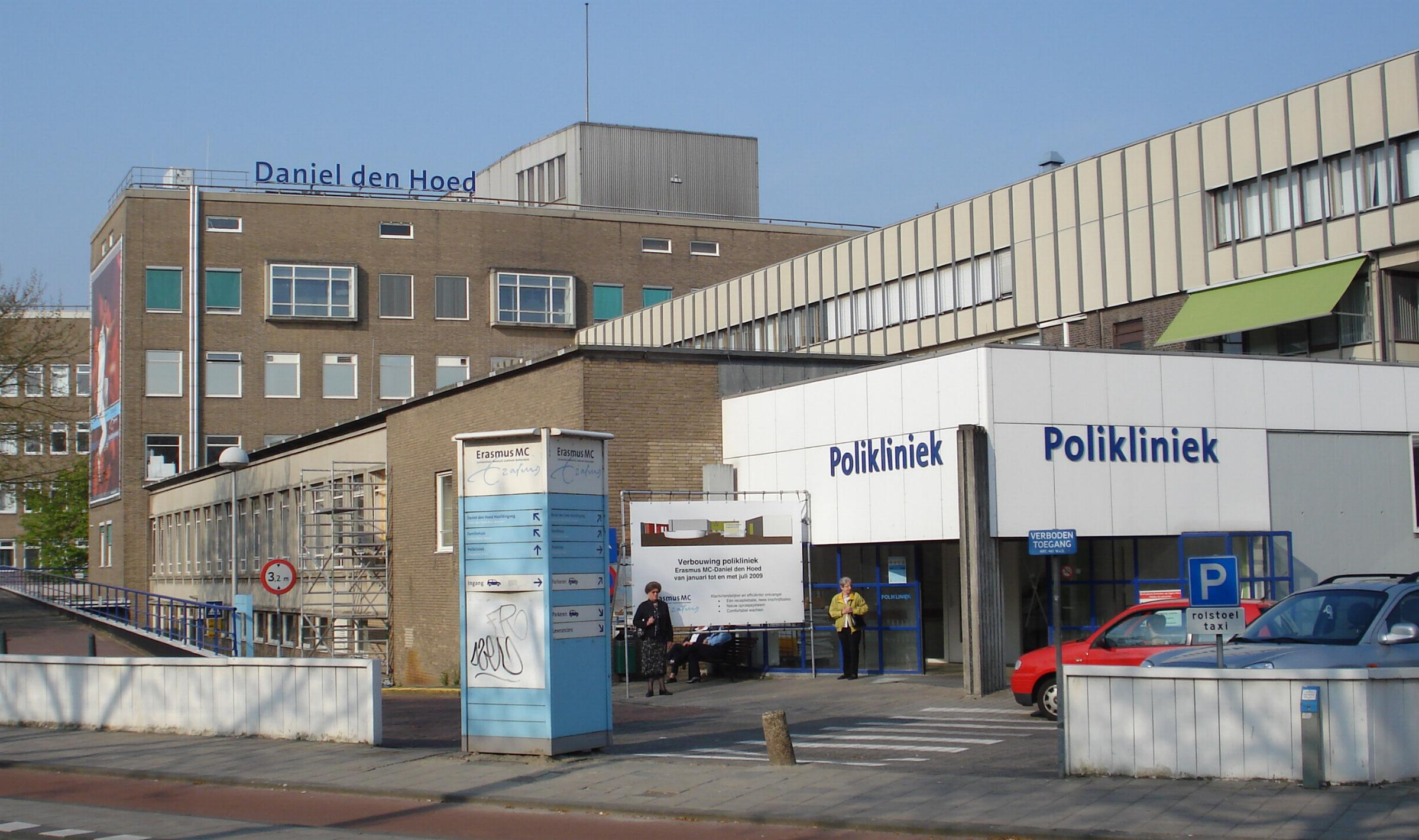
The Daniel den Hoed Cancer Center, the oncology center of the Erasmus MC in the neighbourhood Feijenoord.Moved and renamed in 'Erasmus MC Cancer Center'

The history of Erasmus MC goes back to the municipal Coolsingel Hospital (Coolsingelziekenhuis), which was built in the period 1839–1848 by design of city architect Willem Nicolaas Rose (1801–1877). Due to delays during construction, the hospital could not be used until 1851. The building was at the corner of the Van Oldebarneveltstraat and the Coolsingel (near current Lijnbaan) in Rotterdam and had an imposing facade with a width of eighty-two meters. The first hospital director was Dr. Jan Bastiaan Molewater (1813–1864), who was also a lecturer at the Clinical School that was opened in Rotterdam in 1828. The hospital was largely destroyed during the German bombing of Rotterdam by the Luftwaffe in 1940. Only the Coolsingelpoort, the former gate to the hospital, now reminds of this hospital at the Lijnbaan.

After a long period of temporary provisions, the new Dijkzigt Hospital (Dijkzigtziekenhuis) could finally be used in 1961, at the location where the Erasmus MC is now located. The Dijkzigt Hospital was named after Villa Dijkzigt on the enormous estate called Land van Hoboken, which was the home of the Dutch shipowner's family Van Hoboken. In 1924, this land was sold to the Rotterdam municipality and on which since today the Natural History Museum Rotterdam is housed.

The Foundation for Clinical Higher Education in Rotterdam (Stichting Klinisch Hoger Onderwijs in Rotterdam), founded in 1950, was designated by the Dutch government in 1965, to become one of the seven major medical training centers in the Netherlands. In 1966, this new medical training center was opened at the G.J. de Jonghweg with 160 medical students. The Dijkzigt Hospital became its corresponding academic hospital.

In 1970, the Dijkzigt Hospital merged with the Sophia Children's Hospital (Sophia Kinderziekenhuis) into the Academic Hospital Rotterdam (Academisch Ziekenhuis Rotterdam). In 1973, the medical training center of Rotterdam became part of the Erasmus University Rotterdam (Erasmus Universiteit Rotterdam), designated as Faculty of Medicine and Health Science (Faculteit der Geneeskunde en Gezondheidswetenschappen), and moved to the complex of the Dijkzigt Hospital. In 1993, the Sophia Children's Hospital also moved to this location. In the same year, also the Daniel den Hoed Clinic (Daniel den Hoedkliniek) – a main Dutch oncology center named after Daniël den Hoed, the founder of radiotherapy in the Netherlands – became part of the Academic Hospital Rotterdam. On 1 June 2002, the Dijkzigt Hospital, the Sophia Children's Hospital, the Daniel den Hoed Clinic, and the Faculty of Medicine and Health Sciences, all formally merged into the current Erasmus University Medical Center (Erasmus MC), which is affiliated with Erasmus University Rotterdam.

Erasmus MC started in May 2009, with a major new construction and renovation project at their location. The first part (at the east) was completed in 2013, and put into use. The second part (at the West) was completed in late 2017, and put into operation in 2018. A new main entrance was constructed close to the Dijkzigt metro station, on the Wytemaweg. Hereafter is planned the demolition of the old Dijkzigt Hospital and the renovation of the Faculty of Medicine tower and the buildings of the Sophia Children's Hospital.

On 28 September 2023, two shootings occurred in Rotterdam with one of them occurring in a classroom at Erasmus MC. One lecturer was killed at the university along with a woman and daughter who were killed in a residential building elsewhere in Rotterdam.

== Complete Genomics ==
In May 2011, Erasmus Medical Center signed an agreement with California-based Complete Genomics (Nasdaq: GNOM), a life sciences company that has developed and commercialized a proprietary DNA sequencing platform for human genome sequencing and analysis. Complete Genomics signed a contract to produce genetic sequence for 250 Erasmus Medical Center samples. In September 2012, the Beijing Genomics Institute purchased Complete Genomics for $117M. The United States Committee on Foreign Investment in the United States cleared the purchase by December 2012.

The head of bioinformatics, Dr. Peter J. van der Spek, claimed that Complete Genomics' complete human genome sequencing service will allow us to study genetic variations at a higher resolution and greater sensitivity than has been previously possible."

== Organization ==
Erasmus MC's field of activity is broad and extends from illness to health and from individual to social healthcare. The Sophia Children's Hospital and the Cancer Institute fall under Erasmus MC. Erasmus MC also owns the Admiraal de Ruyter Hospital (ADRZ) in Zeeland.

The hospital has 39 operating theaters and 1,233 beds. There are 121 Intensive Care beds and 16 Radiotherapy bunkers. As a university medical center, Erasmus MC in the Netherlands contributes to research, education and patient care. 13,858 employees and 949 specialists work there. In addition, 2,322 employees at the Admiraal de Ruyter Hospital (ADRZ) in Zeeland. 4,093 medical students are trained at Erasmus MC. It has a health sciences and basic research sector as well as a large number of academic hospital functions. The hospital is one of eleven trauma centers in the Netherlands and has a Mobile Medical Team.

Erasmus MC is represented in the Dutch Federation of University Medical Centers (NFU).

== COVID-19 pandemic ==
During the COVID-19 crisis in the Netherlands, Erasmus MC was designated as the location for the 'National Coordination Center for Patients Spreading' around the bed capacity of intensive care during the corona crisis in the Netherlands. Together with the National Institute for Public Health and the Environment in Bilthoven, it was also one of two expertise laboratories that carried out corona tests together with regional upscaling laboratories. Finally, Erasmus MC, together with Utrecht University, is conducting research into antibodies against SARS-CoV-2.

== See also ==
- 2023 Rotterdam shootings
