= Atlantic Huis =

Dutch Building

Coordinates: 51°54′33″N 4°28′44″E

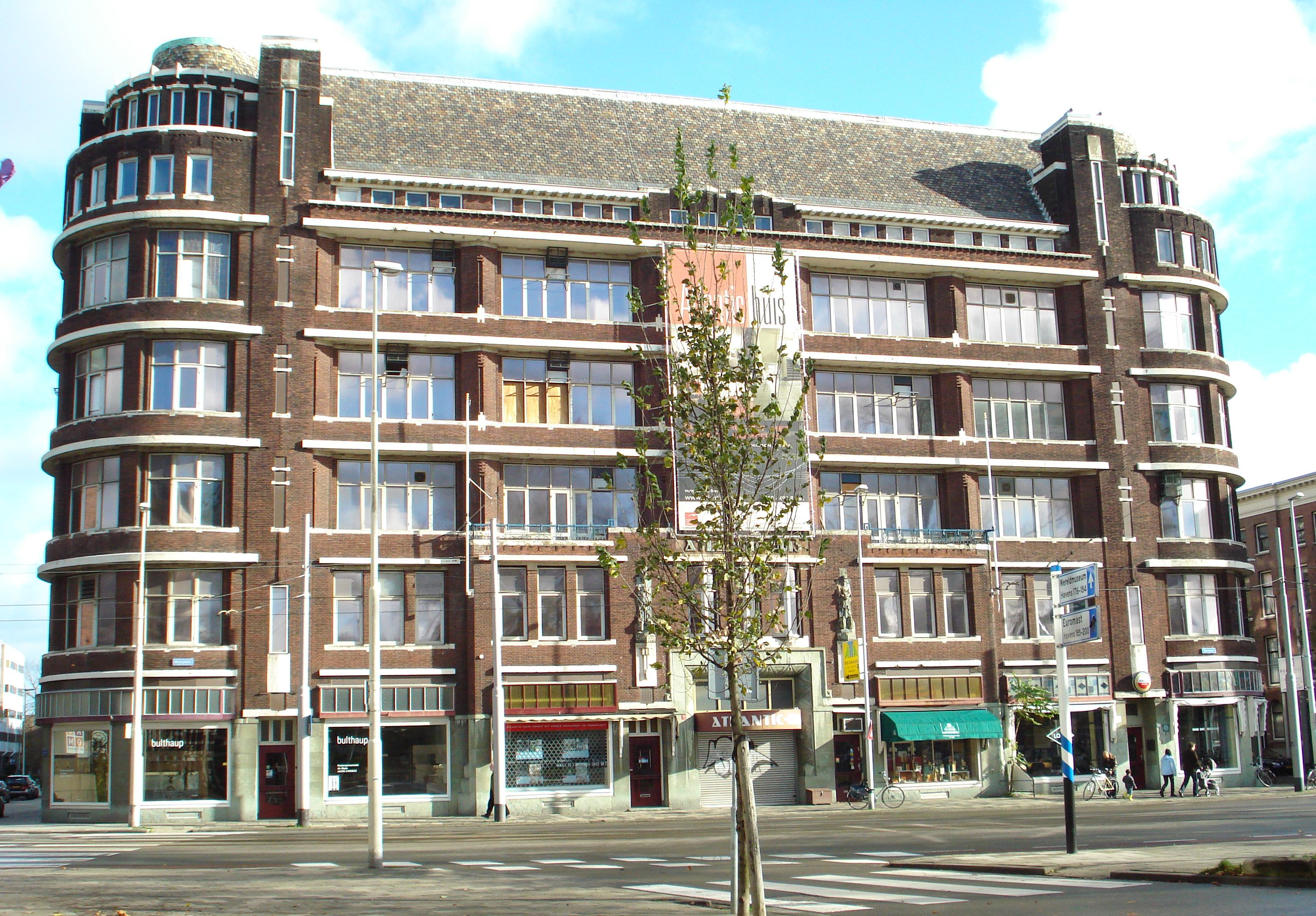

Atlantic Huis ("Atlantic House") is a business complex in the Scheepvaartkwartier in Rotterdam. The house is opposite the Veerhaven.

== History ==
The Atlantic was built between 1928 and 1930 in Art Deco style, designed by architect Piet Buskens. The building is special because it is one of the first industrial buildings in the Netherlands and because it is one of the first buildings equipped with a parking garage . The building has a concrete frame and is clad with brick and concrete . At the entrance of the Atlantic are two images in the facade by Willem Coenraad Brouwer. They depict Hermes, the god of commerce, and Neptune, the god of the sea.

== Current position ==
The Atlantic is still in use as a business center. On the ground floor is the famous Café Loos. On the upper floors are luxury residential apartments.

The Atlantic is a rijksmonument.
