= C.S. kwartier =

Coordinates: 51°55′28″N 4°27′58″E

- Neighborhood of Rotterdam
- Interactive map of C.S. kwartier
- Country: Netherlands
- Province: South Holland
- COROP: Rotterdam
- Borough: Centrum
- Time zone: UTC+1 (CET)

C.S. kwartier is the central neighborhood of Rotterdam, Netherlands, immediately surrounding Rotterdam Centraal Station. The neighborhood has access to a major harbor in Rotterdam, and is also called the Central District of Rotterdam.
