= Oude Westen =

Coordinates: 51°55′05″N 4°28′03″E

- Neighborhood of Rotterdam
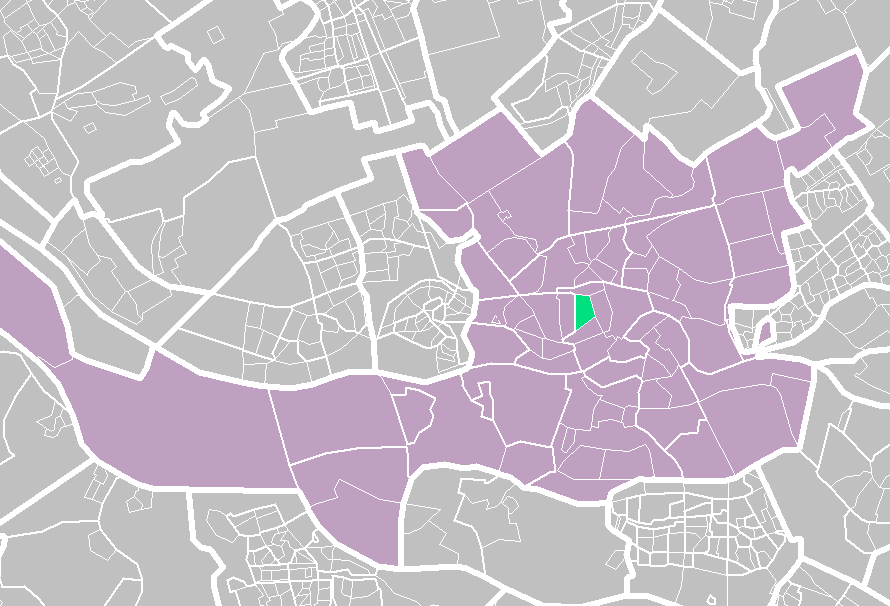
- Country: Netherlands
- Province: South Holland
- COROP: Rotterdam
- Borough: Centrum
- Time zone: UTC+1 (CET)

Chinatown (Rotterdam)
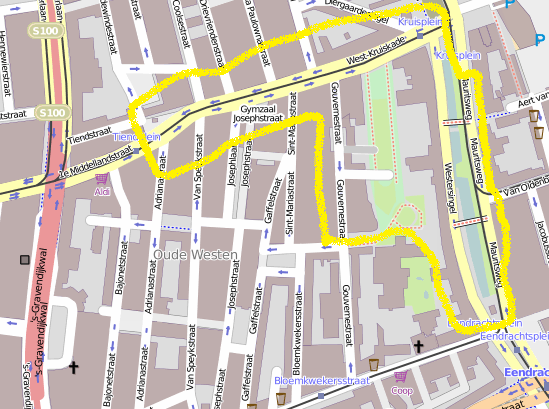
- Traditional Chinese: 鹿特丹唐人街
- Simplified Chinese: 鹿特丹唐人街
Transcriptions
Standard Mandarin
- Hanyu Pinyin: Lùtèdān tángrénjiē
Yue: Cantonese
- Yale Romanization: luk^{6} dak^{6} daan^{1} tong^{4} yan^{4} gaai^{1}

Oude Westen (Old West) is a neighborhood of Rotterdam, Netherlands adjacent to the city center.

The neighborhood was created in the late 19th century when the territory of the district belonged to the then municipality Delfshaven. Delfshaven put few demands on ground operators, which became a neighborhood filled with speculators construction. In 1886, because of the annexation of Delfshaven, Oude Westen became a part of Rotterdam. The municipality of Rotterdam applied a systemic approach regarding urban expansion of Delfshaven, which, among other things, caused paved roads and sewers in the neighborhood. As the city grew, the western part of the city reached to Schiedam. Since then the oldest part of district is called Oude Westen.

Oude Westen is a neighborhood with two main roads: The West-Kruiskade, known for its Chinatown and the many shops where products or foodstuffs are sold from abroad, and Nieuwe Binnenweg, known for its cafes, coffee shops, nightclubs and foreign restaurants.

Trams run by these two streets. Oude Westen is bordered on the western side by the Henegouwerlaan and 's-Gravendijkwal, on the eastern side by the Westersingel and by the northern and southern side the Weena and Rochussenstraat.

In the neighborhood live people from many different nationalities: 70% of the shops are run by people of foreign origin.

The neighborhood is known as pleasant to visit, but is considered, especially in the evening hours, as a "problem neighborhood". After the crime in the 1990s in this area greatly increased, the municipality of Rotterdam has taken several measures to improve the safety including drafting cameras.

The following areas of the neighborhood constitute the Chinatown in Rotterdam:

- Kruisplein
- Schouwburgplein
- West-Kruiskade
- Diergaardesingel
- Mauritsweg
- Westersingel

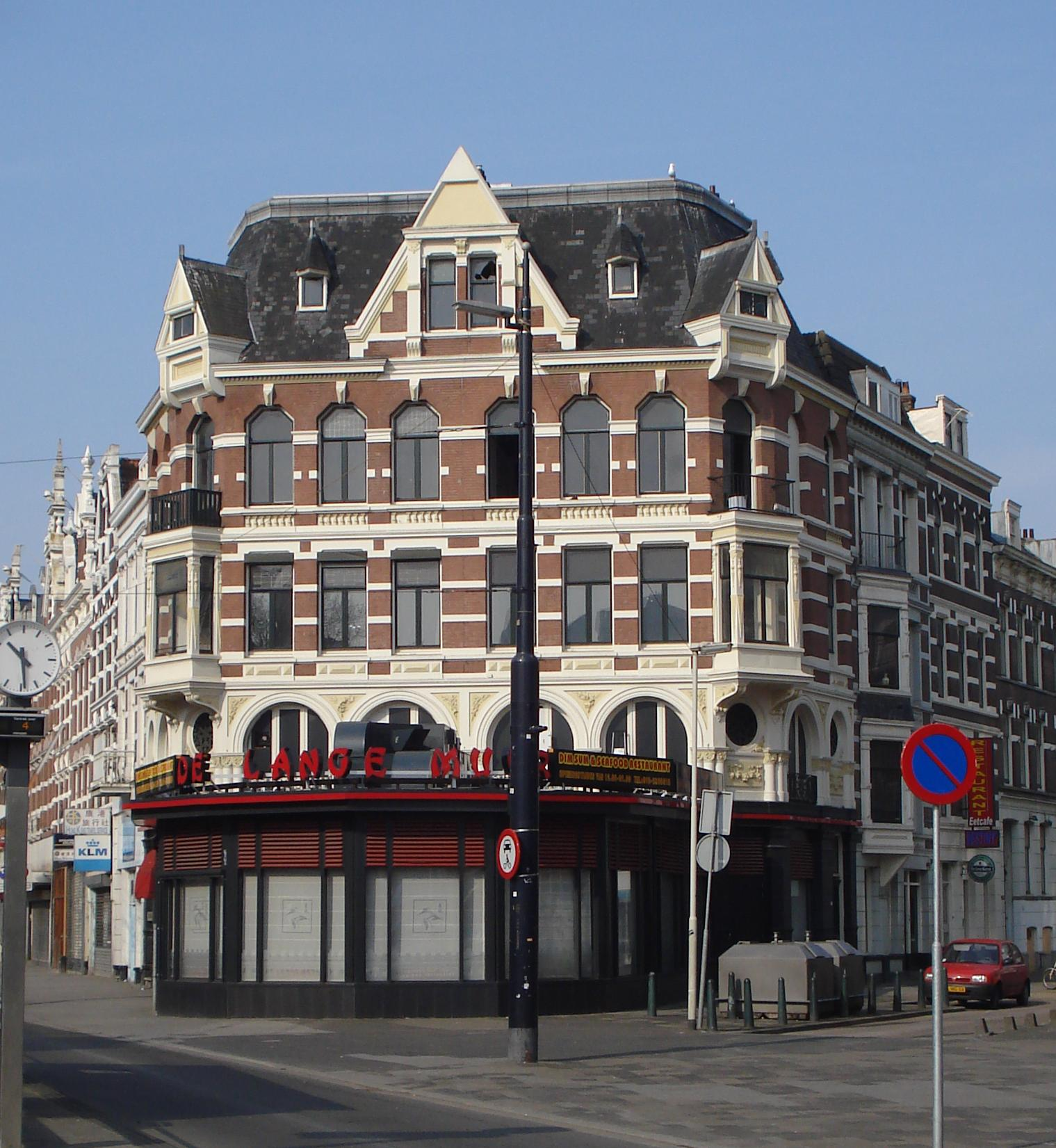
West-Kruiskade / Diergaardesingel
