= Schielandshuis =

Historic mansion in Rotterdam, the Netherlands

The main entrance

The Schielandshuis (Dutch: Het Schielandshuis) is a historic mansion in Stadsdriehoek in the center of Rotterdam, the Netherlands. This is one of the two buildings (along with Sint-Laurenskerk) older than the 19th century which survived the 1940 German bombing of Rotterdam.

The Schielandshuis was built in 1662—1665 by Jacob Lois and Pieter Post. This is the only building of the Dutch Golden Age still standing in Rotterdam. It was owned by the water board (Hoogheemraadschap van Schieland). During his visit in Rotterdam in October 1811, Napoleon spent a night in the Schielandshuis. A few years later, Alexander I of Russia stayed there as well, and he refused to enter the room Napoleon used. In 1841, the city of Rotterdam bought the building.

In 1849, the Boymans Museum, currently Museum Boijmans Van Beuningen, the oldest museum in Rotterdam, moved in to the Schielandshuis. During the night 15 to 16 February 1864, there was a huge fire which destroyed the building; two-thirds of the collection was lost. The origin of the fire was never discovered. The building was restored, however, the restoration did not respect the original plans. In 1905, a museum of antiquities was also opened in the building. In 1867, the museum was reopened. In 1935, the Boymans Museum moved out of the Schielandshuis to its current location at the Museumpark.

Schielandshuis survived the 1940 bombing, in which much of the center of Rotterdam was destroyed. However, it was badly maintained after the war, closed in 1960 on the orders of the fire inspection, and only after 1978 restored with the intention to recreate the 17th century state. The building was opened in 1986, and the museum was renamed Museum Rotterdam in 2011. In 2016, this museum moved out as well, and the tourist information center moved in. Since 2024 the building is empty.
