= 2023 Rotterdam shootings =

Attack in the Netherlands

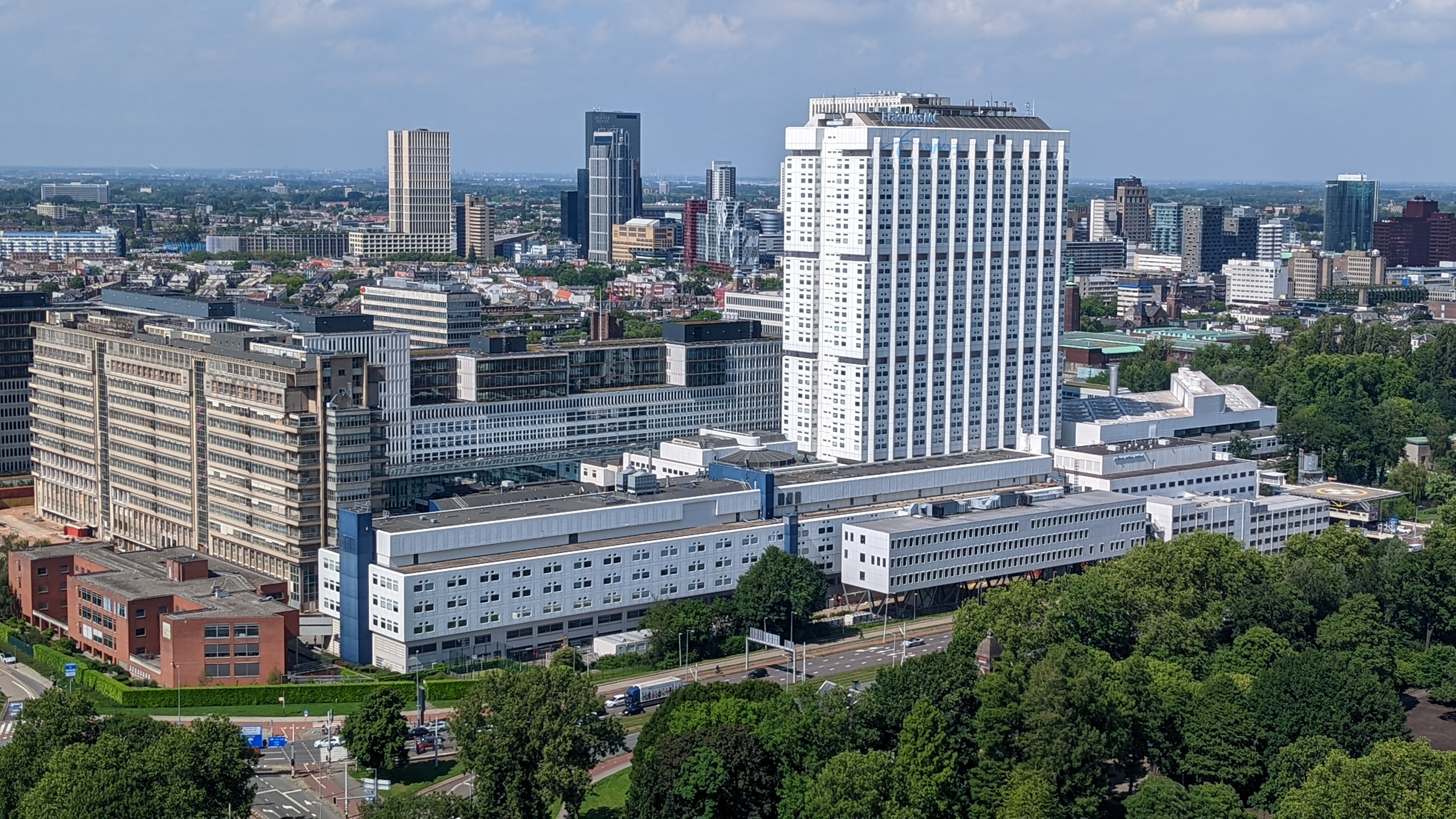
- Erasmus University Medical Center, one of the locations of the shootings
- Locations of the shootings
- Location: Rotterdam, Netherlands
- Date: 28 September 2023 c. 14:10 – c. 15:30 (CEST)
- Attack type: Spree shooting; School shooting; Arson; Mass murder
- Weapon: 9mm Glock 19 semi-automatic pistol with a laser sight
- Deaths: 3
- Injuries: 0
- Perpetrator: Fouad Lakhlili

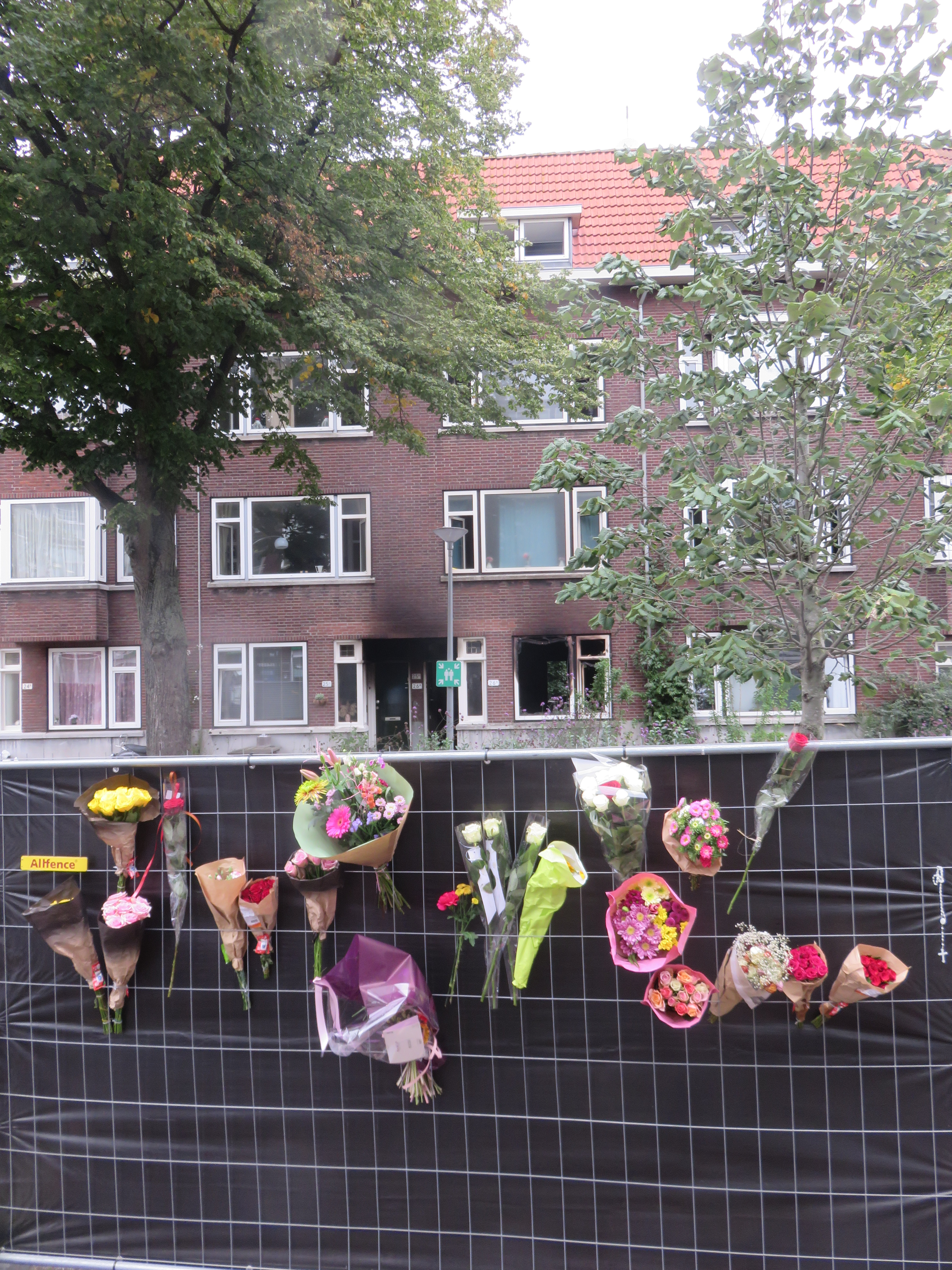
Heiman Dullaertplein the day after the attack, with damage from the fire visible on the house.

On 28 September 2023, two shootings occurred in Rotterdam, Netherlands. The first, in which two people were killed, was at a residence on Heiman Dullaertplein, followed by a second, in which one person was killed, in a classroom at the Erasmus University Medical Center. The perpetrator, identified as medical student Fouad Lakhlili was sentenced to life imprisonment in 2025.

== Shootings ==
The shootings began on 28 September 2023 at around 14:10 CEST, when the Rotterdam-Rijnmond safety region received reports of a fire and explosions at a residence on the Heiman Dullaertplein in Delfshaven, Rotterdam. The explosive sounds reported were later believed to have originated from gunfire within the residence.

By 14:25, the police had also received reports of a shooting at the nearby Erasmus University Medical Center. The shooting took place in a building located on the Rochussenstraat, which is used as an education center for medical students. During the attack, the gunman also set part of the hospital on fire.

The suspected perpetrator left the Erasmus Medical Center at around 15:30, wearing a bulletproof vest and carrying a gun. He was taken into custody by police underneath the hospital's helipad.

== Victims ==
A 39-year-old mother was killed in her house on Heiman Dullaertplein, and her 14-year-old daughter suffered serious injuries from which she later died. A 43-year-old general practitioner and teacher of the Erasmus University Faculty of Medicine was fatally shot at the Erasmus University Medical Center.

== Perpetrator ==
A 32-year-old Rotterdam resident was arrested after the shootings. He was identified by Dutch authorities as Fouad Lakhlili from Rotterdam (born 11 February 1991 in Utrecht), a student of the Erasmus University medical school, and had previously been convicted of animal cruelty. He was described by prosecutors as showing signs of "psychotic behavior" in a warning sent to the hospital prior to the shooting.

Neighbors of the suspect claimed that there had been repeated behavior that had been reported to police, but every time police came by the curtains would be closed and the suspect would never open his door. An email sent by the Dutch public prosecution service to the teaching hospital that he attended which described this behavior, was posted by the suspect to an online forum. In the forum he described himself as an alcoholic and claimed that he was unable to finish his degree due to teachers "sabotaging" him.

He had been required by Erasmus University to undergo a psychological evaluation before potentially receiving his medical degree, according to Stefan Sleijfer, chairman of the Board of Directors of Erasmus University Medical Center and Dean of the Faculty of Medicine. Sleijfer stated that the Public Prosecution Service had raised concerns about whether the man was suitable to receive a medical degree.

On 21 February 2025, Fouad Lakhlili was convicted and sentenced to life imprisonment for the shootings.

== Aftermath ==
Classes were canceled at Erasmus University Medical Center and students were invited to gather near the building involved to hold a memorial and mourn.

== Reactions ==
Rotterdam's mayor Ahmed Aboutaleb called the incidents a "pitch-black day" for the city, while outgoing Prime Minister Mark Rutte expressed his condolences to those affected. Minister of Justice and Security Dilan Yeşilgöz-Zegerius expressed her condolences and thanked the emergency services for their efforts and action.

== See also ==
- Alphen aan den Rijn shopping mall shooting (2011)
- Utrecht tram shooting (2019)
