= Olli =

- Ollimania character
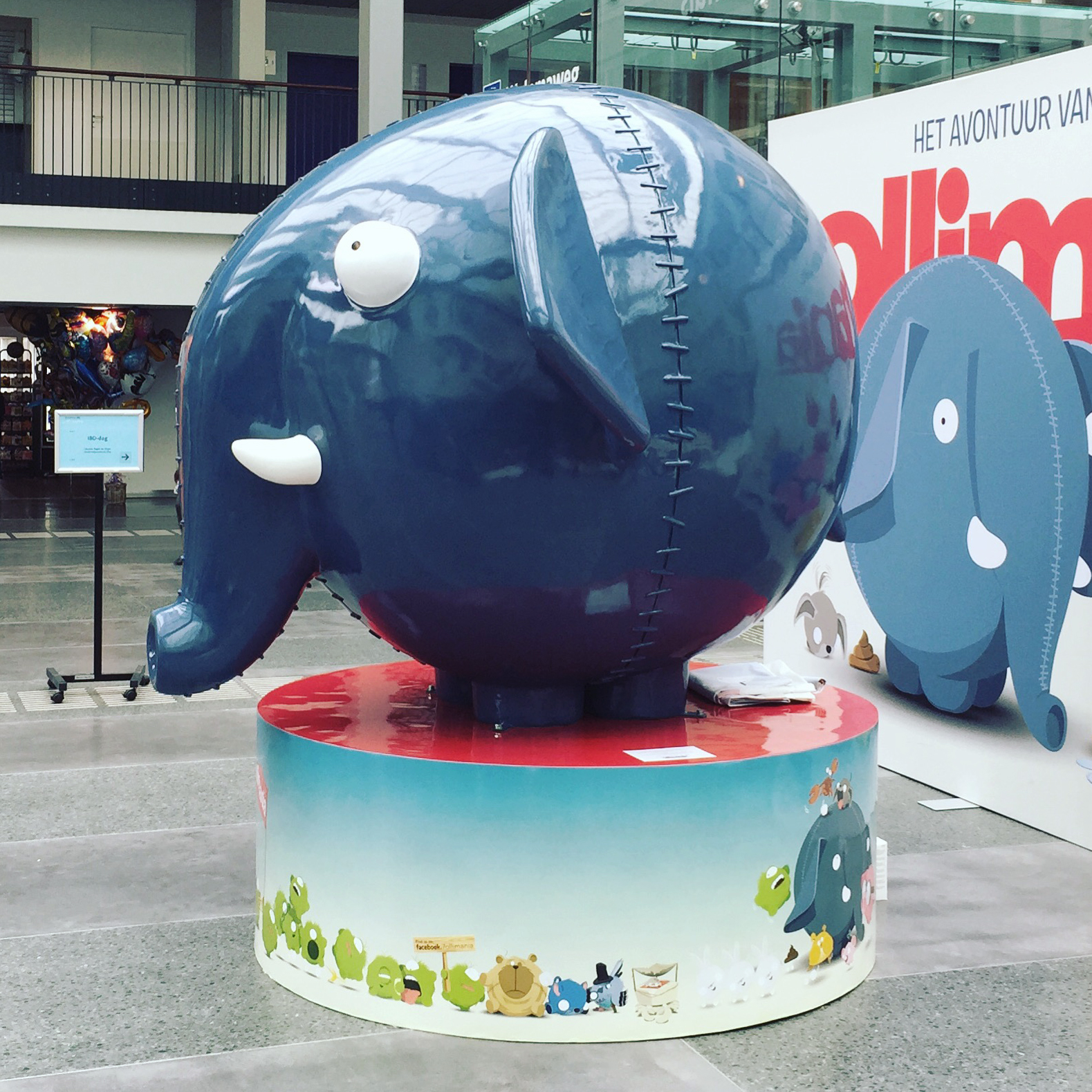
- Olli in the Erasmus MC
- First appearance: 14 November 2004
- Created by: Hein Mevissen; Diederiekje Bok
- Developed by: Ollimania; Hein Mevissen Diederiekje Bok

In-universe information
- Species: Elephant
- Family: Ollimania Family
- Nationality: Dutch

Olli is a Dutch children's book character and a stuffed toy. The character Olli was created in 2004 by Dutch designer and film director Hein Mevissen along with writer Diederiekje Bok as a character for a bottled mineral water. Olli was one of the many characters used on the packages and posters of the bottled water brand and John's Phone. Olli was launched at a party of MTV In Rotterdam in 2004. In 2013, Olli was again part of a campaign, this time to save the Rotterdam Zoo Diergaarde Blijdorp. Olli is part of the Ollimania family which is the company that created and owns all characters. After the launch, Olli became the symbol of Rotterdam and a mascot for professional football club Feyenoord. On 10 September 2015, Ollimania and its creators Hein Mevissen and Diederiekje Bok donated a huge Olli statue to the Sophia children's hospital in Rotterdam.

== Books ==
The first two Ollimania books were launched in October 2014. 'Olli en het poepkanon' and 'Olli is een olifant'. Both books made it into the top 10 of best sold children books in the Netherlands. In June 2015 Ollimania published two new books called 'Olli en de woestijndraak' and 'Olli op reis'.

- 2014 – Olli en het poepkanon (Leopold) (Dutch)
- 2014 – Olli is een olifant (Leopold) (Dutch and German)
- 2015 – Olli en de woestijndraak (Leopold) (Dutch and English)
- 2015 – Olli gaat op reis (Leopold) (Dutch)
- 2015 – Olli and the pudding rocket (Leopold) (Dutch and English)
- 2015 – Een kusje voor Tutje (Leopold) (Dutch)
- 2016 - Olli droomt (Leopold) (Dutch and English)
- 2016 – Olli wordt later (Leopold) (Dutch)
- 2016 – Sugar Mousey It's always about love Ollimania (English)
- 2016 – Hello Olli (Ollimania) (English)
- 2016 - Olli ce hero's (Ollimania) (French, German and English)
- 2016 – The art of Ollimania(Ollimania) (English)
- 2017 – Happy Ollidays(Ollimania) (English) (Dutch) (French)
- 2017 – My Big Hero (Ollimania) (English) (Dutch) (French)
- 2018 – The old forest (Ollimania) (English) (Dutch)
- 2018 - De fantastische reis van de geluksbrenger (Ollimania) (Dutch and English)

== Big Olli ==
There are two big Ollies. They are the elder version of small Olli. The Big Olli is a special creature model made for several charities. One is a permanent hard plastic polyester statue at the Sophia Children's hospital and another one has a temporarily place at the Rotterdam Zoo. The big Olli that is used in the short film to save the Rotterdam ZOO is stored at a secret location according to the creators.

== Fictional character biography ==
Olli is a toy elephant grown to the size of a real elephant. Olli is a lovable character with furry friends living in a fantasy world. In 2013, the story was expanded that he was the favorite toy of association football player Giovanni van Bronckhorst. Together they are the main cast of a short film. In Rotterdam, Netherlands of 1980, Giovanni van Bronckhorst is a little boy (played in the short film by the son of Giovanni van Bronckhorst). One day, he discovers a stuffed Elephant at the Rotterdam Zoo and grows attached to it. The name of the elephant is Olli. Giovanni takes him everywhere he goes, especially when he plays football. One day during a game, he loses Olli in the river the Maas in Rotterdam. 28 years later in 2013, Giovanni became an association football Player and trainer of Feyenoord, and Olli, also grew big, reunite again.

== Background ==
Hein Mevissen and Diederiekje Bok have a history in creating things that help people. To give something back to society and convince big brands to do so too. Olli was a few times part of a strategy they developed in 2004 and created Olli as a separate brand to generate awareness and in one campaign to generate more traffic and money for Blijdorp Zoo in Rotterdam.

== Copyright infringement ==
In 2015, John Doe BV of Olli sued insurance company ASR Nederland in summary proceedings for systematically infringing their copyright. ASR Nederland unlawfully used drawings and photos that they retrieved from the Ollimania website and used without permission to sell their insurance policies. The judge ruled in John Doe's favor and banned ASR Nederland from using images of Olli for their benefit any longer. John Doe suggested to ASR Nederland to return the Olli's that the insurance company had withheld to Diergaarde Blijdorp. ASR Nederland was allowed to decide for itself what to do with the withheld Olli's and chose not to return them to Blijdorp Zoo.

== Awards ==
In December 2013 Hein Mevissen and Diederiekje Bok of John Doe got awarded with the highest Dutch advertising award the Golden Loeki for this campaign. The agency John Doe got the award in a Live television show from Arian Buurman, CEO of the Stichting Ether Reclame who hosts the Loeki awards.
