= Cool, Rotterdam =

Coordinates: 51°55′10″N 4°28′32″E

Cool
- Neighborhood of Rotterdam
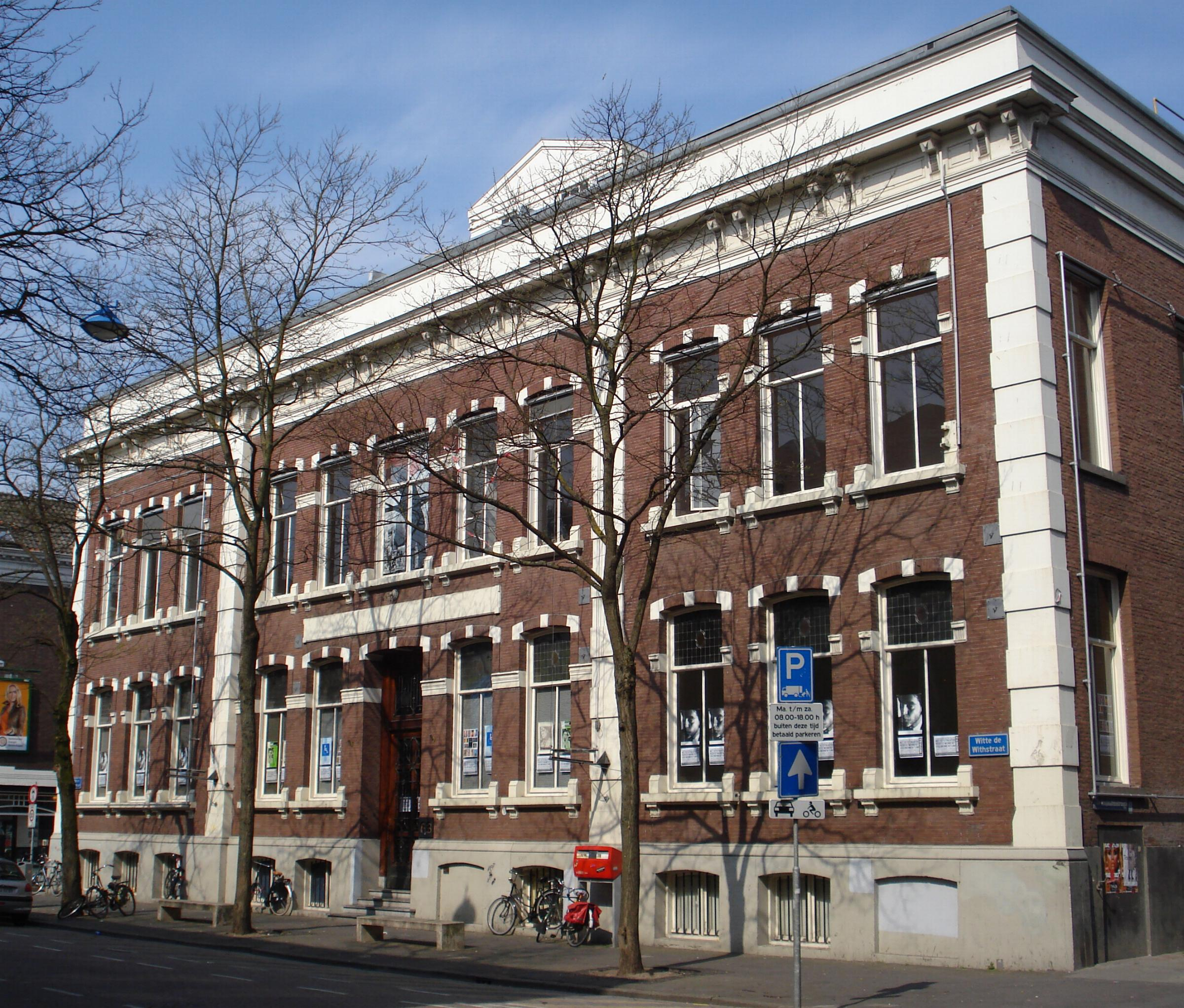
- Rotterdam witte de withstraat
- Interactive map of Cool
- Country: Netherlands
- Province: South Holland
- COROP: Rijnmond
- City: Rotterdam
- Borough: Centrum
- Time zone: UTC+1 (CET)

Cool (Dutch pronunciation: [koːl]) is a neighborhood of Rotterdam, Netherlands in the Centrum borough. It is enclosed by the Weena in the north, the Mauritsweg and Eendrachtsweg in the west, Vasteland in the south and the Coolsingel and Schiedamse Vest in the east.

== History ==
The name Cool is first mentioned in 1280. In 1816, the independent municipality of Cool was annexed by the city of Rotterdam. During the Rotterdam Blitz in 1940, much of the district was destroyed, but some streets survived—including Oude Binnenweg and Witte de Withstraat.

== Places of interest ==
- Coolsingel, a busy street on which the City Hall and the old main post office are located.
- De Bijenkorf, a department store.
- De Doelen, a concert venue and convention centre.
- Lijnbaan, a pedestrianised shopping street opened in 1953.
- Witte de With Center for Contemporary Art
- WORM, a cultural centre.
