= Scheepvaartkwartier =

The Scheepvaartkwartier or Nieuwe Werk is a neighborhood located on the banks of the Nieuwe Maas river in Rotterdam, the Netherlands. The Scheepvaartkwartier is among the top 20 wealthiest neighborhoods in the Netherlands. The northern boundary of the neighborhood is the Westzeedijk, to the east lies the Zalmhaven and Zalmstraat, to the south are the Willemskade, Westerkade, and Parkkade, and to the west is the Parkhaven. The Veerhaven and the nearby monumental buildings around the Parklaan, dating back to around 1900, form the heart of the Scheepvaartkwartier. The Caland Monument, dedicated to engineer Pieter Caland, is located on the Veerkade. The white, grand buildings on the Westerkade (originally Javastraat and Zeemansstraat), dating back to around 1865, are among the most beautiful in the neighborhood.

The Scheepvaartkwartier is a protected cityscape and, as a result, a national monument. With 98 out of more than 500 national monuments in Rotterdam, the Scheepvaartkwartier is a treasure trove of cultural heritage. The Scheepvaartkwartier is part of the city area located outside the dikes (buitendijks) in Rotterdam.

== History ==
The Scheepvaartkwartier was designed as a systematically planned city district around 1840 by the city architect W.N. Rose. This new urban area was named the Nieuwe Werk and was subdivided with the Veerhaven as its most prominent feature. Originally, the Westerhaven was also part of this area, but it was filled in and eliminated in 1910. The neighborhood attracted several wealthy Rotterdam residents, such as coal merchant D.G. van Beuningen and banker Marten Mees.

During the bombing of Rotterdam in May 1940, the Scheepvaartkwartier remained largely untouched, with only the easternmost block of the neighborhood, adjacent to the Leuvehaven near the Willemsplein, being affected. Due to the availability of intact housing, the Scheepvaartkwartier became the center of the German occupation forces in Rotterdam during the Second World War. The Ortskommandant and Feldgendarmerie were situated at the Parklaan, while the Kriegsmarine, Reichsbahn, and Hafenkommandant were stationed at the Veerhaven. The Sicherheitsdienst was located on the Westzeedijk. The neighborhood also housed a military hospital (Kriegslazaret), a German secondary school, and an officer's casino. The current Natuurhistorisch Museum served as the Rotterdam base for the NSDAP, including the Hitler Youth. The intersection of 's Gravendijkwal and Rochussenstraat was home to 'Brauhaus Monopole', a large German beer hall. Sociëteit 'de Maas' at the Veerhaven served as a Wehrmachtheim for the officers.

== Sculptures ==
The neighborhood is home to numerous architectural monuments, as well as a large number of sculptures and memorials, such as those at the Veerhaven dedicated to Jamin, Van Rijckevorsel, Mees, Van Beuningen, Van Hoboken, and Caland. At the Westerkade, there are sculptures of Peter the Great and Rose, while in Het Park, there are sculptures of Tollens and Queen Wilhelmina, and on the Parklaan, there is one of Willem Schürmann.

== Present ==
In the late 20th century, new construction took place, and exclusive restaurants established themselves in the neighborhood. The Zalmhaven was filled in 1991 to create the Erasmusbrug. To attract affluent residents back to the center of Rotterdam, luxury apartments were built near the entrance to the Erasmusbrug at the Willemsplein and Willemskade. The Scheepvaartkwartier is now among the top 20 wealthiest neighborhoods in the Netherlands. Restaurants like Parkheuvel (with two Michelin stars) and Zeezout (with one Michelin star) are among the top restaurants in the Netherlands. The neighborhood is also home to numerous law firms.

The seat of the Roman Catholic Diocese of Rotterdam is located on the Koningin Emmaplein. The Scheepvaartkwartier houses two museums: the Wereldmuseum (Willemskade) and the Belasting & Douane Museum (Parklaan). The Spido and Waterbus have their moorings at the Willemskade. The restored warehouse complex Westelijk Handelsterrein is also worth visiting.

A part of the neighborhood is a protected cityscape (beschermd stadsgezicht).

== Images ==
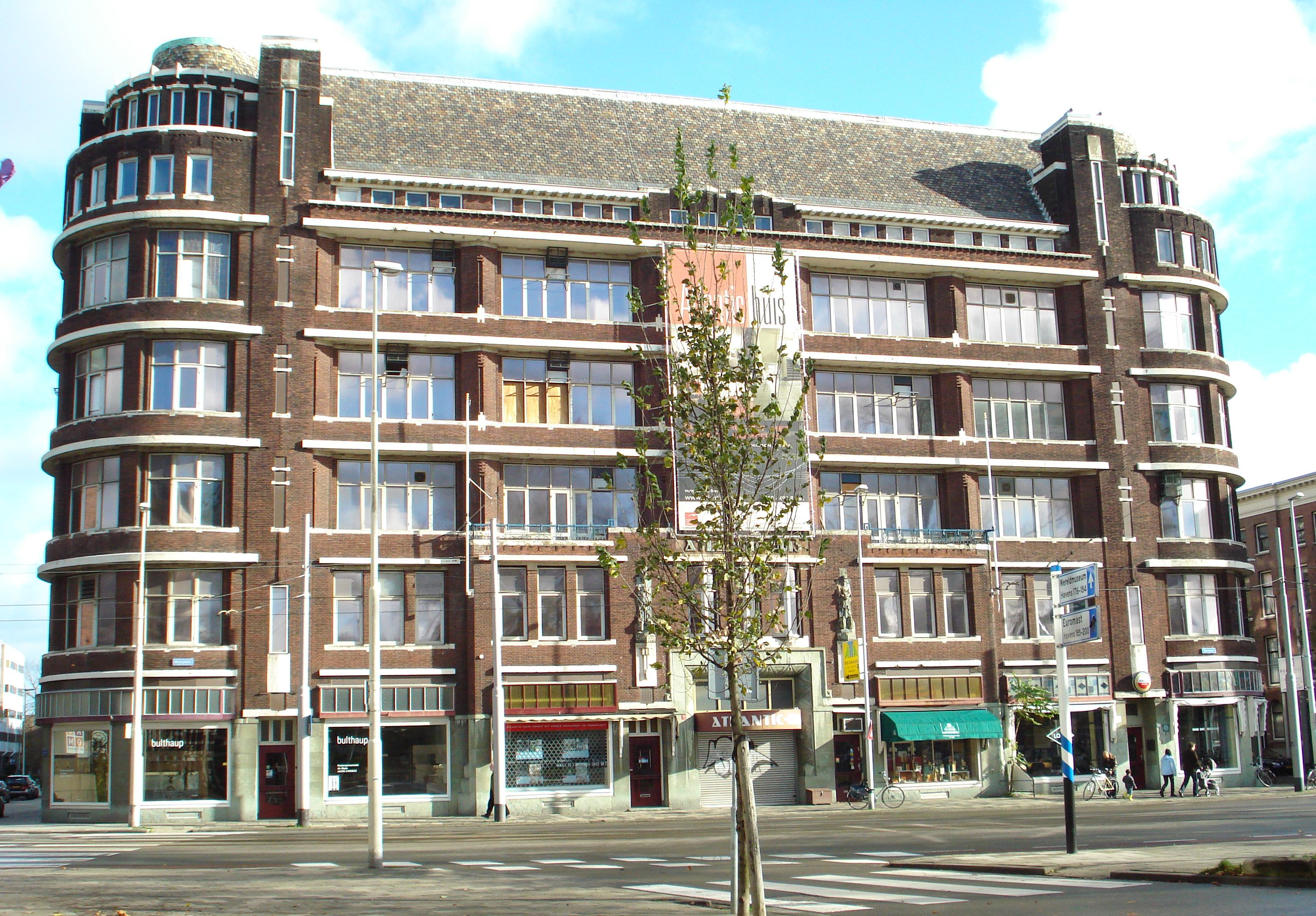
The Atlantic House at the Westplein

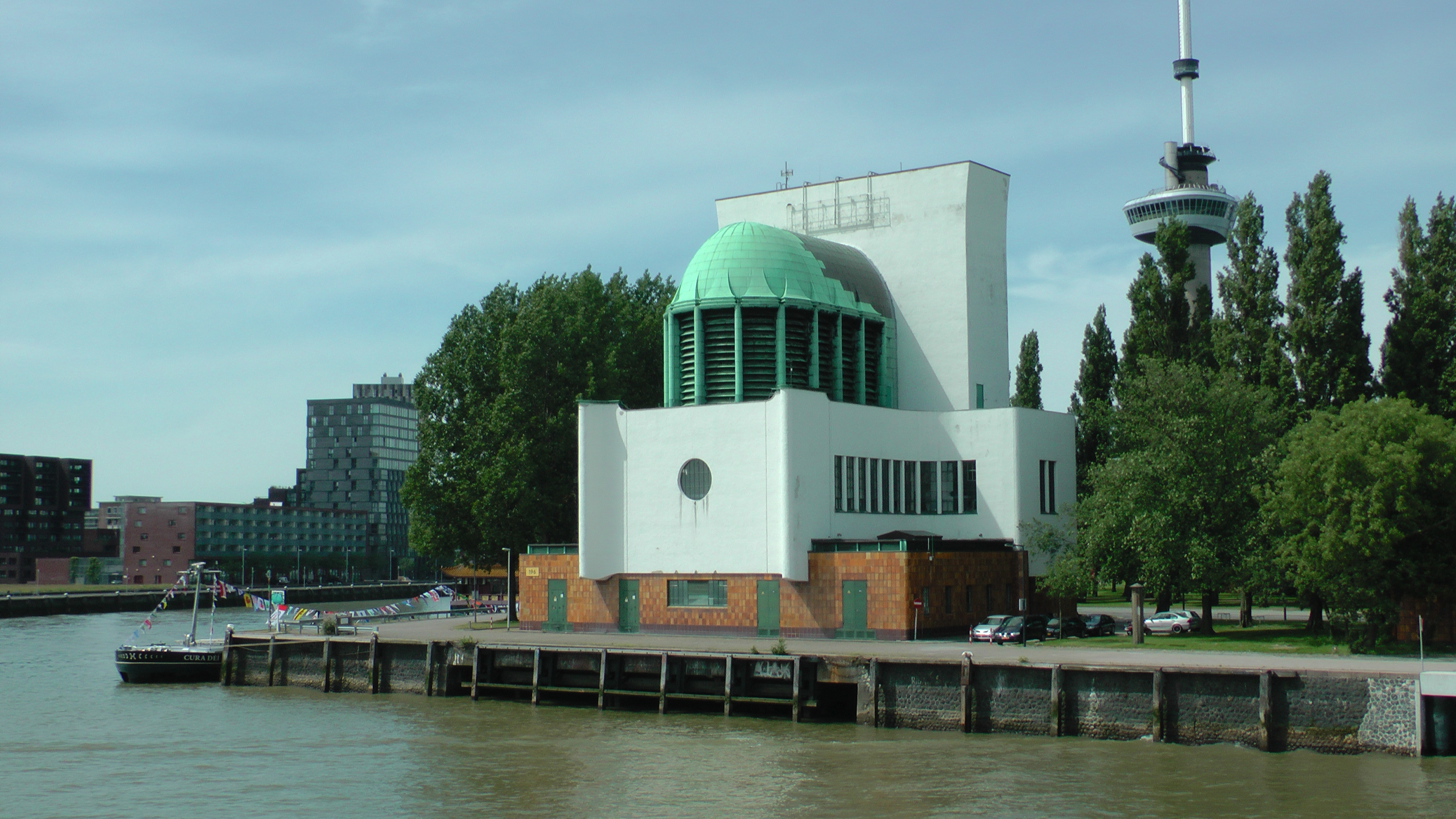
Ventilation building on the Parkkade, part of the Maastunnel. In the background, the Euromast.

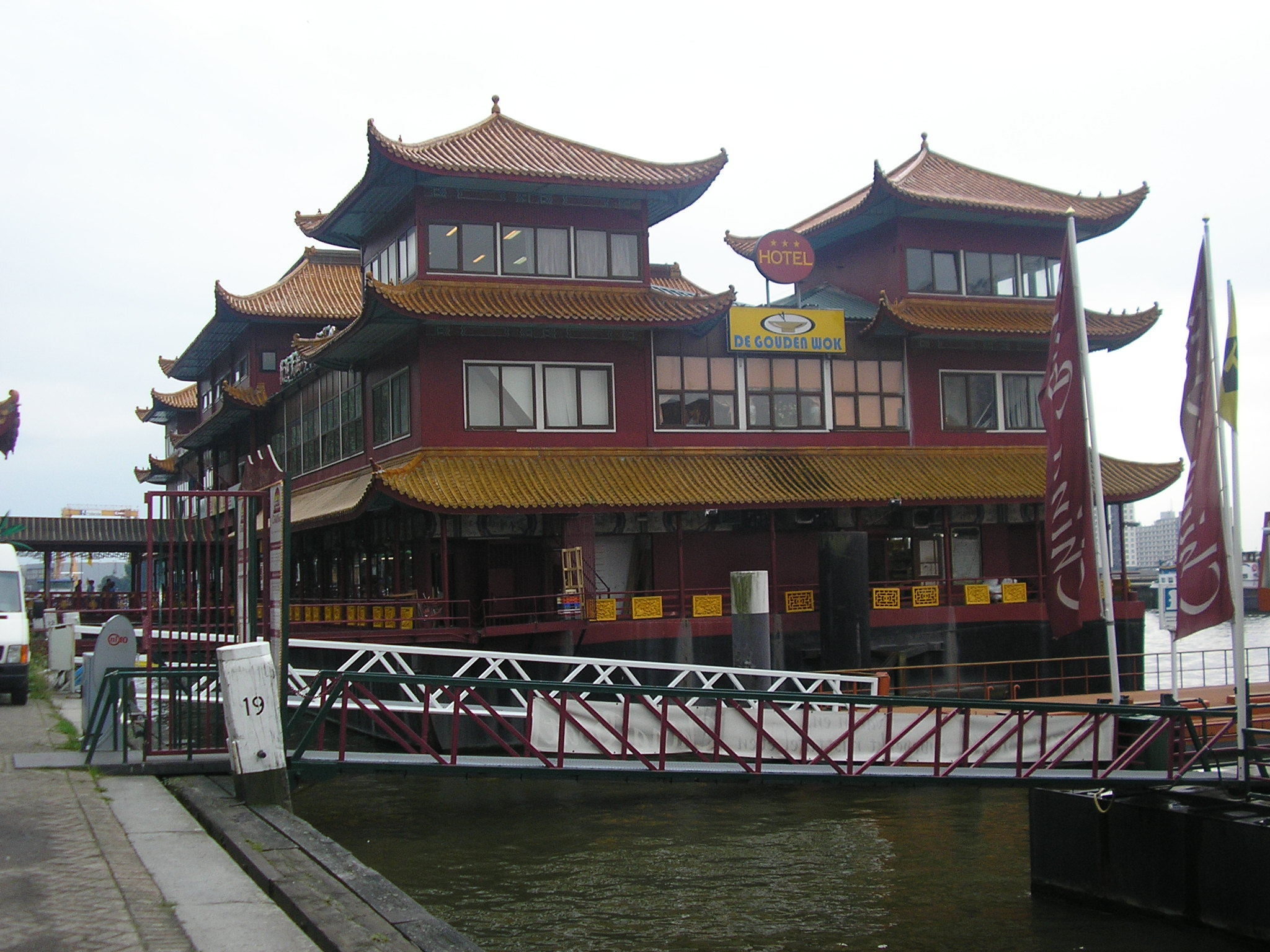
Chinese restaurant, hotel, and supermarket New Ocean Paradise at the Parkhaven.

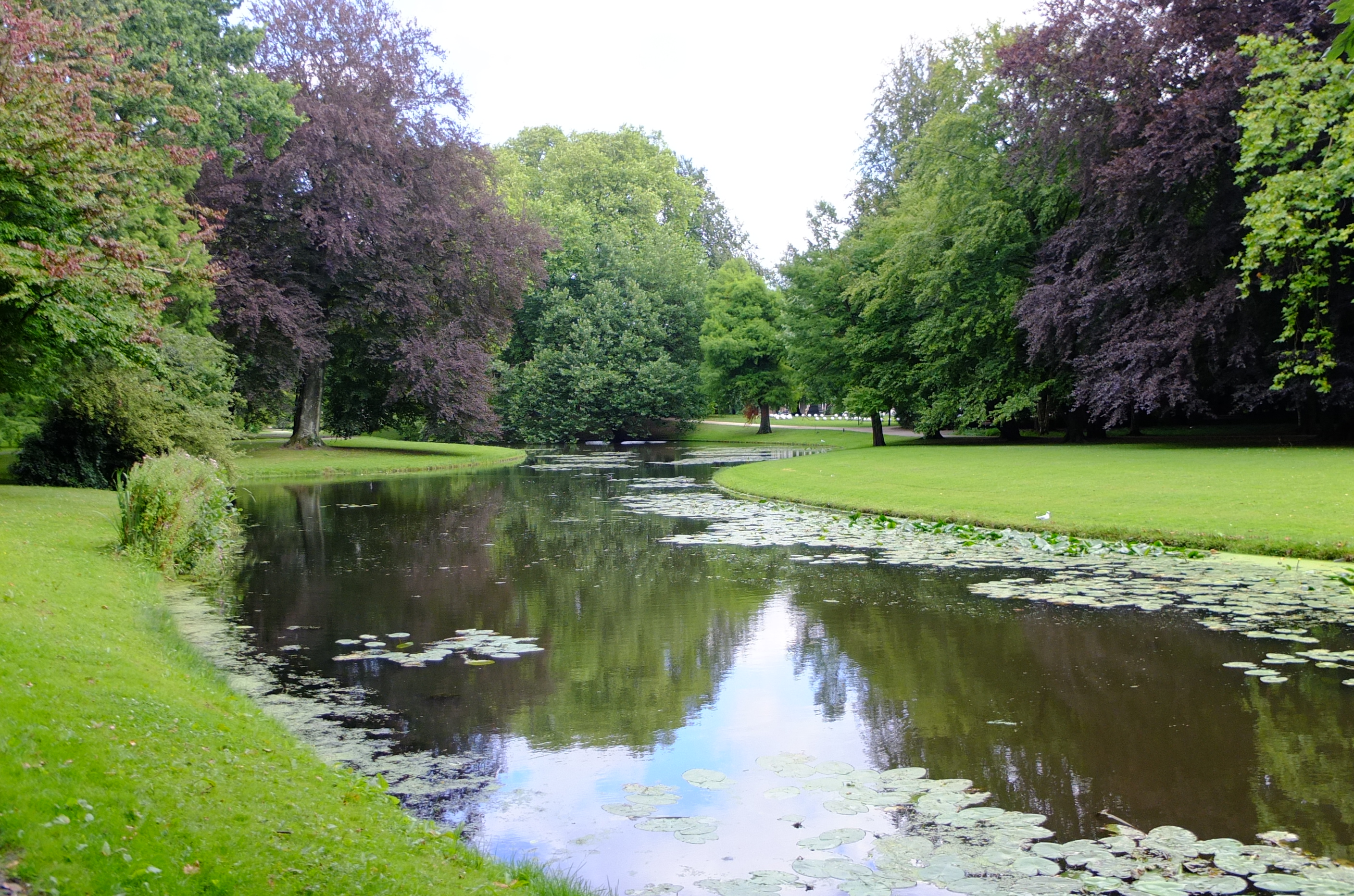
Het Park.

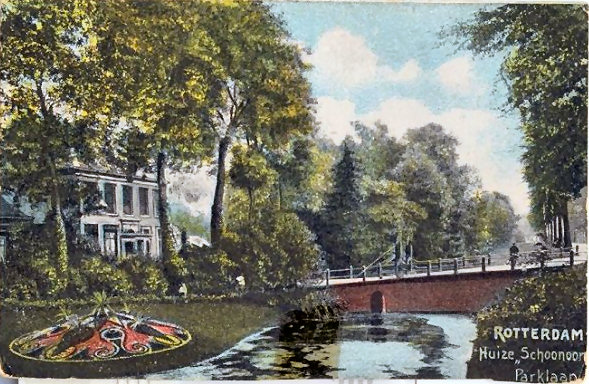
The former Huize Schoonoord on the Parklaan. Since 1973, the garden is freely accessible as Park Schoonoord.

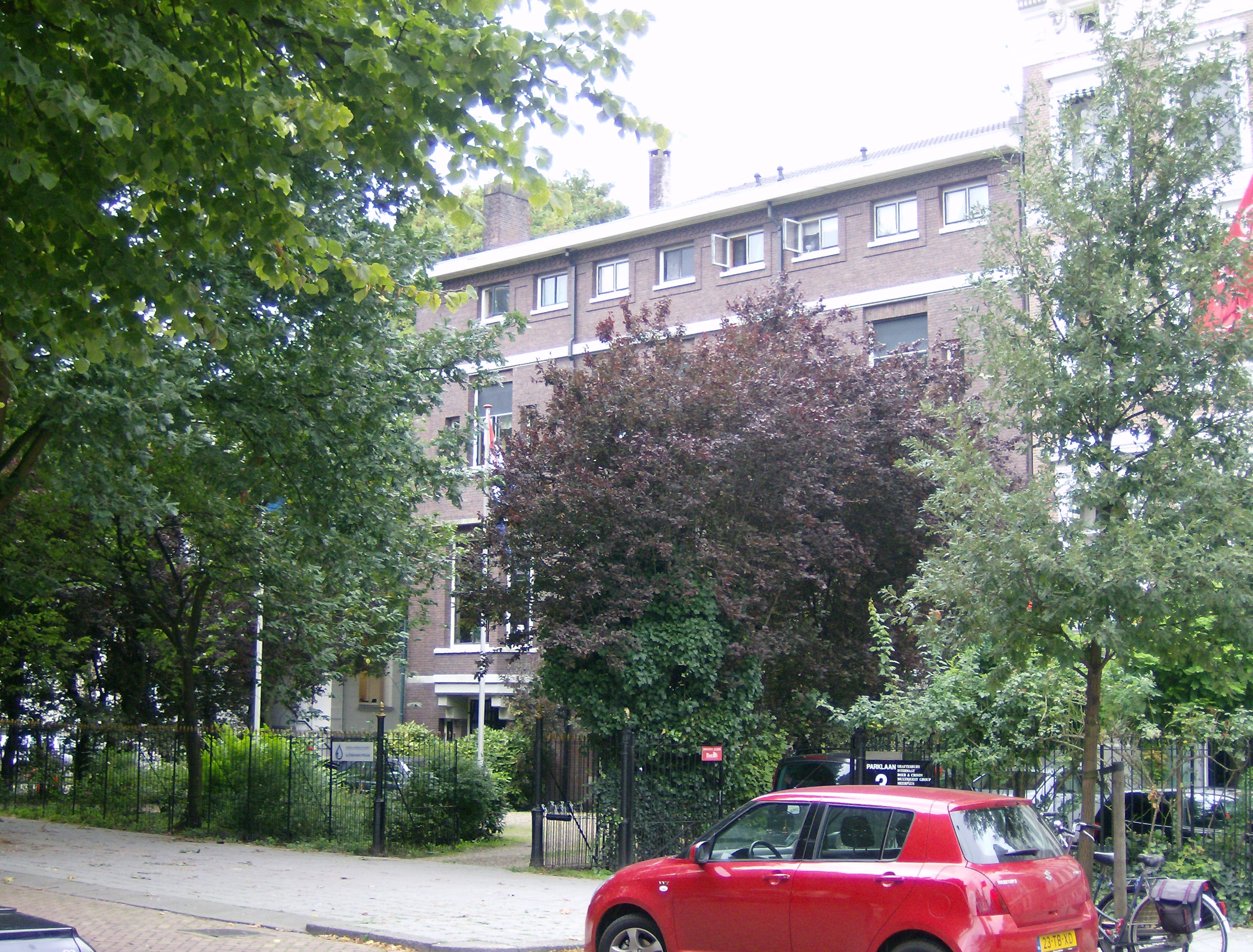
The Swedish Seamen's Church on the Parklaan.

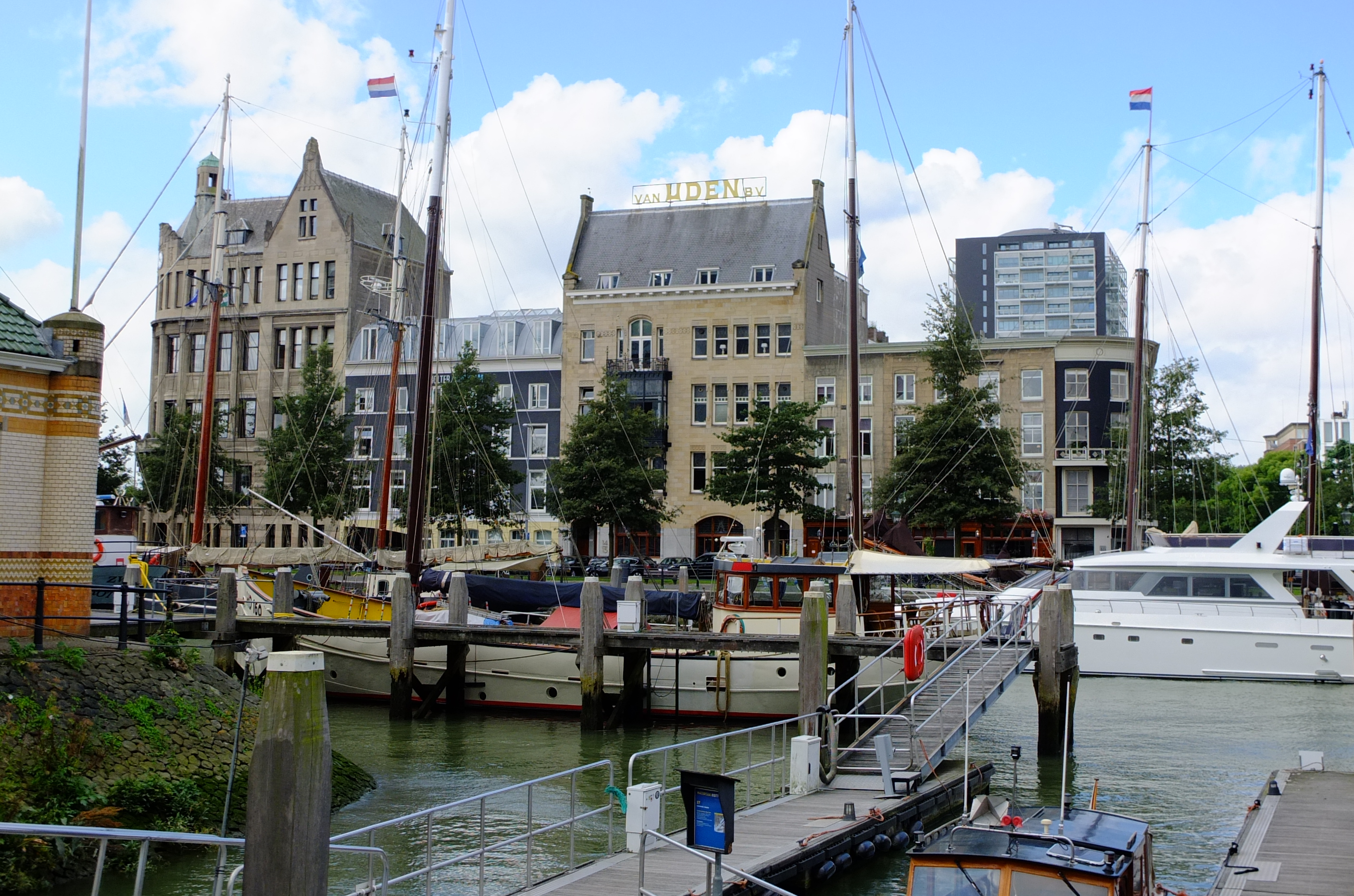
The Veerhaven with the listed buildings Westerkadehuis (left) and Van Uden (center).
- Scheepvaartkwartier Rotterdam - scheepvaartkwartier.net
- Rijksmonumenten in het Scheepvaartkwartier - top010.nl
