= Dijkzigt =

Coordinates: 51°54′42″N 4°28′20″E

- Neighborhood of Rotterdam
- Interactive map of Dijkzigt
- Country: Netherlands
- Province: South Holland
- COROP: Rotterdam
- Borough: Centrum
- Time zone: UTC+1 (CET)

Dijkzigt is a neighborhood of Rotterdam, Netherlands.
