= Coolsingel =

Street in central Rotterdam, Netherlands

Coordinates: 51°55′21.8″N 4°28′43.1″E

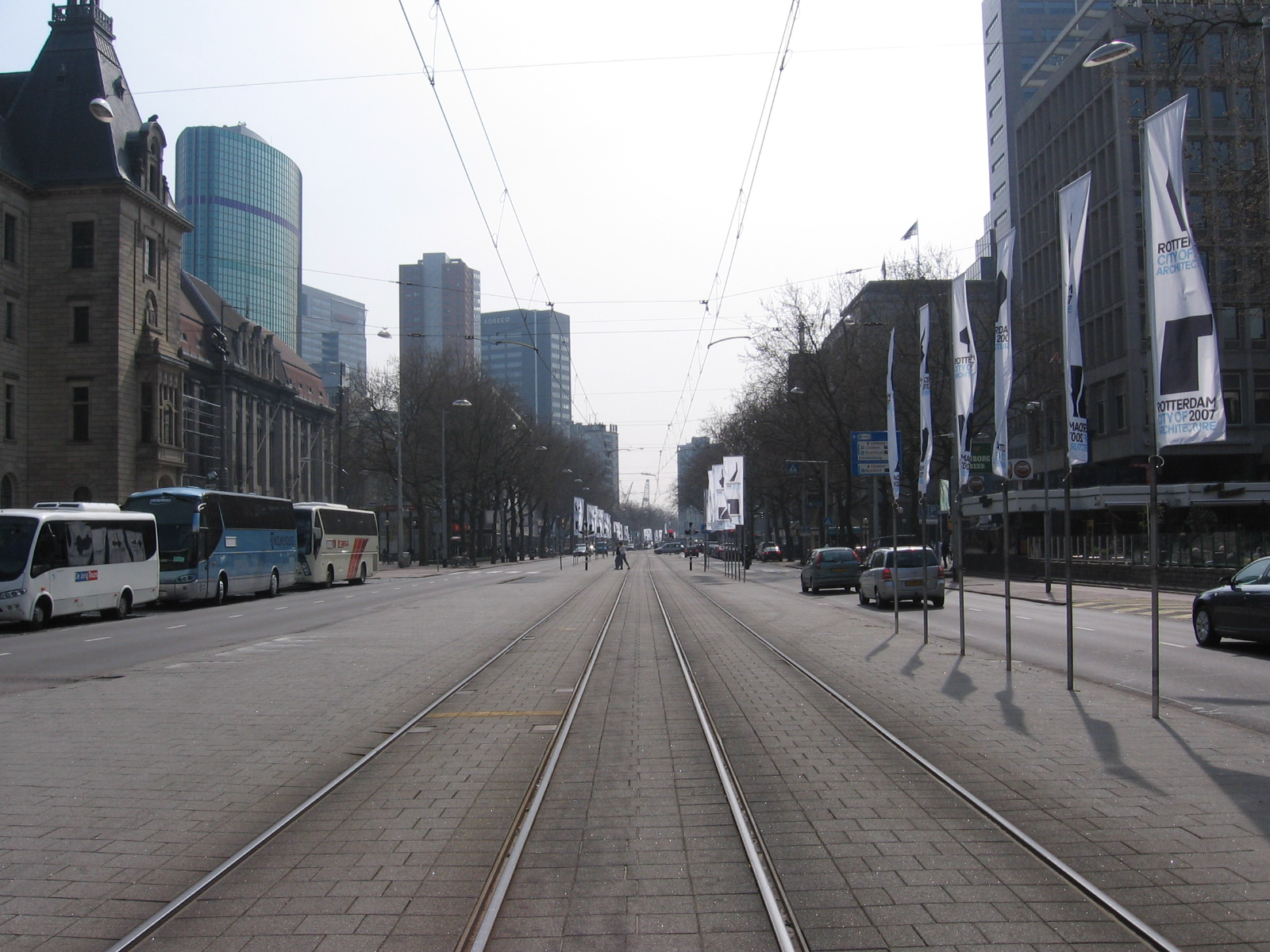
Coolsingel in 2007

Coolsingel is a street in central Rotterdam. It is located in the Cool district. The street leads from the Hofplein to the Churchillplein. Plans were announced in 2016 to reduce traffic congestion on the street. The redevelopment is expected to cost 47 million euros and to be finished by 2020. In 2021 the renovation was finished giving cyclists and pedestrians more space. Car traffic was reduced from 4 lanes (2 in each direction) to 2 lanes (1 in each direction).

== History ==
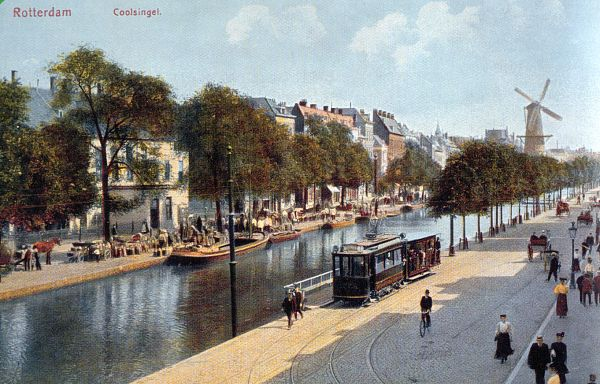
Coolsingel circa 1900

The name Coolsingel comes from the Cool craftsmanship (an area with a feudal form of government dating back to the Middle Ages, with a 'gentleman' as central person). The Cool craftsmanship can be traced back to around 1280. In 1596, the city bought the Cool, Blommersdijk and Beukelsdijk craftsmanship from Squire Jacob van Almonde. By Royal Decree of 20 September 1809, the craftsmanship Beukelsdijk, Oost- en West-Blommersdijk, called Cool, was elevated to an independent municipality. In 1811 Cool was annexed by Rotterdam. In addition to the craftsmanship, there was also the Cool polder. This lay between the Rotterdamse and Delfshavense Schie; this was abolished in 1925. Part of the territory of Cool had already been added to the city in 1358 after the permit of Duke Albert I, Duke of Bavaria to dig canals around the city and to enlarge the city area with Rodezand in the Cool craftsmanship. From then on, the Coolvest separated city and craftsmanship and formed the western border of the old city triangle, later extended to the south with the Schiedamse Vest. From 1879 until WW II (when it was destroyed), the first mall The Passage in The Netherlands ended on the Coolvest.

In 1480 there is already a canal on the craftsmanship side opposite the fortification behind Bulgersteyn; the southern part was given the name Schiedamsesingel, the northern Coolsingel, after the major urban expansion around 1500. The Coolvest was completely filled in as part of the construction of a wide road in the years 1913-1922 and was then given the name Coolsingel. A few years later, the Schiedamse Vest followed until the Witte de Withstraat, and finally the southernmost part of the vest was filled with debris from the German bombing of Rotterdam of 1940.

== Places of interest ==
- Beurs-World Trade Center
- City Hall
- McDonald's kiosk - voted the ugliest building in the city, the restaurant was given a complete refurbishment in 2015 and received international attention
- Old main post office
- Beurstraverse, popularly called 'Koopgoot' (sales gutter)
