= Grote or Sint-Laurenskerk (Rotterdam) =

Grote Kerk or Sint-Laurenskerk
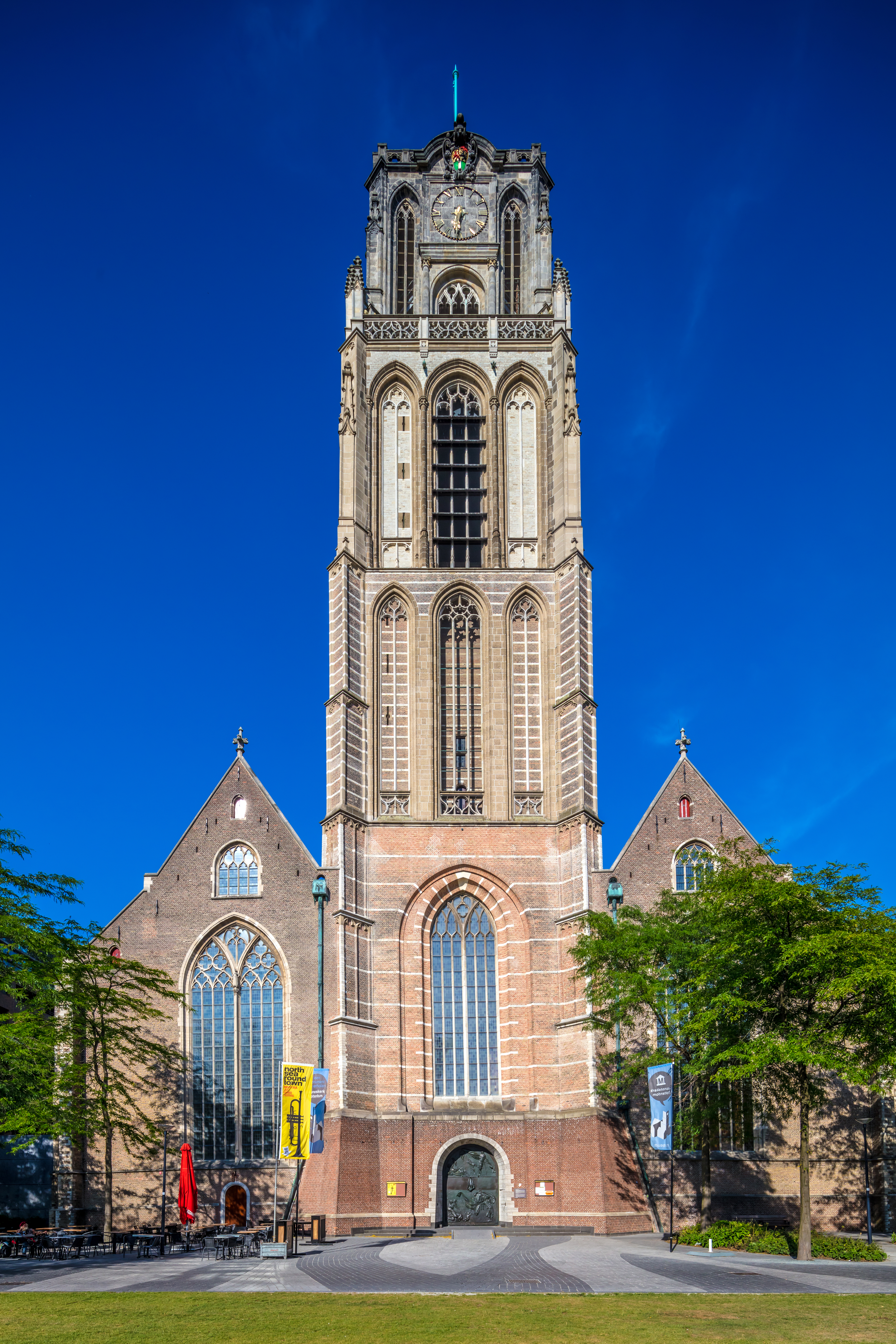
- Grote or Sint-Laurenskerk in 2007
- Grote Kerk or Sint-Laurenskerk
- 51°55′17″N 4°29′6″E
- Location: Rotterdam, Netherlands
- Denomination: Protestant Church in the Netherlands
- Previous denomination: Roman Catholic
- Tradition: Christian Protestant
- Website: www.laurenskerkrotterdam.nl

Administration
- District: Centrum

Grote Kerk or Sint-Laurenskerk (Dutch pronunciation: [ˈɣroːtə ʔɔf sɪnt ˈlʌurənsˌkɛr(ə)k]; English: Great, or St. Lawrence Church) is a Protestant church in Rotterdam, Netherlands. It is the only remnant of the medieval city of Rotterdam.

== History ==
The church was built as a Roman Catholic Church between 1449 and 1525. In 1621 a wooden spire was added to the tower, designed by Hendrick de Keyser. Poor quality of its wood caused the spire to be demolished in 1645. A stone cube was added to the tower, though it proved too heavy for the foundation in 1650. New piles were driven under the tower and in 1655 the tower stood straight again.

The basilica was the first all-stone building in Rotterdam. The last priest of the Laurenskerk was Hubertus Duifhuis. The Reformation took place in 1572 and the Laurenskerk became a Protestant church. Ministers of the church include Laurens Johannes Jacobus van Oosterzee, Abraham Hellenbroek, Jan Scharp and J. R. Callenbach, who wrote a book about the history of the church a few years before the Rotterdam Blitz. The church is still used for worship of the Protestant Church.

In the Rotterdam Blitz on May 14, 1940, the Laurenskerk was heavily damaged, with only the tower and walls surviving. At first there were calls to demolish the church, but that was stopped by Queen Wilhelmina. The provisional National Monuments Commission had both supporters and opponents of restoration. In particular, committee member and architect J. J. P. Oud opposed rebuilding in 1950 and presented an alternative plan which would preserve only the tower. Next to the memorial a new, smaller church would be built. This alternative plan was rejected, particularly because restoration of the Laurenskerk was viewed as a symbol of the resilience of Rotterdam's community. In 1952, Queen Juliana laid the foundation stone for the restoration, which was completed in 1968.

In 1971 the Laurenspastoraat community was established as part of the Reformed Church of Rotterdam in order to resume church services. The community received a Cross of Nails replica from Coventry Cathedral in order to become a local center for peace and reconciliation. In 1981 the liberal Maaskant/Open Grenzen community joined the church and since then the two communities alternate their services.

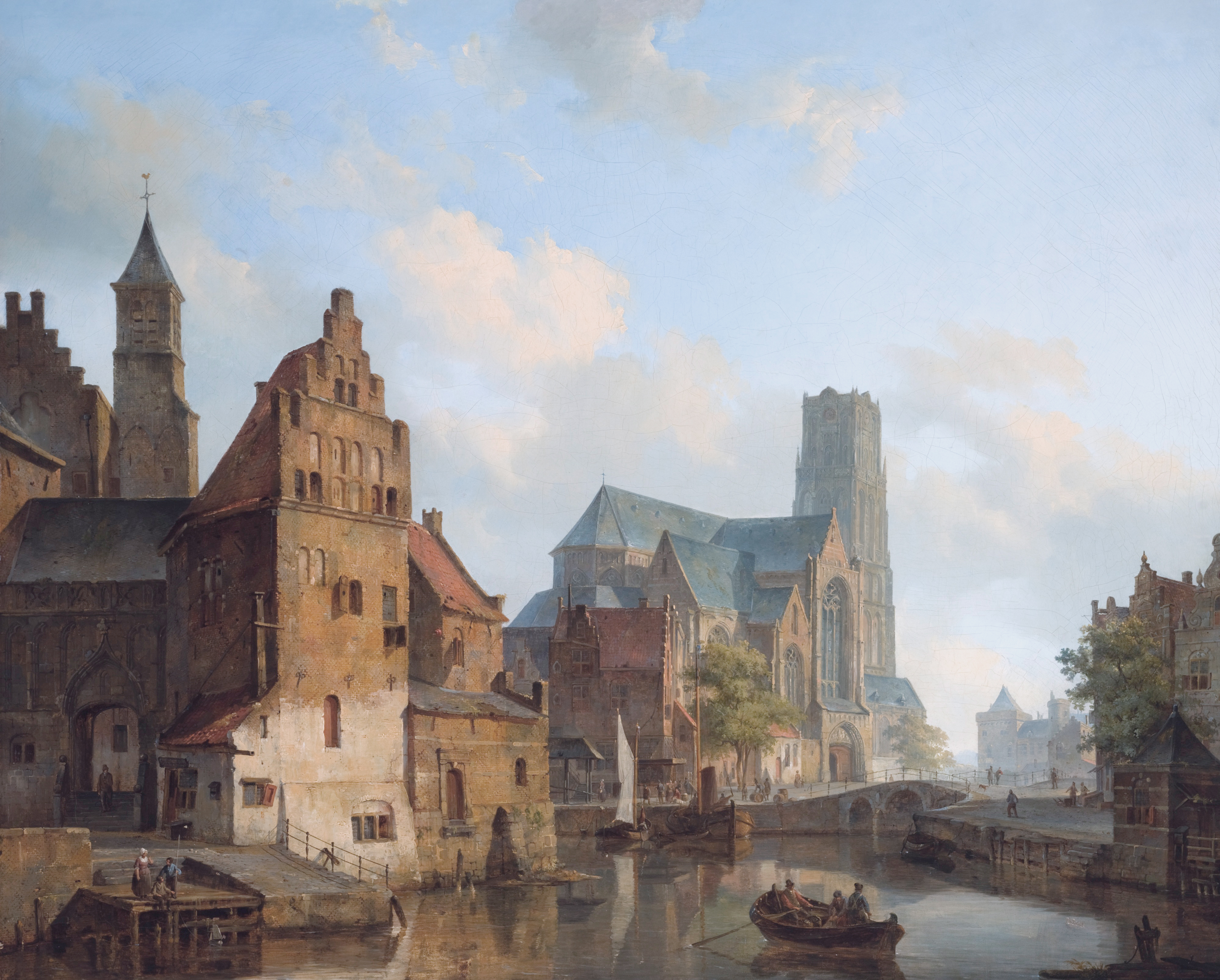
The church and its surroundings in c. 1621–1645

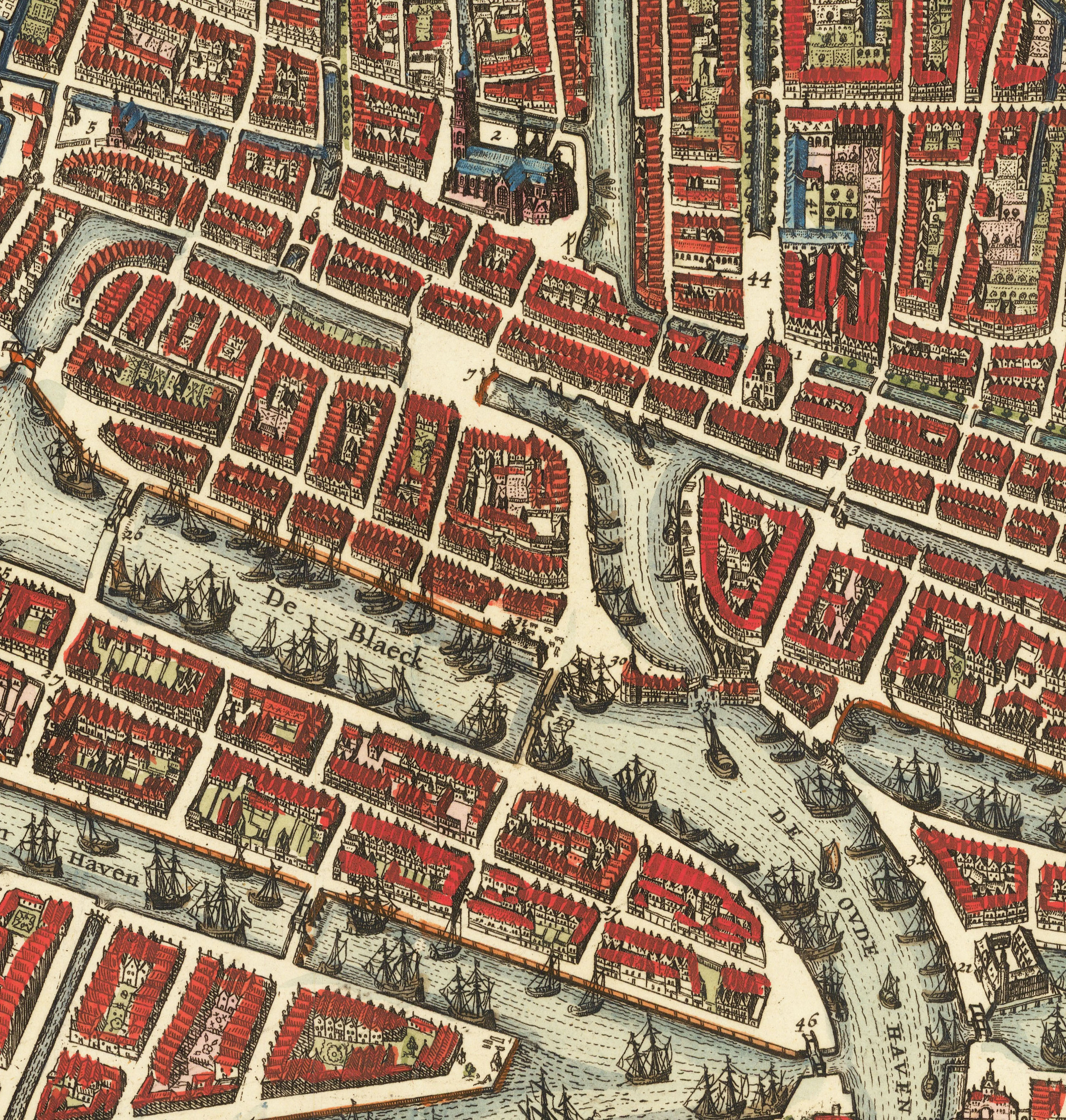
Map with Sint Laurenskerk in c. 1690

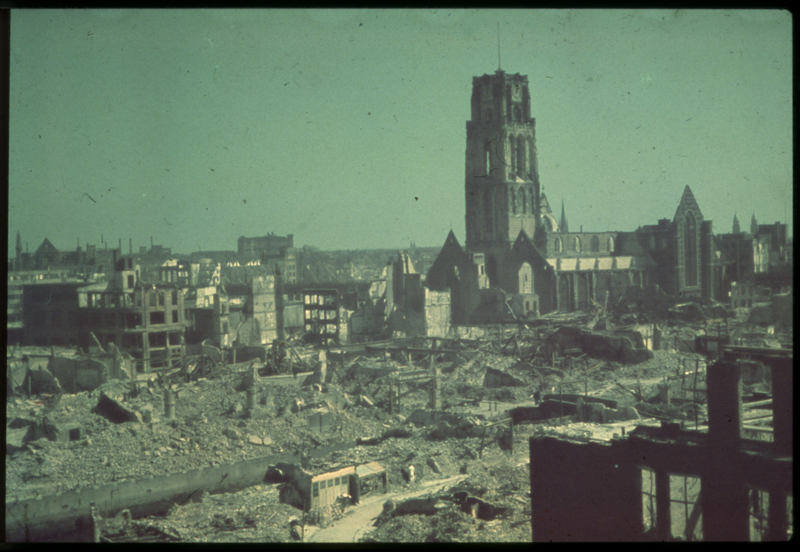
Rotterdam's city centre and the church after the bombing in 1940

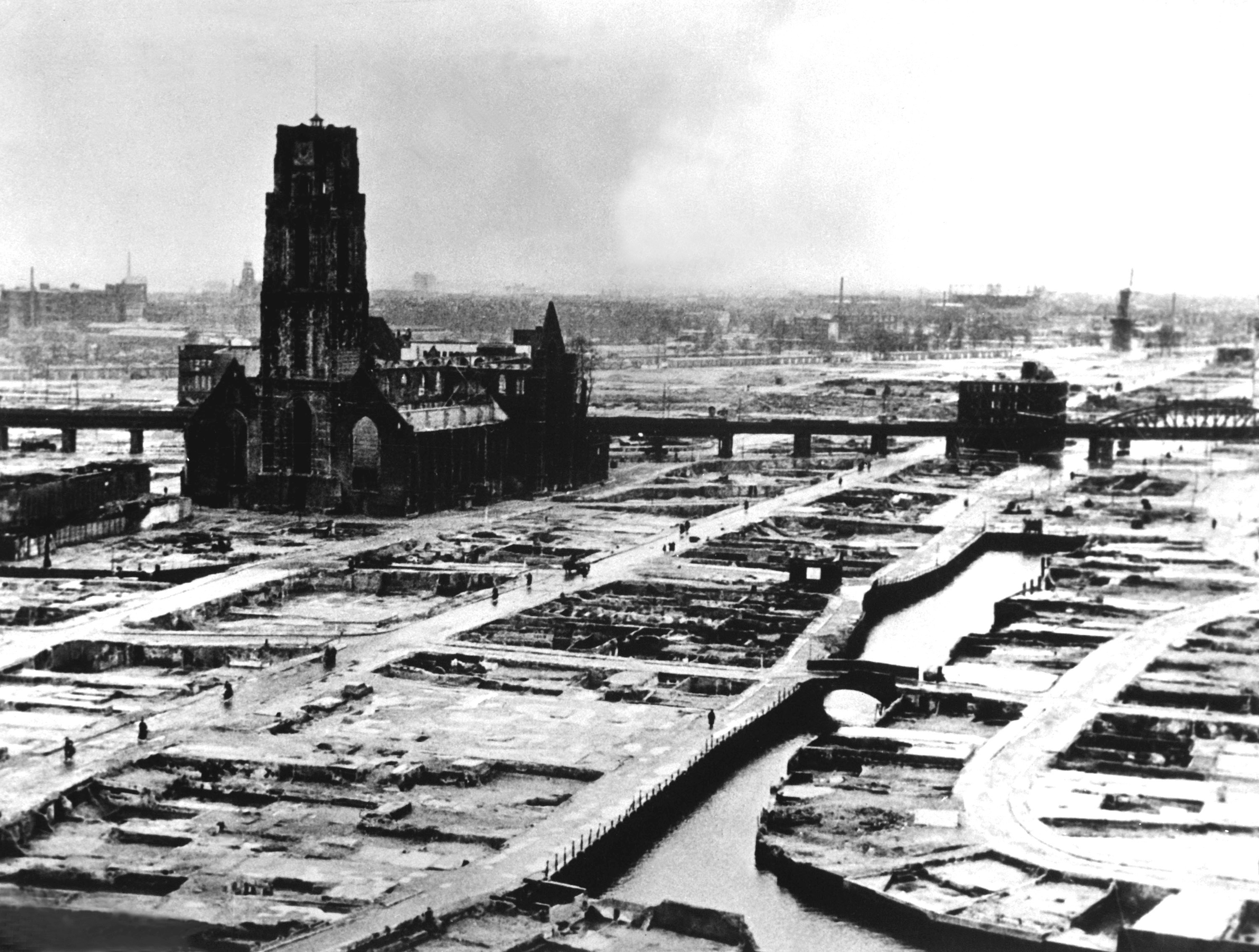
The church and its surroundings in c. 1943–1945

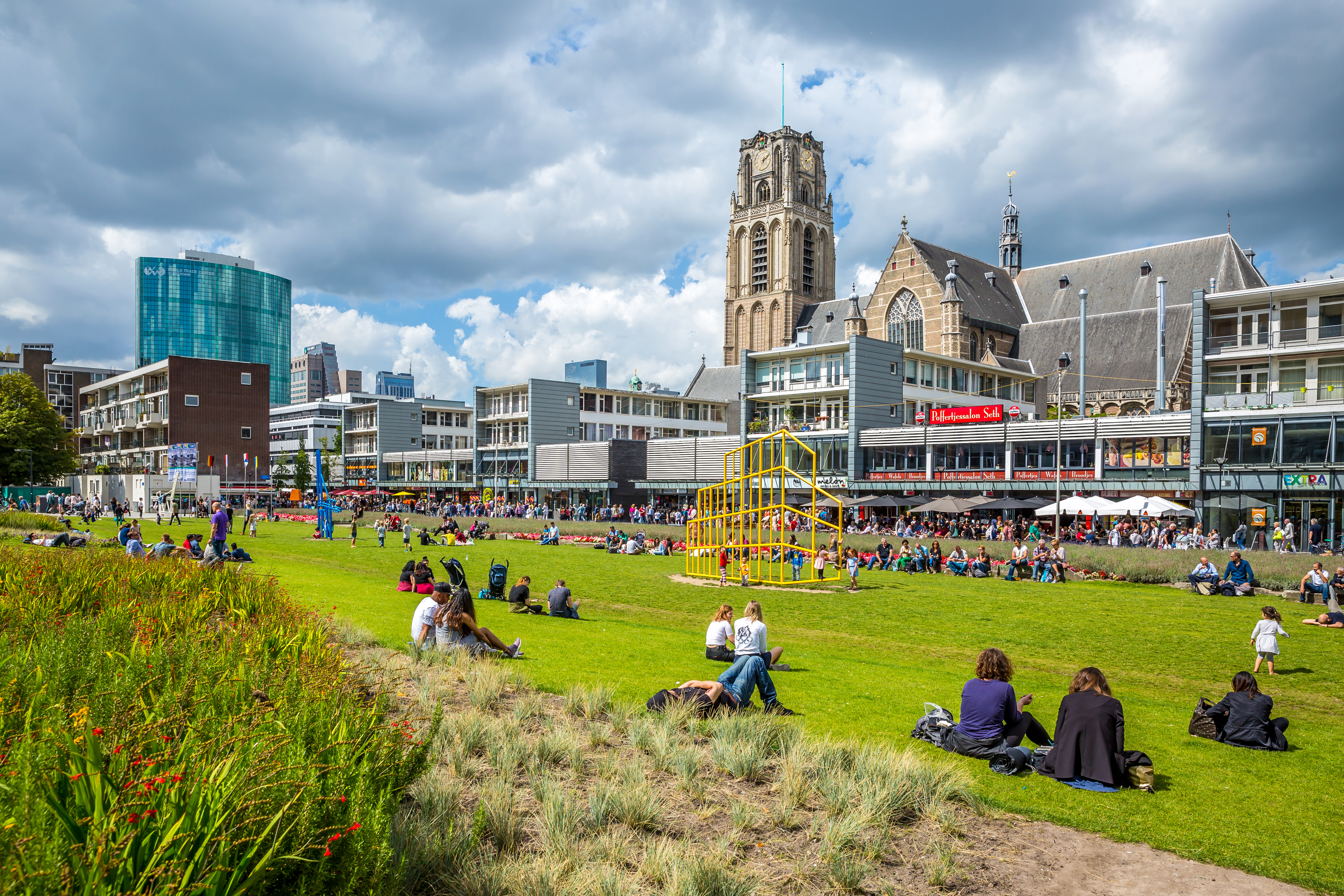
The church and its surroundings in 2018

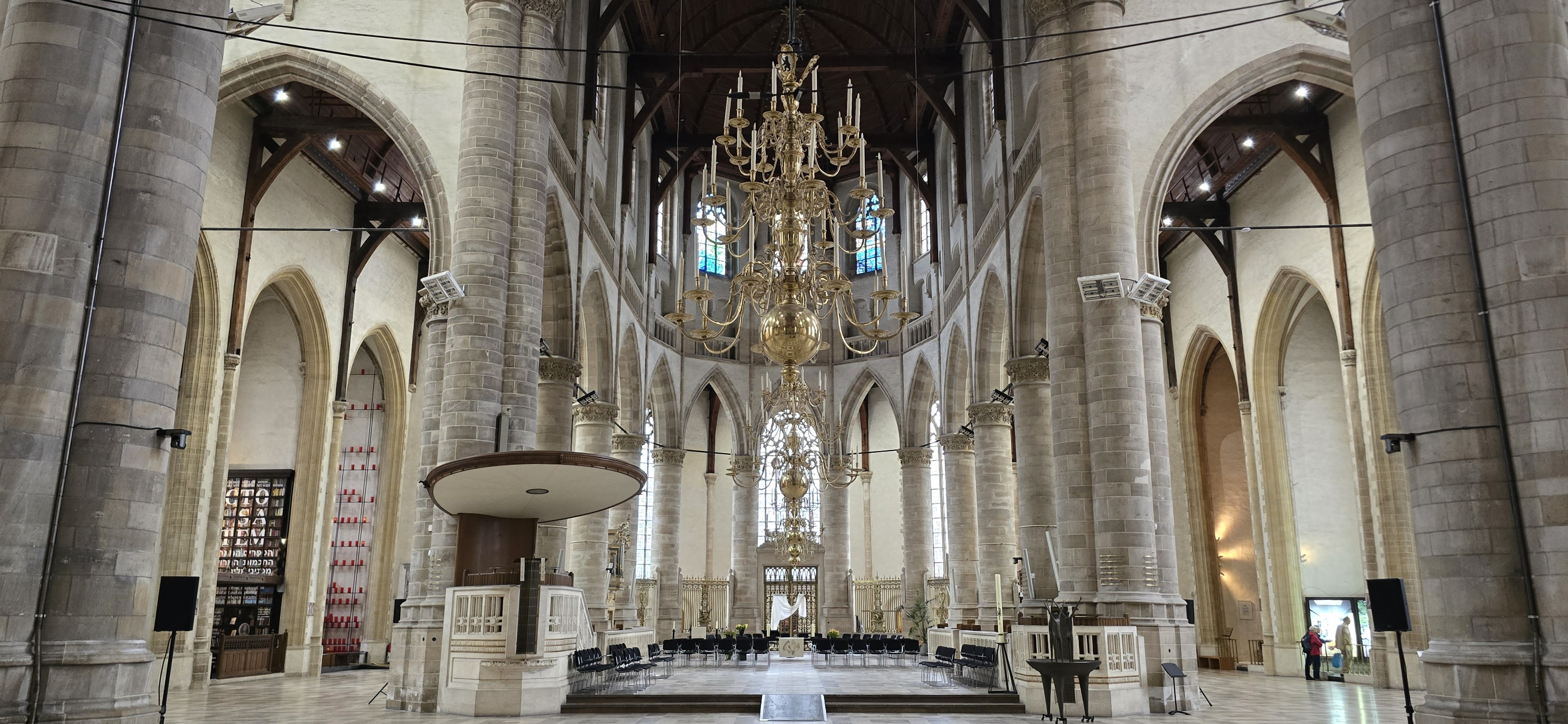
Interior view
