= Jo van den Broek =

Dutch architect (1898–1978)

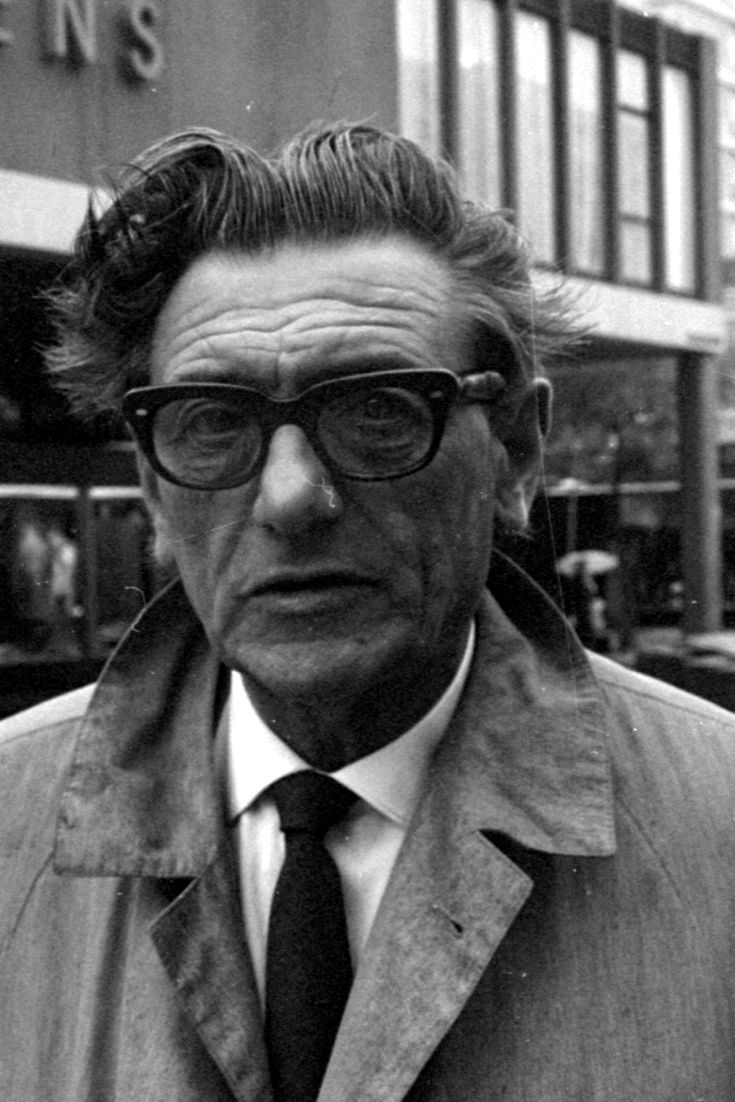
J.H. van den Broek, 1968

Johannes Hendrik van den Broek (Dutch pronunciation: [ˈjoː vɑn də(m) ˈbruk]; 4 October 1898 – 6 September 1978) was a Dutch architect influential in the rebuilding of Rotterdam after World War II. He is known for his work with Jaap Bakema, in their practice as Van den Broek en Bakema, and as one of the founders of Nieuwe Bouwen, the modernist movement in Dutch architecture.

== Early life and education ==
Johannes Hendrik van den Broek was born in Rotterdam on 4 October 1898.

== Career ==
Van den Broek joined Johannes Brinkman in 1936, after the death of Brinkman's partner Leendert van der Vlugt. The new firm was named Brinkman and Van den Broek Architects. Their work during this time including a new terminal building for the Holland-America cruise line.

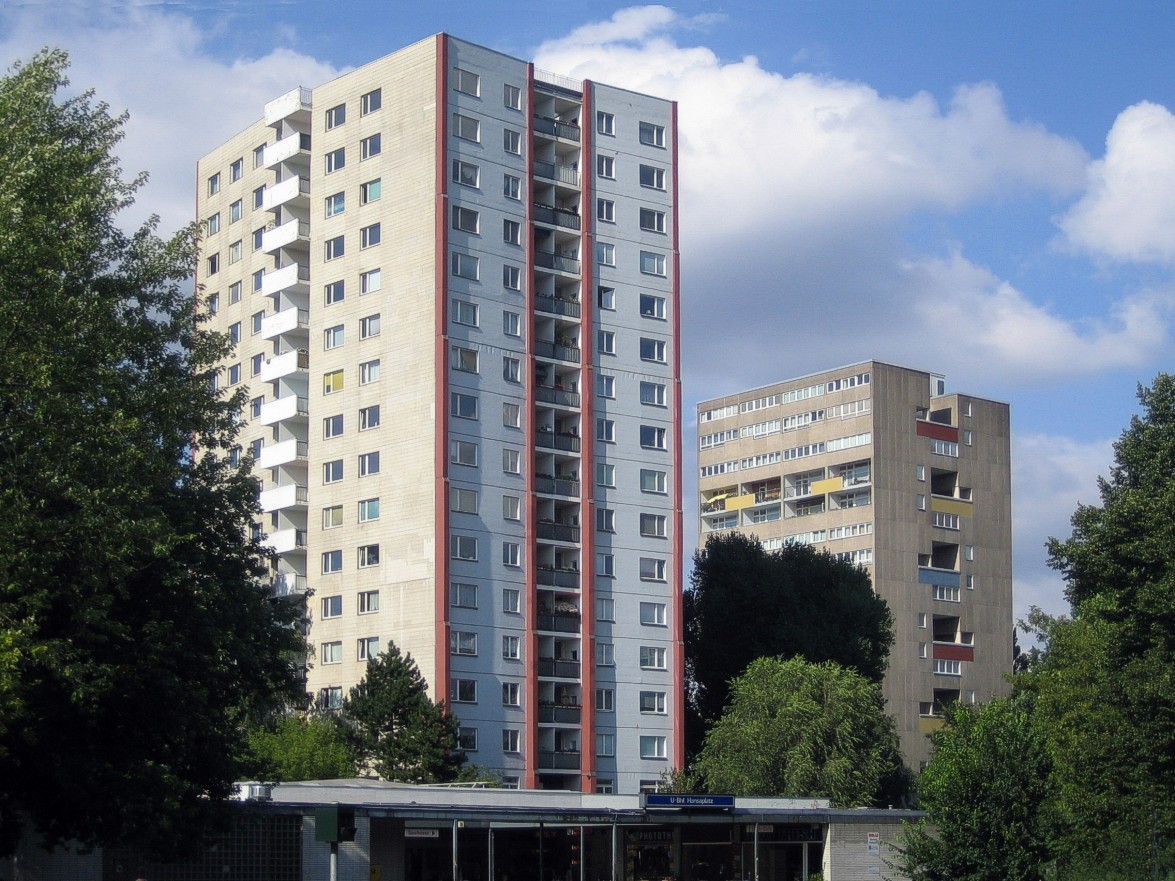
"Bakema Tower" housing in Berlin's Hansaviertel, designed in 1957 for Interbau and built 1959

From 1948 onward, van den Broek worked with Jacob Bakema. After Brinkman's death, the architectural firm was known as Van den Broek en Bakema (Van den Broek & Bakema). The practice played a leading role in Dutch post-war reconstruction rebuilding and expanding the housing in the Netherlands. The two architects collaborated to design landmarks and neighborhoods in Rotterdam and around the Netherlands.

Van den Broek and Bakema participated in the 1957 Interbau project in Berlin, a post-war building project in which 13 prominent international architects designed buildings for the Hansaviertel. Although their building, known as the Bakema Tower, was not constructed until two years after the exhibition of the project opened in July 1957, the plans and models were included in the catalogue. This was regarded as one of the firm's most significant projects.

They achieved international fame with some of their projects, including the Lijnbaan shopping centre (1949-53) and buildings for retailers Ter Meulen, Wassen and Van Vorst (1948-51) in Rotterdam.

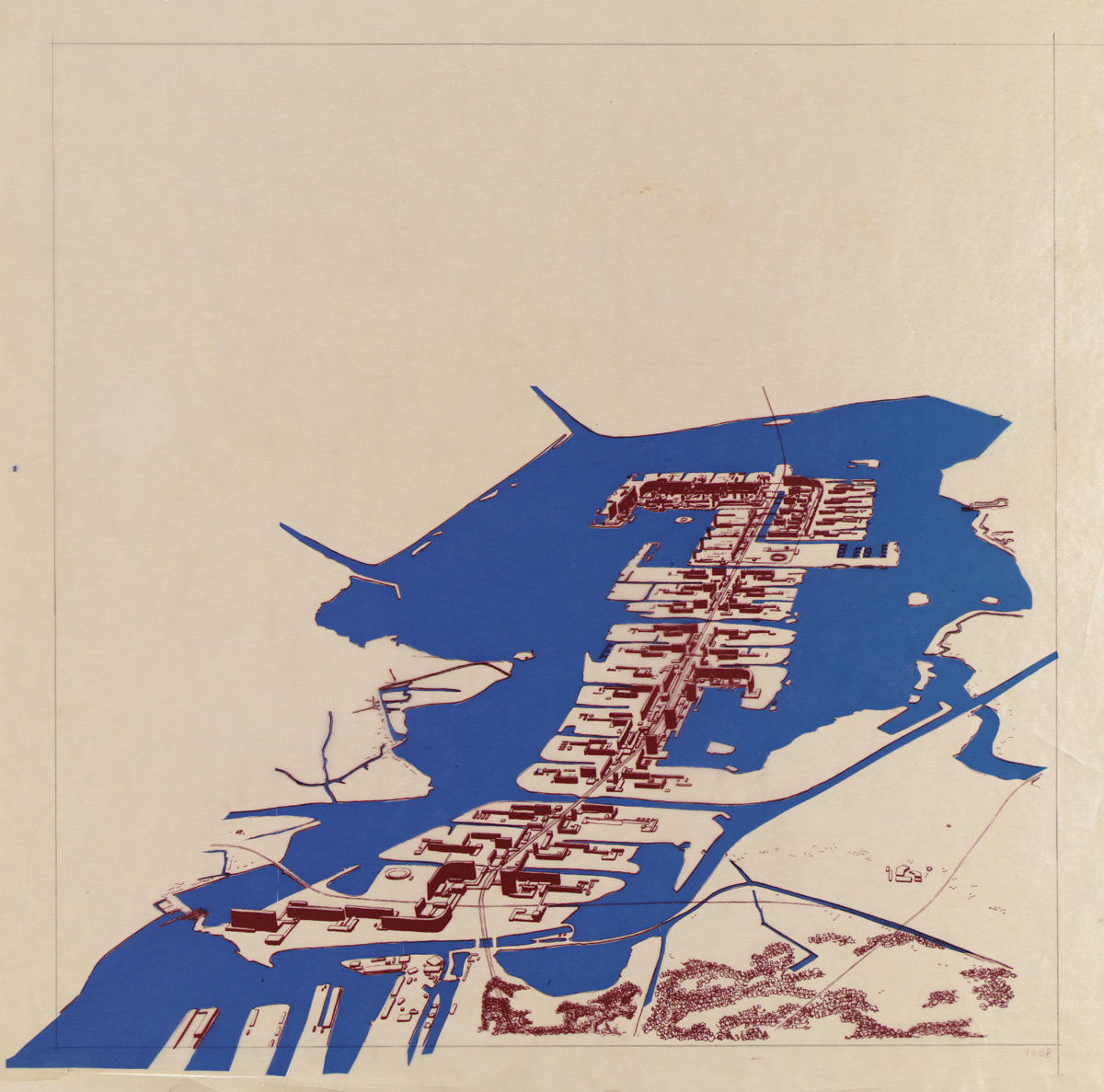
Pampus Expansion Plan (1965)

Van den Broek en Bakema was commissioned to design buildings for Delft University of Technology, including the Faculty of Architecture (1959-64) and the Auditorium (1959-66). Other major projects for which they are known are Marl civic centre in Germany (1958-62); Terneuzen town hall in Zeeland, Netherlands (1963-72); the Kennemerland regional plan (1957-59); and the plan for a city on the artificial island Pampus (1965).

The practice became known for its large-scale building projects and its problem-solving ability, and it generated new ideas about architecture, urbanism, and society. Bakema stayed on after Van den Broek left the practice in the early 1970s.

== Death and legacy ==
Van den Broek died on 6 September 1978 in The Hague, aged 79.

He was one of the founders of Nieuwe Bouwen, the modernist movement in Dutch architecture and construction after 1930.

The firm still exists to this day and is now known as Broekbakema.

== See also ==
- List of Dutch architects
