= Marie Wreschner =

German physicist and chemist (1887–1941)

- Born: 20 September 1887; Inowrazlaw, Kingdom of Prussia, German Empire
- Died: 17 November 1941 (aged 54); Berlin, Nazi Germany

Academic background
- Education: Friedrich Wilhelm University of Berlin (BA, PhD)
- Thesis: Über Drehungsumkehrung und anomale Rotationsdispersion (1918)
- Doctoral advisor: Arthur Wehnelt

Academic work
- Institutions: Agricultural University of Berlin; Kaiser Wilhelm Institute for Physical Chemistry and Electrochemistry

Marie Wreschner (20 September 1887 – 17 November 1941) was a German physicist and physical chemist. One of only two women at the Kaiser Wilhelm Institute for Physical Chemistry and Electrochemistry, she patented one of the earliest methods for treating cancer using radioactive materials in 1925.

In April 1933, Wreschner was dismissed from the institute under the antisemitic Law for the Restoration of the Professional Civil Service, which the Nazi Party used to exclude Jews from civil service. She continued to work as a private scientist, and in 1938 she applied to the British Society for the Protection of Science and Learning for help emigrating, but no position abroad was found for her.

She died by suicide on 17 November 1941, three days after the deportation of Jews in Berlin to the Minsk Ghetto, to avoid being deported. A street in Berlin's Marzahn-Hellersdorf district was named after her in 2015.

== Early life and education ==
Wreschner was born in Inowrazlaw (later renamed Hohensalza) in the Kingdom of Prussia in 1887 to Paula (née Borinski) and Abraham Jakob Wreschner, a banker. Her family was of Ashkenazi Jewish descent. A year after her birth, the family moved to Berlin, where Wreschner was raised.

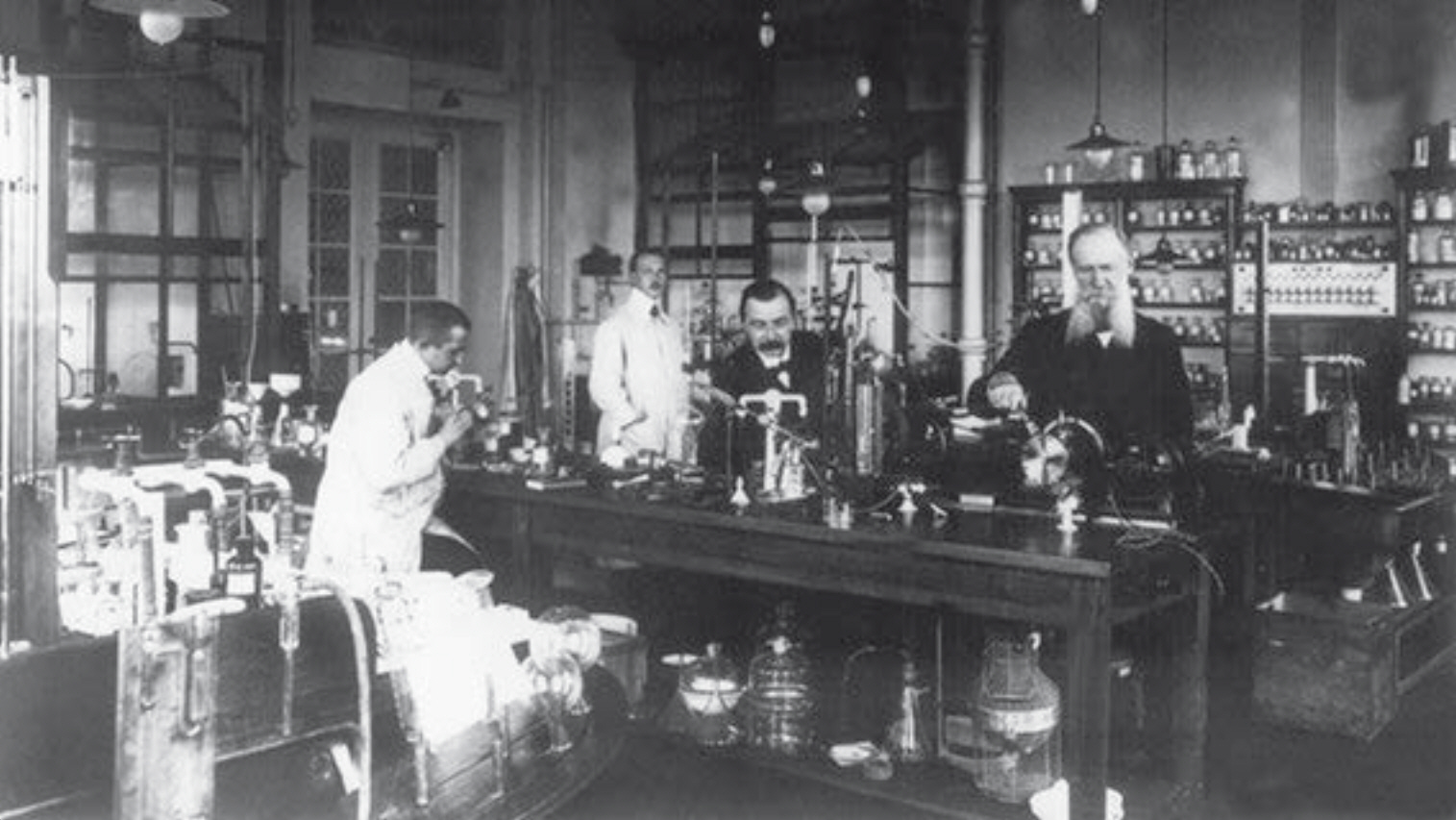
Beckmann's laboratory at the Kaiser Wilhelm Institute, where Wreschner later worked

She attended the Dorotheen lyceum in Berlin until 1904 and four years later began studying at the Strinz Gymnasium, established by Helene Lange to broaden educational access for German women. Bolstered by coursework at Strinz, she attained her Abitur certificate, a university entrance examination, from the Friedrich Wilhelm Gymnasium, a secondary school in Berlin.

Wreschner earned a degree in physics and chemistry from the Friedrich Wilhelm University of Berlin, where she took physics courses from Max Planck and chemistry courses from Ernst Otto Beckmann. She also studied at the Ludwig-Maximilians-Universität München, the University of Freiburg, and Heidelberg University between 1911 and 1917.

Wreschner earned her doctorate in physics under Arthur Wehnelt, inventor of the oxide cathode, at the University of Berlin in 1918. Her thesis dealt with rotational transition and rotary dispersion.

== Career ==
=== Cancer research ===
Wreschner (2nd row, 2nd from right) with other scientists at the Kaiser Wilhelm Institute for Physical Chemistry and Electrochemistry

After finishing her doctorate, Wreschner became an assistant to Leopold Spiegel at the Agricultural University of Berlin. She later moved to the Kaiser Wilhelm Society's Institute for Physical Chemistry and Electrochemistry, working under chemist Herbert Freundlich. Together, they published a paper on electrocapillarity in colored solutions in 1921. One of only two women at the institute, Wreschner also collaborated with physical chemists like Michael Polanyi and Fritz Haber.

In 1925, she and Laurence Loeb patented a method for treating cancer through the encapsulation of radioactive materials, a precursor to the invention of chemotherapy decades later. In their patent, granted by the U.S. Patent and Trademark Office on 1 April 1930, Wreschner described the adsorption of uranyl compounds suspended in ferric hydroxide capable of emitting beta particles as a possible method for treating carcinoma. Freundlich later wrote that her experiments saw the successful destruction of malignant tumors in animal tests, and that she had wished to continue to human trials before her dismissal.

Wreschner translated the textbook of influential chemist Sir Robert Robinson from English to German.

=== Dismissal and emigration attempts ===
In April 1933, soon after Adolf Hitler's rise to power, Wreschner was dismissed from her position at the institute under the Law for the Restoration of the Professional Civil Service. The majority of the institute's scientists were Jewish, and their dismissal led to a wave of recruitment and emigration to the United States and Britain. This included Haber, the director, as well as others such as James Franck and Rudolf Ladenburg. That year, Frederick G. Donnan arranged for Freundlich to come to University College London, and seeing the possibility that their research may have lucrative applications, allowed Freundlich to bring Karl Söllner, one of his assistants. No arrangement was made for Wreschner.

After her dismissal, Wreschner was financially supported by her mother, with whom she resided in Berlin. She continued to work as a private scientist, collaborating with the Swiss biochemist Emil Abderhalden. She researched the effects of radioactivity on living organisms and contributed to the development of measuring instruments. Her publications were banned in Germany in November 1938.

On 28 November 1938, just weeks after the events of Kristallnacht, she applied to the Society for the Protection of Science and Learning (SPSL), a British organization which oversaw the rescue of Jewish academics. Citing Freundlich, Abderhalden, and Bruno Lange as references, her translation of Robinson's textbook, and her medical work on radioactivity, she was nonetheless disadvantaged by a comparative shortage of scientific publications, having favored patent applications. Despite strong letters of recommendation from Freundlich and Donnan, the SPSL wrote that they had been in direct contact but, "until now have not been able to find anything for her" and suggested she apply to the International Federation of University Women instead.

In 1939, the Federation in turn noted that British laboratories were becoming full and that a "chief difficulty in Dr. Wreschner's case is her age", as they preferred younger scientists, and she was aged 51. The SPSL also suggested she apply for domestic work, something never asked of male applicants. Robinson recommended her to Cyril N. Hinshelwood, a physical chemist, who rejected her for being "really a physicist". Just one month before the start of World War II made emigration impossible, Dorothy Parsons of the Royal Cancer Hospital in London heard of her innovative work and sought to find a hospital position for Wreschner, whom she called "so fully qualified", but no arrangement was made in time.

=== Suicide ===
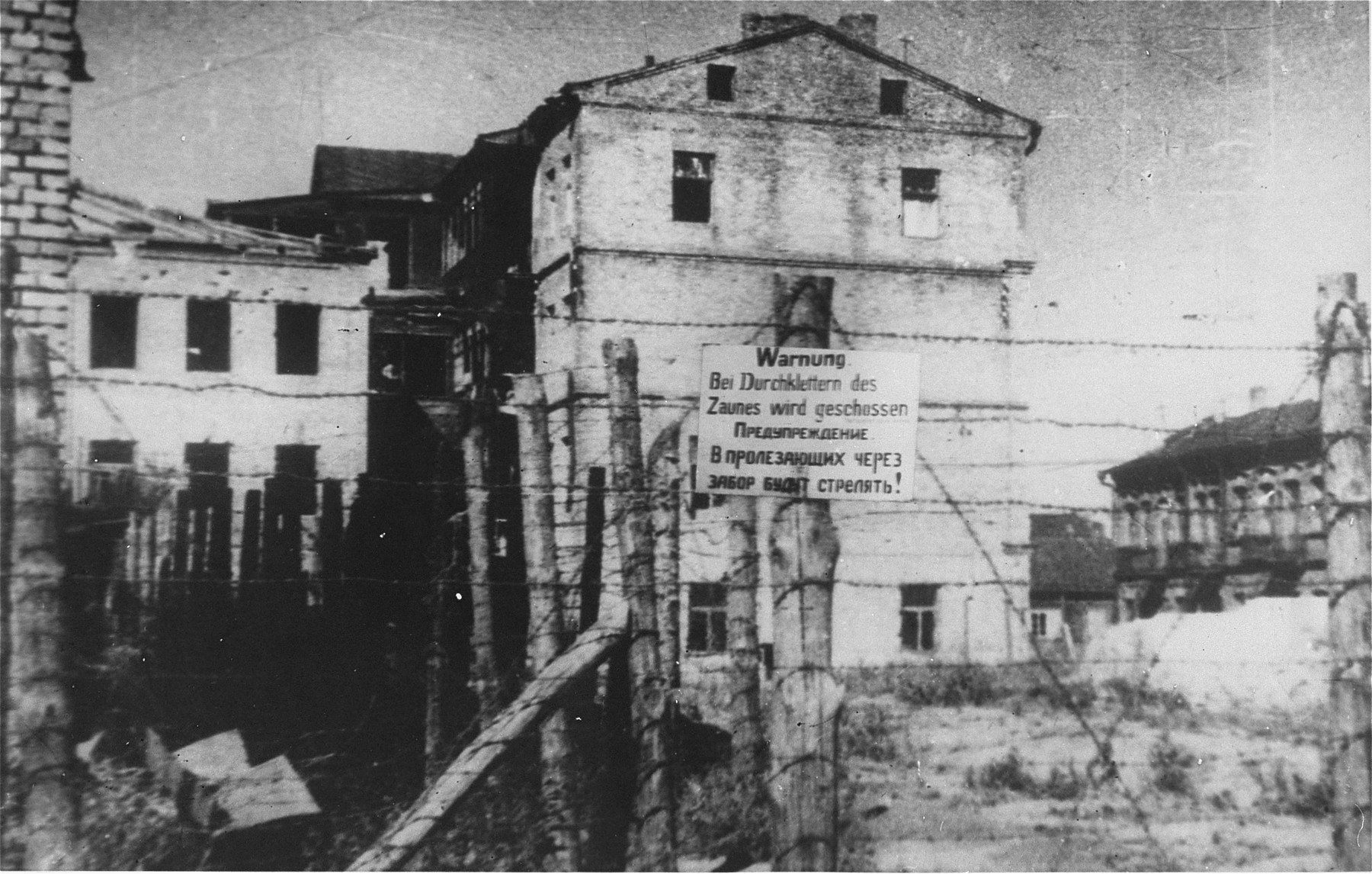
Wreschner chose suicide to deportation to the Minsk Ghetto, pictured in 1941

In 1940, she and her mother were robbed and forced to perform hard labor. Her mother died on 18 September 1940. While Hitler had been initially wary of deporting German Jews, fearing resistance from the German people, the invasion of Russia in the summer of 1941 changed his sense of purpose. On 7 November, the Jüdische Kultusvereinigung notified Jews in Berlin that they would be deported to a Jewish ghetto in German-occupied Minsk.

Wreschner died by suicide on 17 November 1941 to avoid deportation to a Nazi concentration camp, three days after Jews in Berlin were deported to the Minsk Ghetto. She died by inhaling a domestic supply of toxic coal gas from a kitchen stove. Her body was found in her apartment in the Hansaviertel quarter of Berlin the following day at 1:50 pm. She was 54 years old.

== Legacy ==
In 2015, a street in Berlin's Marzahn-Hellersdorf district was named after her. The street is located in CleanTechPark, a newly developed business park. Some of her manuscripts are kept in the Bodleian Library at Oxford.

== Works cited ==
- Clary, David C. (8 February 2024). The Lost Scientists of World War II. World Scientific. ISBN 978-1-80061-477-2.
- Rürup, Reinhard (2008). Schicksale und Karrieren: Gedenkbuch für die von den Nationalsozialisten aus der Kaiser-Wilhelm Gesellschaft vertriebenen Forscherinnen und Forscher [Fates and Careers: Memorial book for the researchers expelled from the Kaiser Wilhelm Society by the National Socialists] (in German). Wallstein Verlag. ISBN 978-3-89244-797-9.
