= Jaap Bakema =

Dutch modernist architect

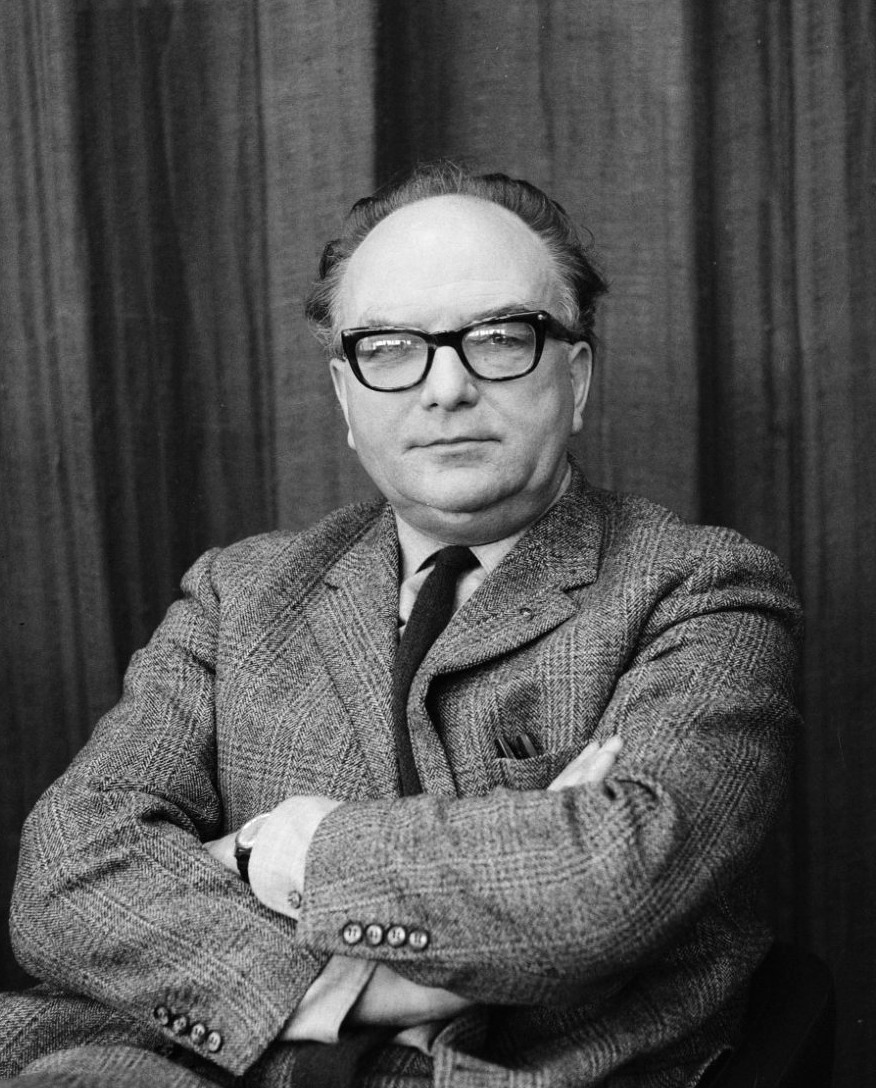
Jaap Bakema in 1966

Jacob Berend "Jaap" Bakema (8 March 1914 – 20 February 1981) was a Dutch modernist architect. He is notable for design of public housing and involvement in the reconstruction of Rotterdam after the Second World War, and especially his work with Jo van den Broek. The firm was renamed Van den Broek en Bakema in 1951. Bakema is also noted for his impact on the direction of modernist architecture.

== Early life and education ==
Jacob Berend "Jaap" Bakema was born on 8 March 1914 in Groningen, Netherlands.

He studied at the Groningen Higher Technical College (1931–1936).

After being inspired by the Rietveld Schröder House in Utrecht, he decided he wanted to be an architect. He enrolled at the Academy of Architecture in Amsterdam, where he studied under Mart Stam, and graduated with distinction in 1941.

== Career ==
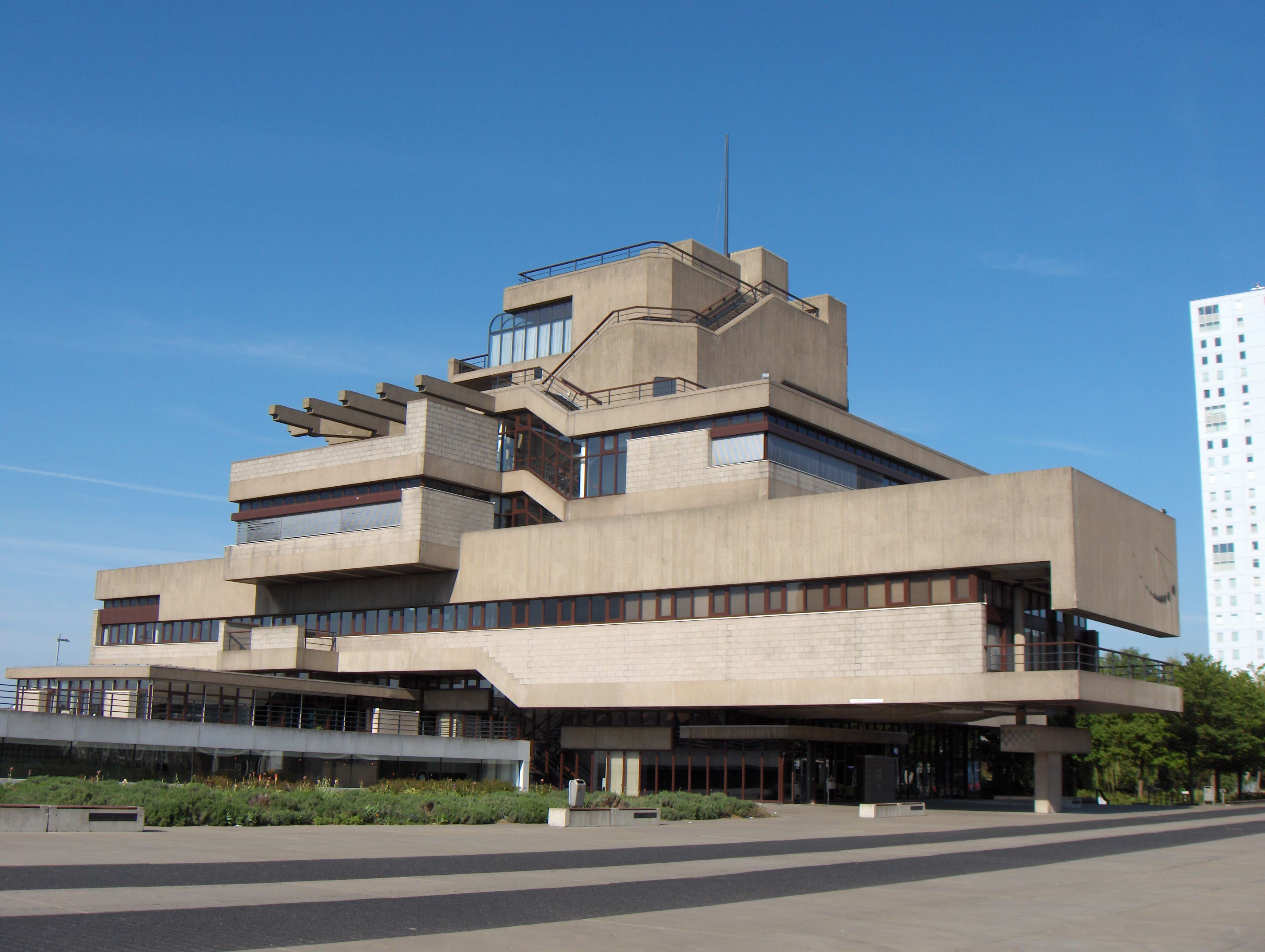
Terneuzen town hall

Bakema first worked at the Amsterdam Department of Public Works, in the urban development division. While the Second World War was still on, he moved to Rotterdam and joined the practice of Van Tijen and Maaskant.

After the war (which ended in 1945), he worked for the Rotterdam Public Housing Agency.

In 1948, Jo van den Broek invited him to join his firm in Rotterdam, Brinkman and Van den Broek Architects. Jan Brinkman died in 1949, and in 1951, the practice was renamed Van den Broek en Bakema (Van den Broek & Bakema). The practice played a leading role in Dutch post-war reconstruction rebuilding and expanding the housing in the Netherlands. The two architects collaborated to design landmarks and neighborhoods in Rotterdam and around the Netherlands.

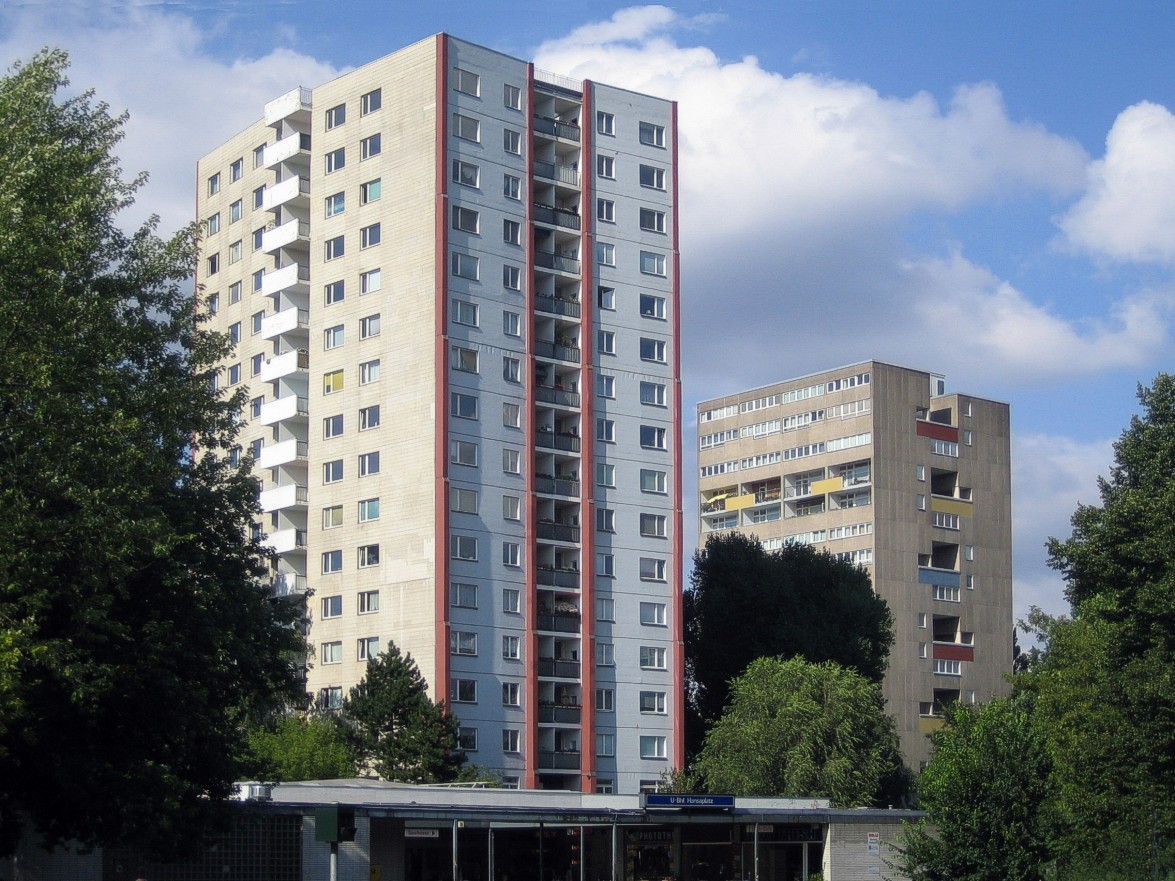
"Bakema Tower" housing in Berlin's Hansaviertel, designed for Interbau and built 1959

Van den Broek and Bakema participated in the 1957 Interbau project in Berlin, a post-war building project in which 13 prominent international architects designed buildings for the Hansaviertel. Although their building, known as the Bakema Tower, was not constructed until two years after the exhibition of the project opened in July 1957, the plans and models were included in the catalogue. This was regarded as one of the firm's most significant projects.

They achieved international fame with some of their projects, including the Lijnbaan shopping centre (1949-53) and buildings for retailers Ter Meulen, Wassen and Van Vorst (1948-51) in Rotterdam.

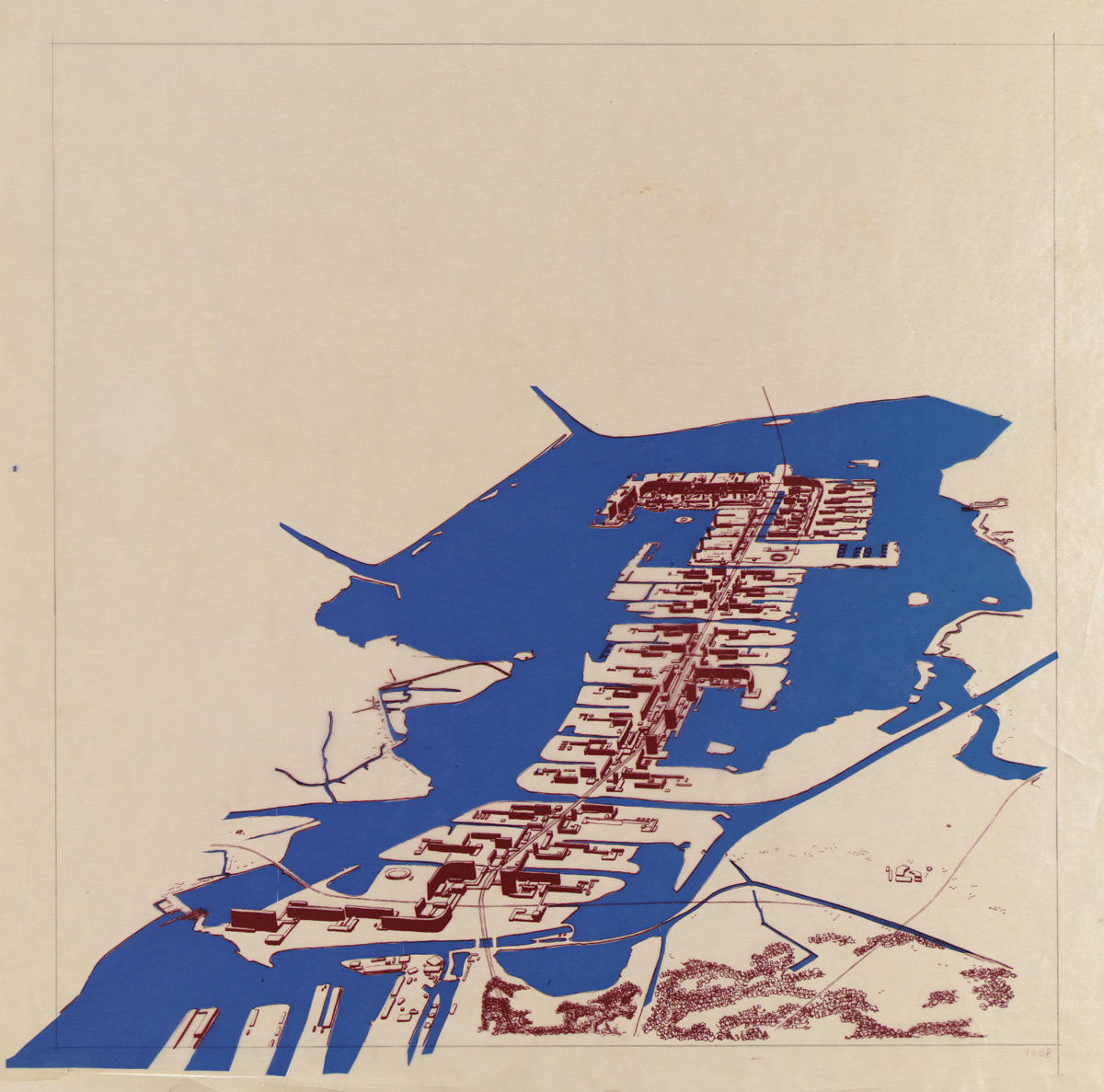
Pampus Expansion Plan (1965)

Van den Broek en Bakema was commissioned to design buildings for Delft University of Technology, including the Faculty of Architecture (1959-64) and the Auditorium (1959-66). Other major projects for which they are known are Marl civic centre in Germany (1958-62); Terneuzen town hall in Zeeland, Netherlands (1963-72); the Kennemerland regional plan (1957-59); and the plan for a city on the artificial island Pampus (1965).

Van den Broek en Bakema was commissioned to design buildings for Delft University of Technology, including the Faculty of Architecture (1959-64) and the Auditorium (1959-66). Other major projects for which they are known are Marl civic centre in Germany (1958-62); Terneuzen town hall in Zeeland, Netherlands (1963-72); the Kennemerland regional plan (1957-59); and the plan for a city on the artificial island Pampus (1965).

Bakema stayed on after Van den Broek left the practice in the early 1970s, working under the same name until his death in 1981.

== Other activities ==
In 1946 Bakema began attending meetings of the Congrès International d'Architecture Moderne, became its secretary in 1955, and was a core member of its offshoot Team 10.

After the war, first Van den Broek (1947) and then Bakema (1964) were appointed extraordinary professors at Delft University of Technology. In 1965 Bakema became a professor at Staatliche Hochschule in Hamburg. He was also a visiting professor at Columbia University in New York City and Cornell University in Ithaca.

== Personal life ==
Bakema was an outspoken character, and his personality has often been described in contrast to Van den Broek's, the later analytical, pragmatic, and likened to a schoolmaster, whereas Bakema was more of an idealist, philosopher, and priest.

== Death and legacy ==
Bakema died on 20 February 1981. Van den Broek en Bakema carried on, continuing to operate today as Architectenbureau Van den Broek en Bakema. As of 2025 the firm continues as Broekbakema.

Bakema left his mark on both architectural education and the atmosphere of the Department of Architecture at Delft, where he continued to teach until his death. The architectural practice of Van den Broek and Bakema was a significant player in the postwar reconstruction of the Netherlands, creating large housing projects and creating a new cityscape out of the bombed ruins. He is described by architectural historian Evelien van Es as "among the enthusiastic architects of the post-war period moving modernist architecture in a new direction".

Australian architect Col James, who had been influenced by reading about Team 10, spent some time working in Bakema's studio in the early 1960s.

In 2000, an exhibition called The Function of the Form – Van den Broek & Bakema Architecture and Urban Design was held at the Netherlands Architecture Institute in Rotterdam. The exhibition, which included original drawings and models, photographs, film footage, and audio tapes, was the largest survey of their work to date.

== Works ==
- Lijnbaan, Rotterdam (1949-54)
- Amstleven, Amsterdam (1961)
- Buikslotermeer, Amsterdam (1962)
- Marl Civic Center, Germany (1958-62)
- Terneuzen Town Hall, Netherlands (1968)
- Netherlands Pavilion, Expo '70, Osaka (1970)
- Psychiatric hospital, Middelharnis (1973-74)
