= Unité d'Habitation of Berlin =

1958 building in Berlin by Le Corbusier

Coordinates: 52°30′37″N 13°14′38″E

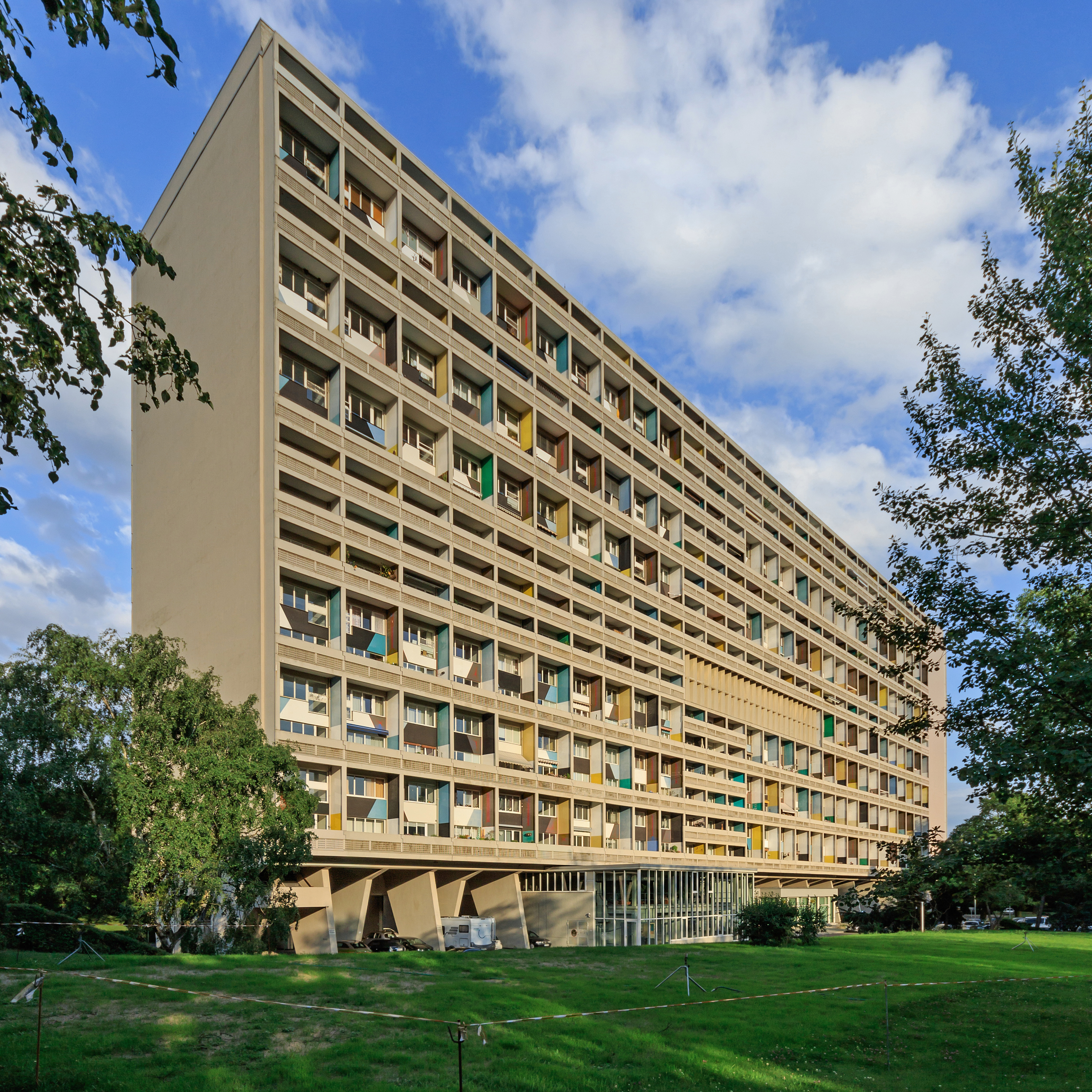
Unité d'Habitation of Berlin

Unité d'Habitation of Berlin (The name given by Le Corbusier is Unité d'habitation "Typ Berlin") is a 1958 apartment building located in Berlin-Westend (borough of Charlottenburg-Wilmersdorf), Germany, designed by Le Corbusier following his concept of Unité d'Habitation. Le Corbusier's Unité d'Habitation concept was materialised in four other buildings in France with a similar design. The building is constructed in béton brut (rough-cast concrete) and is part of the initial architecture style we know today as brutalism. The structure was built with on site prefab cast concrete panels and poured ceiling slabs. The Modulor system is the base measure of the Unité and Corbusier used not more than 15 Modulor measures to construct the entire structure form. The work was ultimately deleted from Le Corbusier's oeuvre, which he himself affirmed until his death in 1965, and which was again confirmed posthumously in 1967 with the final publication of his authorized oeuvre.

It is located southeast of the Olympiastadion S-Bahn station.

== History ==
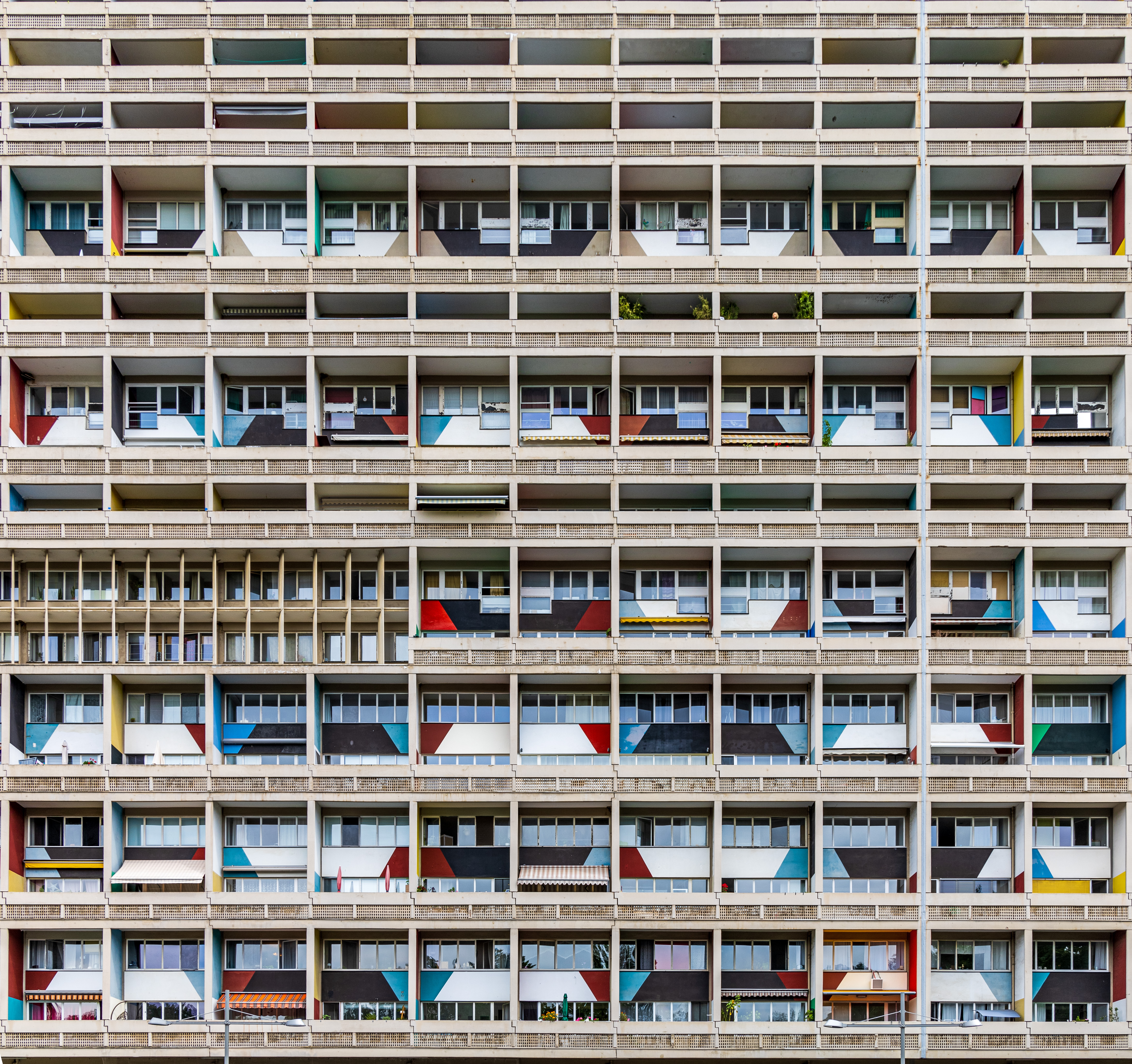
Detail of facade of Unité d'Habitation of Berlin

The original name of the building was Unité d'Habitation, type Berlin and is a variation of Le Corbusier's concept of a Radiant City or Housing Unit; it is now known as Corbusierhaus. It was part of the planning efforts for an international residential housing exhibition in Berlin in 1957, the (Interbau) 57 or IBA 57. Large number of the leading international architects of the modernist era were invited to design and build residential housing units in the Hansaviertel in West Berlin. Big architectural stars of the time came to Berlin and created themes modern versions of social housing. Walter Gropius, Oscar Niemeyer, Max Taut, Frei Otto, Alvar Aalto and many participated.

The post war isolation of West Berlin had made it difficult to rebuild the city and by the 1950s there was still a huge demand for housing and many parts of the city were still in ruins. At the same time the East German government, with support from the Soviet Union, had built a whole new housing section in East Berlin called the Karl-Marx-Allee. Bauhaus architects who had stayed in East Germany were leading these efforts, although the style of these buildings was Socialist realism or Neoclassicism and not modernist while the urbanism was modern.

In an effort to compete with the East German accomplishment, and also to supply affordable housing to West Berliners, the Senate of West Berlin together with the West German Government created the IBA. A special housing law, the LEX IBA, was created especially for the international architects. This law was more open to ideas that were not compliant with the local building code of the time. Le Corbusier had just completed his Unité in Marseille in 1952 and it was arguably the most famous social housing project in the world and it was especially him who was invited to participate in the IBA. Walter Gropius said about the Unité: "Any architect who does not find this building beautiful, had better lay down his pencil."

Corbusier's idea was to "provide with silence and solitude before the sun, space and greenery, a dwelling which will be the perfect receptacle for the family", and to "set up, in God's good nature, under the sky and in the sun, a magisterial work of architecture, the product of rigour, grandeur, nobility, happiness and elegance".

Another variation of the Unité had been almost finished in Nantes-Rez and it was clear that it was possible to create another copy in Berlin. However the building's mass was deemed too large for the city center of Berlin and another location further outside the city was considered. Corbusier had the choice between a few empty lots the city had to offer and he finally chose the site between the Olympic Stadium of the 1936 German Olympics and the very big mountain of rubble of the ruins of the demolished city buildings of WWII. The site is called „Heilsberger Dreieck", a triangle between Heilsberger Allee (today Flatowallee) and S-Bahn-Trasse. It is located closely to the Heerstrasse which connects in a straight line to the Brandenburg Gate and the Berliner Schloss.

Conception for the building started in 1956 and the original plans show a building very similar to the Unité at Nantes-Rez. The building site is a sandy ground and the pilots on the ground floor had to be doubled in order to create a stable structure. Most of the big ideas of the Unité in Marseille and Nantes were part of the plan in Berlin; an accessible roof terrace, a kindergarten, stores and businesses on the 5th floor, and a social service areas throughout the building.

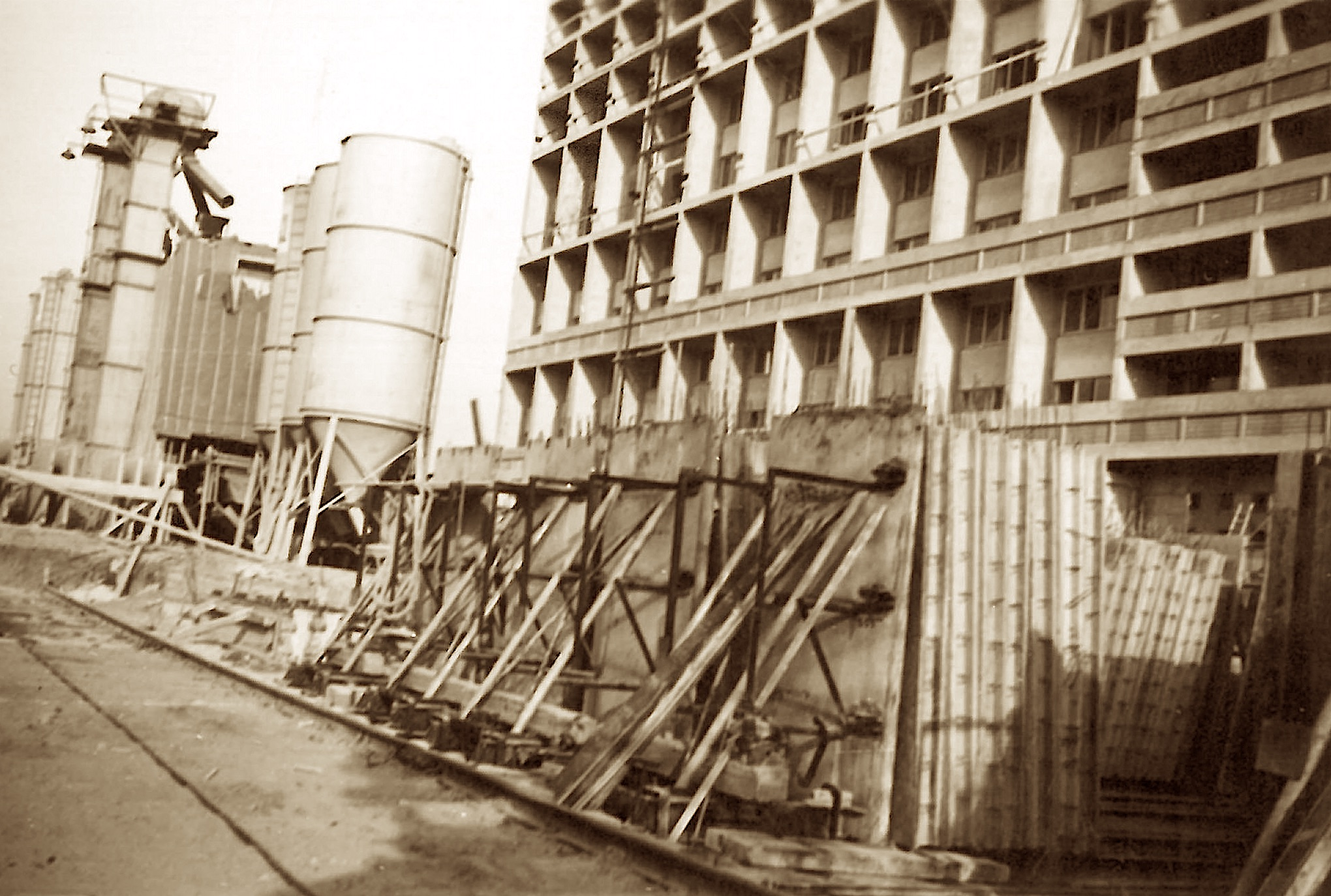
Construction site in 1957

However the authorities in Berlin and the developer cancelled most of these amenities. Corbusier fought very hard to keep the buildings elements in the planning but he eventually failed due to insufficient contracts. He had left the planning of the interior of the building to the Berlin authorities and he was only in charge of the design of the exterior structure of the building. However even the structure of the building was altered. A lengthy fight in the press and media of the time was fought about the ceiling height and other issues of the building. The result was that Corbusier's 226 cm height was changed to 250 cm. This change resulted in a modification of the entire building structure and of the apartments. In an attempt to recreate the golden section between apartment height of 266 cm and width of 399 cm, the width of the apartments was widened which made the entire building wider and higher.

The interior of the apartments and hallways are similar in plan to Corbusiers Unité in Marseille and Nantes but the open plan was not realized. The Berlin Building Department deemed it not legal to combine living areas such as kitchen and living room and definitely permitted can[?] open connection of living areas and bedrooms. The result was that the two level gallery was closed and each area was walled in and doors were installed throughout the apartment layout. The steel and wood staircase designs by Jean Prouvé and the kitchen designs by Charlotte Perriand were not realized in this building. Plans for the stair and kitchen did exist in 1956 but were then cancelled.

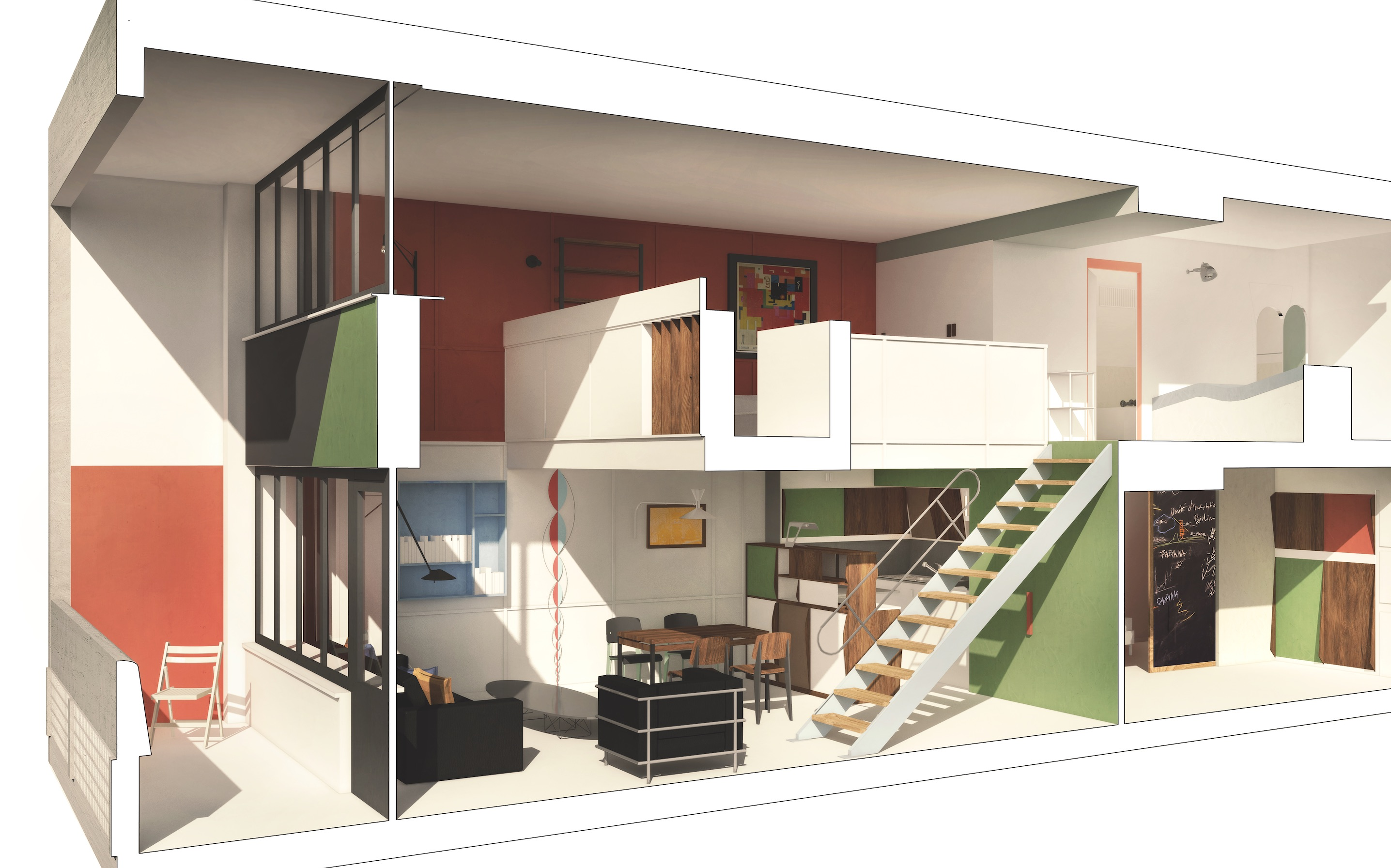
Reconstruction rendering

Another big change was that a majority of the split level units were cut in half and made into one bedroom units. Only on the two top floors were the Corbusier apartments built in full size. On 17 Floors there are 530 apartment units in total, compared to the 337 units in the original Marseille Unité of 1952. There are 173 one bedroom, 267 two bedroom, 85 three bedroom, 4 four bedroom units and one unit has five bedrooms. There are also a small number of offices and business in some of the units today. All units extend over two floors and they are reached through a wide center hallway or here called Street, Strasse or French Intérieures. This hallway does have the Corbusier modular height of 226 cm.

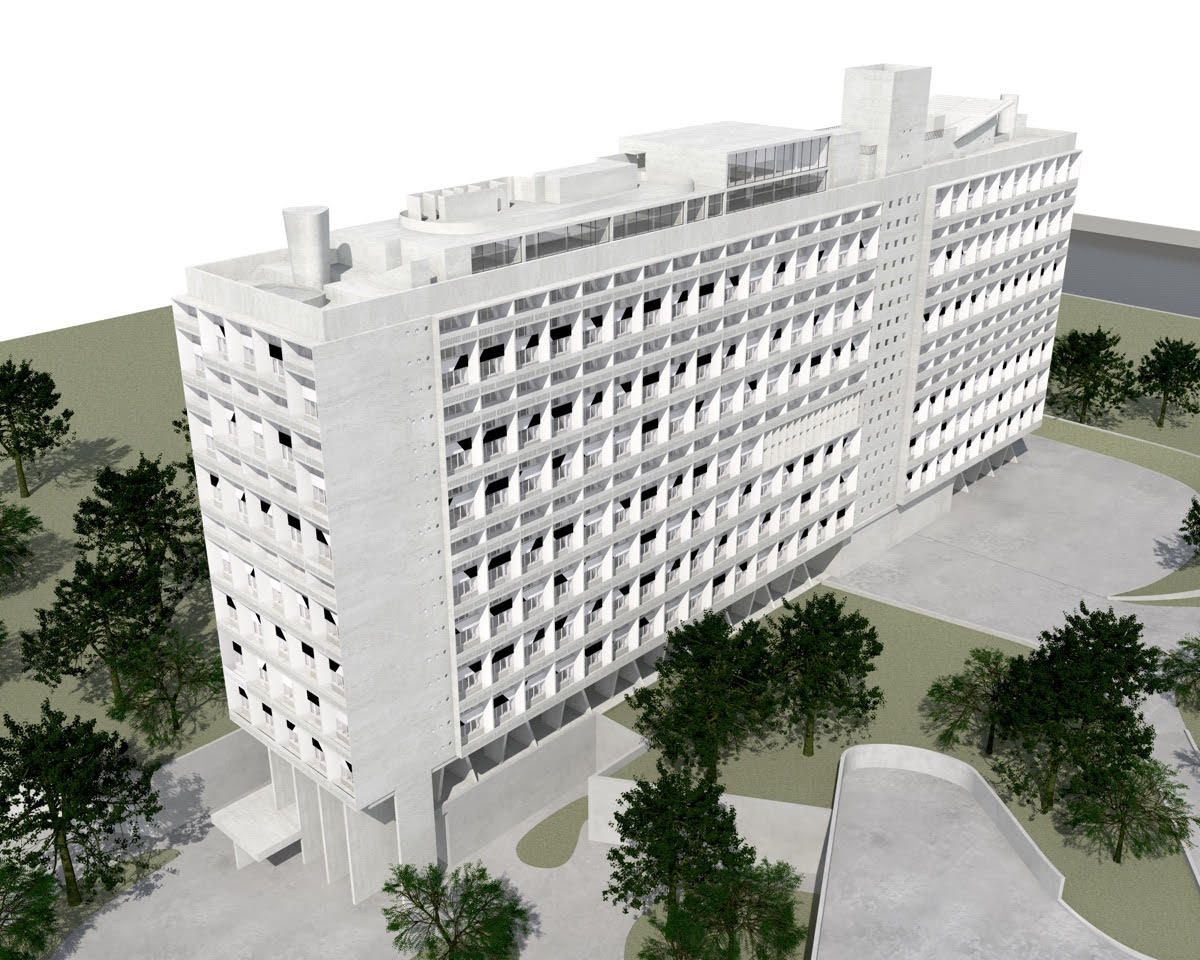
Reconstruction of Le Corbusier's original design from 1956 for Unité d'habitation "Typ Berlin".

André Wogenscky was the head of Corbusier's architecture office in Paris and he was in charge of oversight in Berlin. He had an office in the adjacent south hostel building which was part of the ensemble and which is today a Kindergarten. Several Architects in Berlin were the Berlin contact offices and translated the French plans into German and made all the aforementioned alterations. The Berlin Architect Jürgen Sawade interned in the planning offices and on the construction site and later lived in the building. A good quality of the building is the location amidst the Grunewald and on an elevated level. This is granting ample views and sunlight for all residents. According to Corbusier the view of the sky and nature is a vital part of modern architecture. Each unit has light and a late balcony and privacy. A small shop was installed in the lobby and is the only common service left in the building today.

The building was later called Corbusierhaus and has been protected by the Berlin Denkmalschutz since 1996. The Reichssportfeldstraße was renamed Flatowallee in 1997; today's address is Flatowallee 16.

The apartments were initially social housing units for rent and applications with proof of income had to be filed in order to get a contract. In the 1979 the building was privatized and the units were for sale. Renters had the right of first refusal. Many parts of the building had to be renovated and various areas had not been finished by the original developers. Over the years the condominium board invested in renovations and projects such as building a parking lot and an entrance lobby. The original power station was removed, a laundry room on the top floor was removed and turned into storage.

In recent years the south facade has been entirely renovated and the west facade is currently on the way of reconstruction. The colors of the exterior were designed by Corbusier together with the painter Fernand Léger. The base of the color scheme is Corbusier's own collection of pigment and chemical colors, called the color keyboard of polychromy of 1931. In 1959 he created a new version of the keyboard. The only known source of the individual color design for the Berlin Unité facade is a painted wood model which is today archived at the Berlinische Gallery. Original plan drawings of the building can today be found in the archive of the Corbusierhaus, the Berlin building apartment and the Foundation Le Corbusier, Paris. Corbusierhaus plans from the Foundation are also available among 400,000 other documents on DVDs through the publisher Echelle-1.

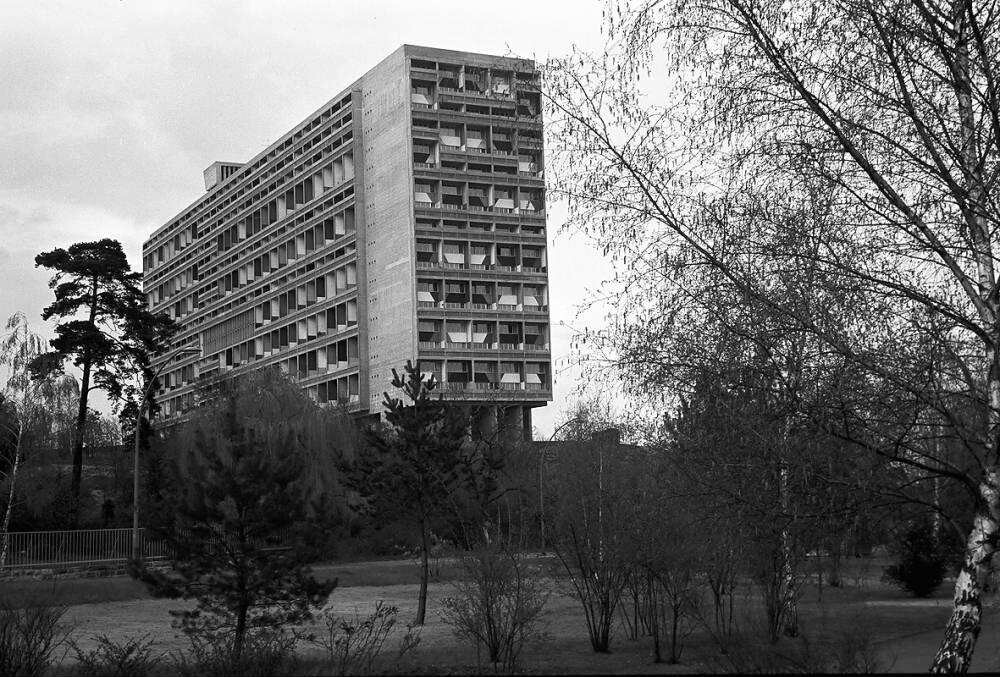
A newly opened building, where the original pavilion on the roof was later destroyed.

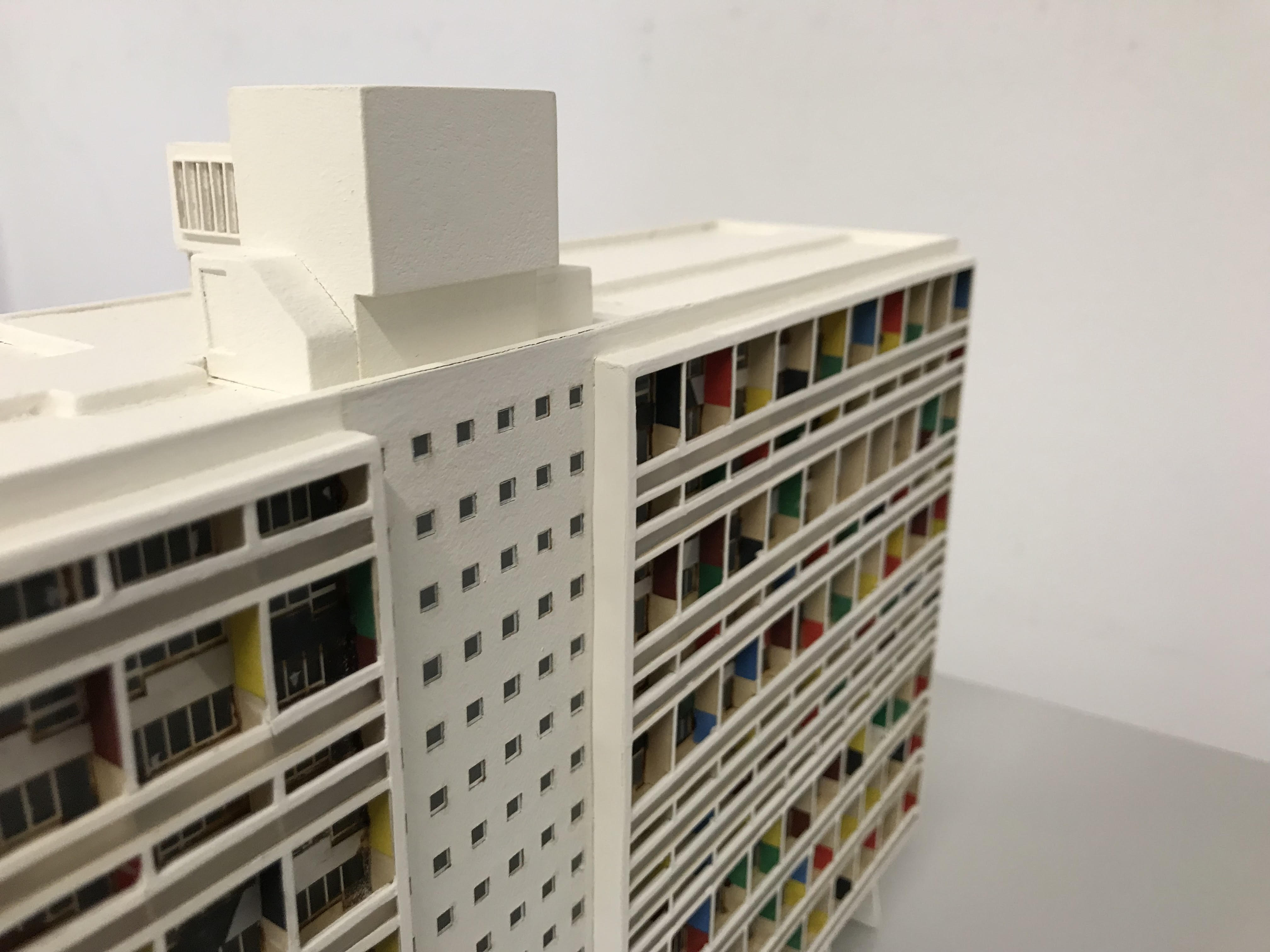
Le Corbusier's 1958 model for Unité d'habitation "Typ Berlin", Berlinische Galerie

The original glazed concrete pavilion on the roof had one sloping wall to create a unique contrast effect with the entire building, but this pavilion was removed after many years. The original windows of the pavilion were also removed.

Recent renovations of the apartments have been made by individual owners, designers and architects.

Le Corbusier's utopian city living design was repeated in four more buildings with this name and a very similar design:

- 8 unbuilt Unité d'habitation buildings in St. Dié, France,
- Unité d'habitation of Marseille in 1952,
- Unité d'Habitation of Nantes-Rezé in 1955,
- Unité d'Habitation of Briey in 1963,
- Unité d'Habitation of Firminy-Vert in 1965.

== See also ==
- Plattenbau
- Tower block
- University Apartments (Chicago, Illinois)
