= Interbau =

German housing development

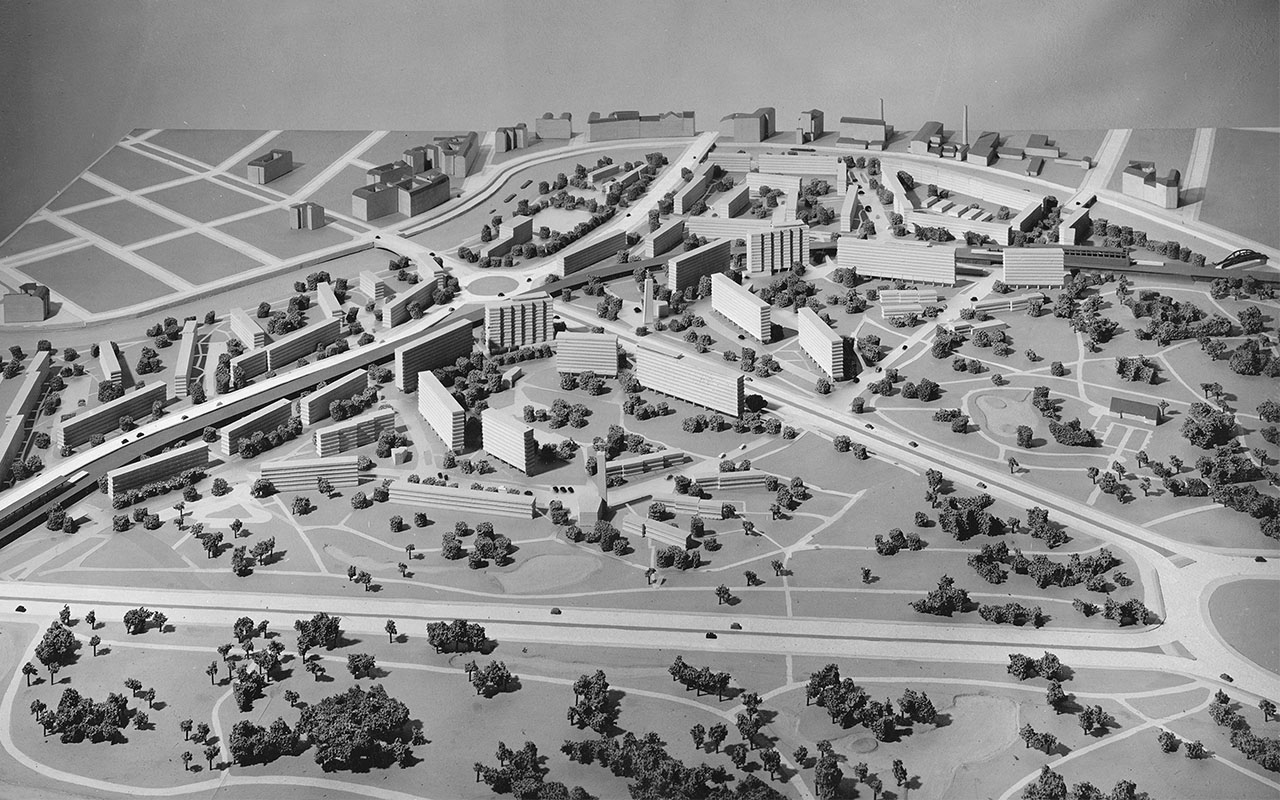
Aerial view of Interbau

The International Building Exhibition (Interbau) was an architectural project in which a number of prominent international architects designed buildings for the reconstruction of the Hansa quarter of Berlin after World War II. After the buildings were constructed, the exhibit was officially opened in July 1957. Many of the buildings still stand today, including those designed by Le Corbusier, Oscar Niemeyer, Arne Jacobsen, Alvar Aalto, and Walter Gropius. Situated in a park, Interbau showcased an array of designs by the foremost Western architects from many countries, with high and low-rise buildings merging seamlessly with the landscape and greenery.

== Background ==
Towards the end of the Second World War, Berlin was heavily bombed by the Allies. A significant portion of the city was razed. Sandwiched between the Tiergarten and the River Spree, the Hansa neighbourhood was no exception.

After the defeat of Nazi Germany, the US, France, and Great Britain controlled the Western sectors of Berlin, while the East was under the grip of the Soviets. Both East and West Berlin suffered from housing shortages. For a brief period, the two sectors attempted to work together and rebuild. However global power politics dominated, and the city was divided. Both East and West Berlin saw Berlin's reconstruction as a way to demonstrate the superiority of their values and way of life. A new law, LEX IBA, was enacted to allow for planning and design without the previous building codes. In East Berlin, Stalinallee was created; in the West, Interbau.

Stalinallee was inspired by Socialist realism and classicism. Because the buildings were structured in three tiers, they were often compared to wedding cakes. While the facades of the buildings on Stallinalle were uniform, the Soviets emphasised luxurious finishes within the buildings, including stucco ceilings, parquet floors, double glazing on fixtures, and central heating.

The focus of Interbau was on modern residential building. In the words of Rolf Schwedler, the Senator for Building and Housing, "In this regard, the demands and requirements of the modern man are to be taken into full consideration." Unlike Stalinallee, the buildings of Interbau utilised a wide array of colours. While apartments within the builds had similar appointments, the outer structures were unique.

Interbau was intended to be a testament to Western values of freedom of expression, where high and low-rise buildings merged seamlessly with the landscape and greenery. Thirteen architects participated in the project.

The exhibit opened on 6 July 1957, in West Berlin's Hansa neighbourhood.

== Architects ==
More than 50 architects, from around the world (excluding Soviet-occupied territories in Eastern Europe), were involved. By including architects from so many countries, West Berlin communicated that Interbau was not only German, it was multicultural, drawing inspiration from around the world. Some of the more notable architects who worked on Interbau include Le Corbusier (France), Oscar Niemeyer (Brazil), Arne Jacobsen (Denmark), Alvar Aalto (Finland), and Walter Gropius (German-American).

The buildings were situated in a park, and in addition to the architecture, careful attention was given to landscaping. Led by Walter Rossow, Interbau could live up to its vision of "people in a green metropolis" only by careful, integrated landscape design. In 1955, just two years before the opening of the exhibit, Rossow's article "Green Spaces in the Hansaviertel" laid out the plan for landscaping Intebau. In 1956 work began on Interbau's green spaces.

== Major contributions ==
Among the 601 apartment complexes and additional amenities, five buildings stand out. These buildings include the Oscar Niemeyer-Haus, Walter Gropius-Haus, Alvar Aalto-Haus, Corbusierhaus, and Congress Hall.

The Walter Gropius House was designed by Walter Gropius and Wils Ebert. The structure features pops of bright colours on the balconies and entrances. The balconies line the building in a checkered fashion. The house itself is a concave structure with narrow sides. Like many other buildings in Interbau, the Gropius and Ebert design sought to ensure no visible line between the residential area and the park.

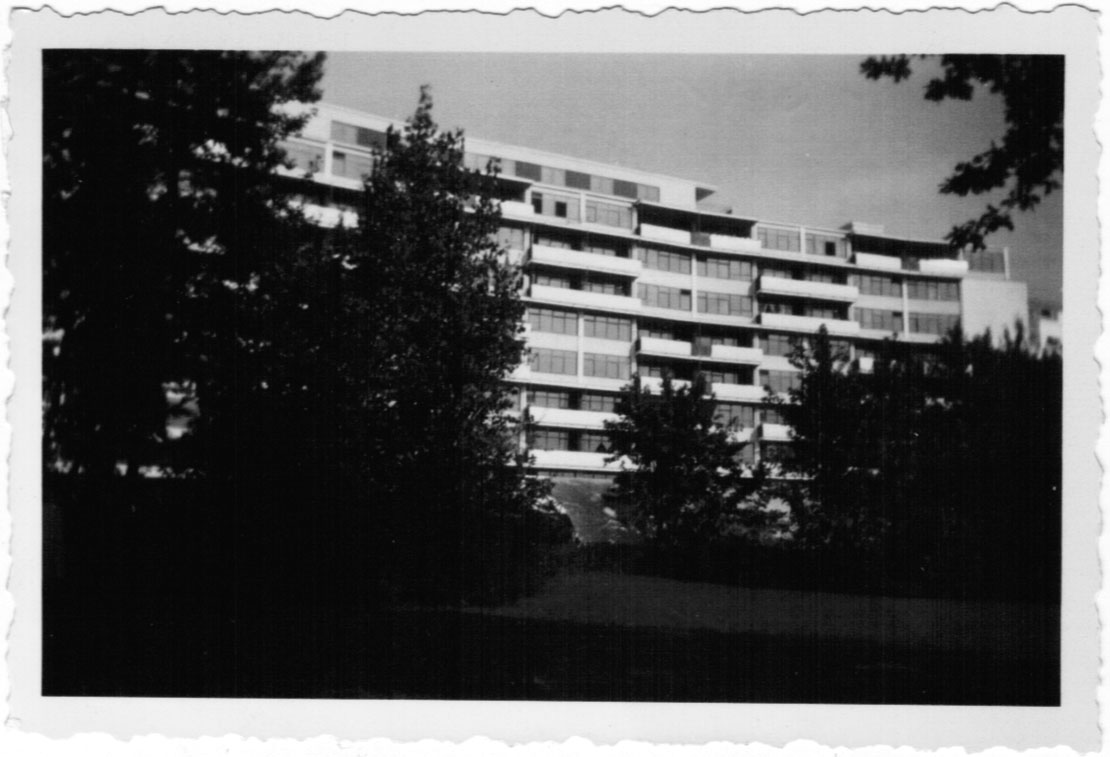
Walter Gropius House

Corbusierhaus was intended to be a remodel of the Unité d'habitation in Milan. The building was intended to be a "city in a city". Its size, however, caused some commotion. In contrast to other buildings, Courbusierhaus included 530 apartments and 17 stories.

Designed by a prominent Brazilian architect, Oscar Niemeyer Haus features 78 apartments with distinct blue and yellow balconies. The building is supported by v-shaped concrete pillars. Like many other buildings in Interbau, the apartment complex is lined with windows, allowing nature into people's homes.

Alvar Aalto-Haus, designed by leading Finnish architect Alvar Aalto, was eight stories high and contained 78 apartments. To bring nature into the home, each apartment featured a large patio. Windows were included on all sides of the building. Additionally, the building bends towards the west and opens towards the east allowing all apartments to capture natural light.

Congress Hall, also known as the House of World Cultures, was designed by American architect Hugh Stubbins as a gift from the United States. The building was constructed on an artificial mound so that it could be seen from East Berlin. After the exhibition ended, Congress Hall was gifted to the city of Berlin. The building acted as a center for discussion of international contemporary arts, focusing on non-European cultures and societies. However on 21 May 1980, the structure collapsed. The building has since been reconstructed in its original style.

== Other buildings ==
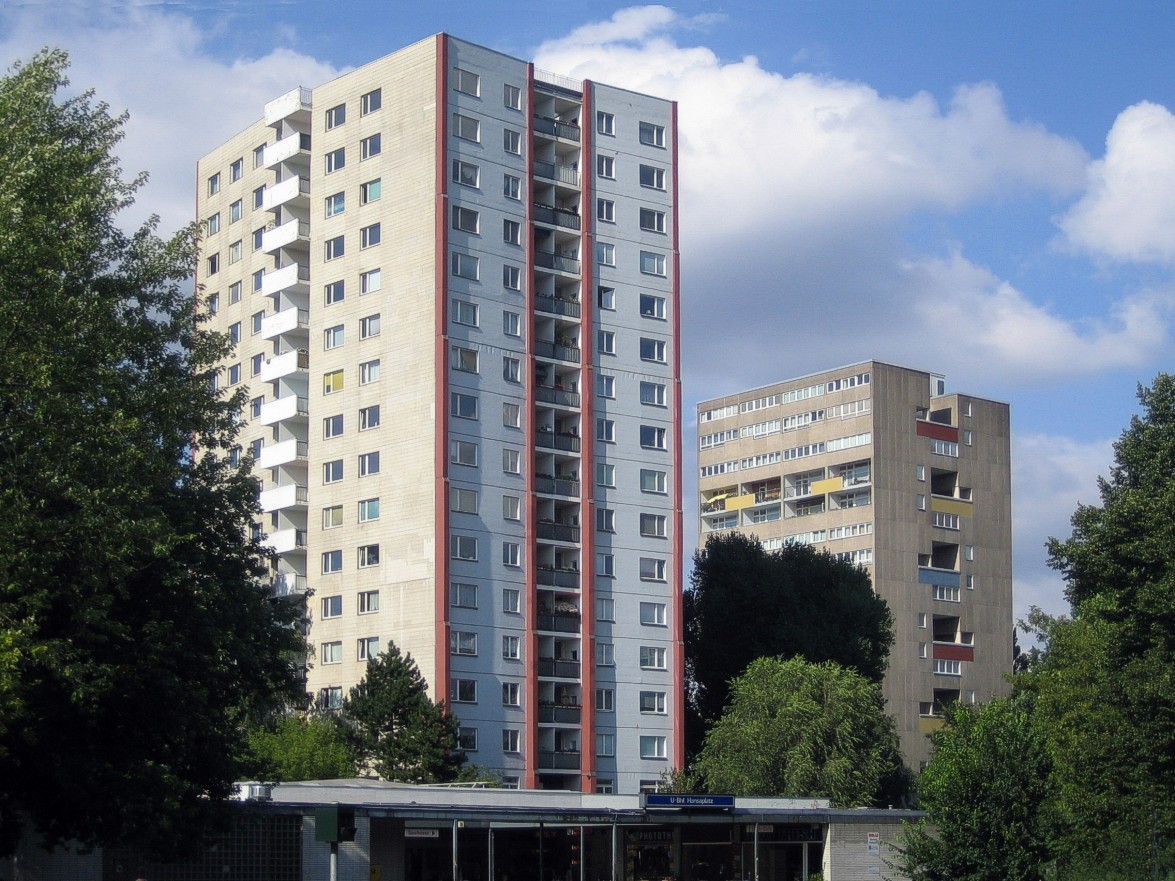
"Bakema Tower", designed for Interbau and built 1959

The Dutch architectural firm Van den Broek & Bakema, comprising Jo van den Broek and Jaap Bakema, participated in the project. Although their building, known as the Bakema Tower, was not constructed until two years after the exhibition opened, the plans and models were included in the catalogue.

== Today ==
Interbau no longer has the mission of promoting Western values of freedom. The exhibit is an important example of modernism, a successful integration of nature into the living space. While some of the individual buildings have been recognised, the community as a whole and the successful collaboration of notable architects have not been given the same prominent recognition. Although residential, the area is available for tourism and study.

== See also ==
- International Building Exhibition Berlin, also known as IBA Berlin 1983/87
