= Lijnbaan =

Shopping street in Rotterdam, the Netherlands

Coordinates: 51.920°N 4.477°E

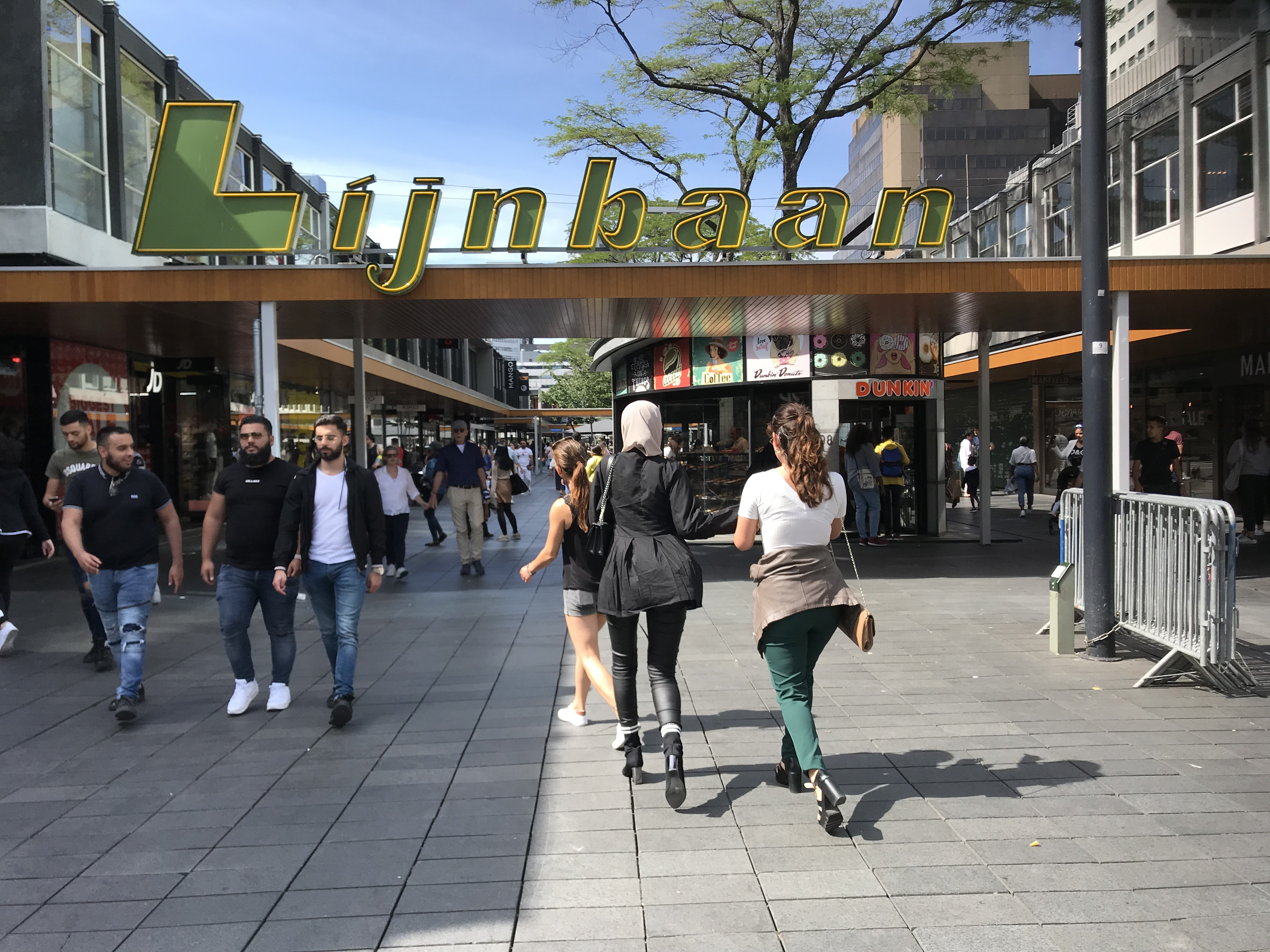
The Lijnbaan in 2019

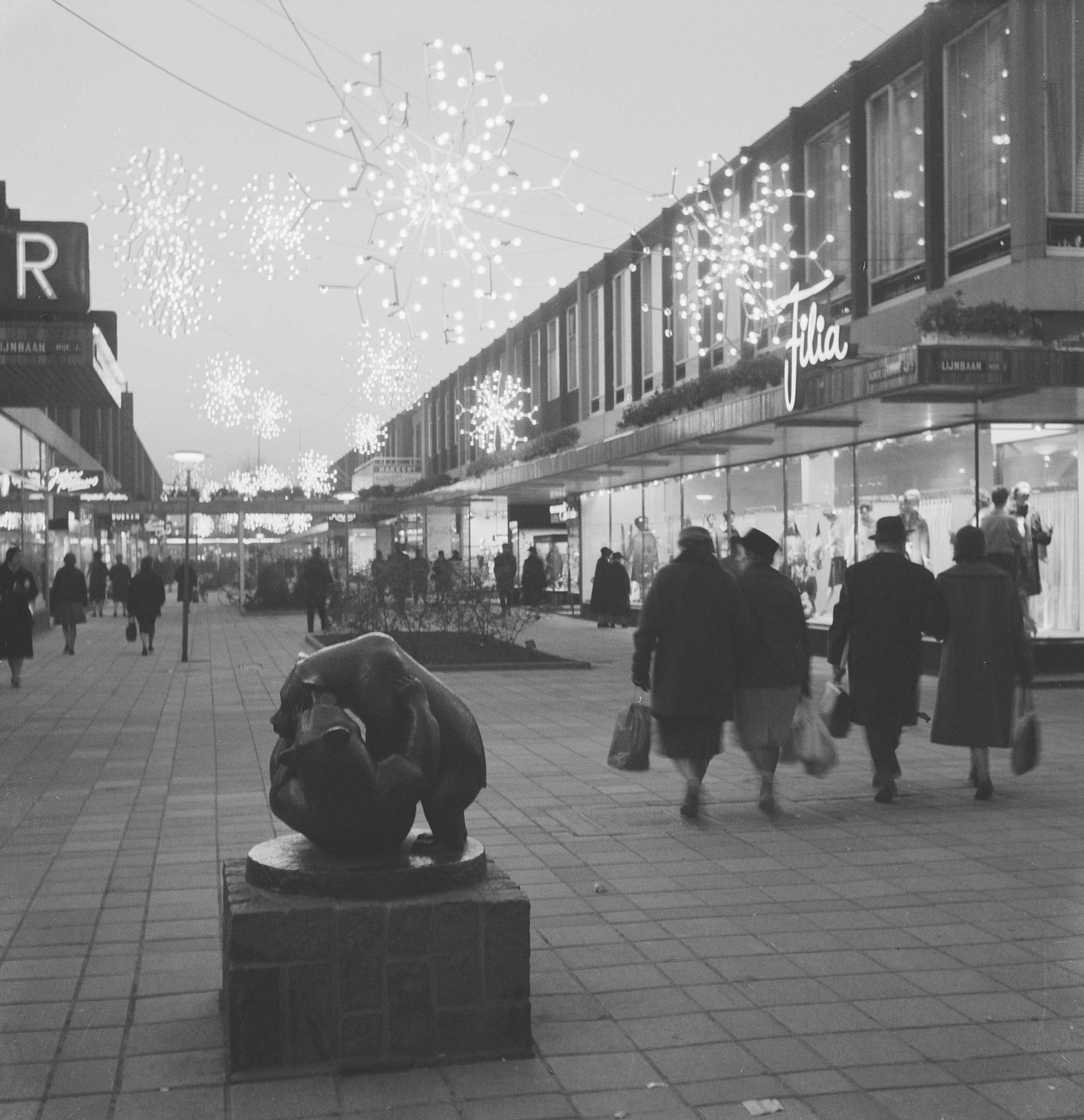
The Lijnbaan in 1961

The Lijnbaan is a pedestrian shopping street in the centre of Rotterdam, Netherlands. It was designed by Jo van den Broek and Jaap Bakema as part of the rebuilding of the city after the German bombing of 1940, and opened on 9 October 1953. It has been described as the first purpose-built pedestrian street in Europe. The original section has been a rijksmonument (national monument) since 2010.

== History ==
=== Planning ===
The bombing of May 1940 destroyed Rotterdam's old shopping district. The first reconstruction plans placed a new shopping area to the west of the old centre, but laid it out in the conventional way, with blocks along ordinary streets, shops at ground level and housing above. It was intended for shopkeepers who had traded on the Noordblaak before the war and wanted to be grouped together again.

It is not known whether the final scheme came from the city's planning office or from Van den Broek's firm. Van den Broek had included a version of the idea in a 1946 brochure on building in the city centre. The design separated the functions that had shared the pre-war streets. Shops lined a car-free promenade and were supplied from service streets behind them, while housing went into separate apartment blocks. The 66 shopkeepers taking part were sceptical at first, but a model at 1:100 scale won them over. They also objected to the name, which refers to the ropewalks once located in the area, and would have preferred to call the street the Promenade.

=== Construction and opening ===
The first phase was built between 1949 and 1953. The first of some 750 foundation piles was driven in July 1952. The street opened on 9 October 1953 to such crowds that police let visitors in ten at a time.

=== Early years ===
Despite the shopkeepers' fears, the car-free street succeeded. Upmarket shops did well, and it drew visitors from across the Netherlands. The American critic Lewis Mumford praised it in The New Yorker in 1957. A marketing slogan of the time asked shoppers whether they had "Lijnbaaned" yet.

By the 1960s every new Dutch suburb had a traffic-free shopping centre of its own, so the idea soon lost its novelty. The street has also been cited as a model for pedestrian shopping areas abroad, such as the town centre of Stevenage.

In the late 1950s the Lijnbaan was the scene of trouble with youth gangs, which inspired John den Admirant's 1960 novel Lijnbaan-Djungel. In 1968 the Rotterdam cabaret singer Dorus recorded a song in praise of the street to the tune of "Delilah".

=== Extension ===
Between 1967 and 1970 the street was extended to the department stores on the Binnenwegplein, after the demolition of what remained of the Coolsingel Hospital. The extension added a second square, the Lijnbaanplein, with larger shops around it. At the Binnenwegplein a bridge building linking the Ter Meulen department store)and De Klerk department stores housed the Lijnbaan Centre, an exhibition space, which closed in 1984. A cinema in its basement later became the jazz club Thelonious, which closed in 1992. The Coolsingelpoort, a gateway from the old hospital, still stands at the end of the street.

=== Decline and protection ===
High rents gradually drove out many of the original shops, which were replaced by discount stores and fast food outlets. Indoor shopping centres such as Zuidplein and Oosterhof drew customers away. By the 1980s the street had become a place to avoid at night, its shop windows behind roller shutters.

Plans to roof the street over were drawn up in 1987 by OMA with Ove Arup & Partners, and in 1988 by Derek Walker and the Conran Design Group. The shopkeepers lost interest once they learned the cost, although roofs, paving and facades were renovated.

In 2005 there were plans to demolish much of the Lijnbaan and the neighbouring apartment blocks. They were dropped when the culture minister, Ronald Plasterk, designated the complex a national monument on 19 February 2010. According to the city, the protection covers only the first phase. One block of shops has since been restored by Mei Architects, and the "Lijnbaan" lettering on the roof has been put back. Since the 2010s the street has had something of a revival as a meeting place for younger shoppers.

== Layout and design ==
The first phase consists of the long Lijnbaan, running from the Weena to the Van Oldenbarneveltstraat, crossed by the shorter Korte Lijnbaan between the Schouwburgplein and the Coolsingel. The 1960s extension continues south to the Binnenwegplein. The street is 12 to 18 metres wide. The pre-war Hoogstraat, by comparison, was 9 metres wide with a traffic lane down the middle.

With no housing above the shops, the buildings are low. Canopies project from the shopfronts and cross the street at junctions, but were left off one side of the Korte Lijnbaan to keep the view of the city hall open. The shops were planned on a grid of 1.1 by 1 metres, with prefabricated concrete facades and large windows at street level. Two basic types were used, one with two sales floors and one with split levels at the rear. The street was furnished with flower beds, benches, sculptures, free-standing display cases and, at first, aviaries.

Not everything along the street is by Van den Broek and Bakema. The Stadhuisplein, where the street meets the city hall square, is formally not part of the Lijnbaan, and its buildings are by other architects. C. Elffers designed Ruteck's restaurant at the main crossing, and the last stretch towards the Weena is flanked on its east side by the Thalia cinema complex designed by Hendriks.

== Notable buildings ==
- Rotterdam City Hall (Coolsingel 40). Built 1914–1920 and one of the few buildings in the centre to survive the bombing, it stands at the eastern end of the Korte Lijnbaan.
- De Bijenkorf department store (Coolsingel 105). Designed by Marcel Breuer with Abraham Elzas and opened in 1957, it is a rijksmonument.
- Lijnbaan apartment blocks, the high-rise housing built behind the shops as part of the original scheme.
- Ter Meulen building, now De Karel Doorman (Binnenwegplein). The department store by architects Van den Broek en Bakema opened in 1951; a residential tower was added on top in 2012.
- Former H.H. de Klerk furniture store (Binnenwegplein), also by Van den Broek en Bakema, 1956.
- Thalia cinema complex, on the east side of the northern end of the street.
- Playing Bears (1956), a sculpture by the Norwegian artist Anne Grimdalen, given by the Norwegian ambassador.
