= Wehnelt cylinder =

Electrode in the electron gun assembly of some thermionic devices

A cross-section view, showing how a Wehnelt localizes emissions at the filament tip and serves as a convergent electrostatic lens

A Wehnelt cylinder (also known as Wehnelt cap, grid cap or simply Wehnelt) is an electrode in the electron gun assembly of some thermionic devices, used for focusing and control of the electron beam. It is named after Arthur Rudolph Berthold Wehnelt, a German physicist, who invented it during the years 1902 and 1903. Wehnelt cylinders are found in the electron guns of cathode ray tubes and electron microscopes, and in other applications where a thin, well-focused electron beam is required.

== Structure ==
A Wehnelt cap has the shape of a topless, hollow cylinder. The bottom side of the cylinder has an aperture (through hole) located at its center, with a diameter that typically ranges from 200 to 1200 μm. The bottom face of the cylinder is often made from platinum or tantalum foil.

== Operation ==
A Wehnelt acts as a control grid and it also serves as a convergent electrostatic lens. An electron emitter is positioned directly above the Wehnelt aperture, and an anode is located below the Wehnelt. The anode is biased to a high positive voltage (typically +1 kV to +30 kV) relative to the emitter so as to accelerate electrons from the emitter towards the anode, thus creating an electron beam that passes through the Wehnelt aperture.

The Wehnelt is biased to a negative voltage (typically −200V to −300V) relative to the emitter, which is usually a tungsten filament or Lanthanum hexaboride (LaB_{6}) hot cathode with a V-shaped (or otherwise pointed) tip. This bias voltage creates a repulsive electrostatic field that suppresses emission of electrons from most areas of the cathode.

The emitter tip is positioned near the Wehnelt aperture so that, when appropriate bias voltage is applied to the Wehnelt, a small region of the tip has a net electric field (due to both anode attraction and Wehnelt repulsion) that allows emission from only that area of the tip. The Wehnelt bias voltage determines the tip's emission area, which in turn determines both the beam current and effective size of the beam's electron source.

As the Wehnelt's negative bias voltage increases, the tip's emitting area (and along with it, the beam diameter and beam current) will decrease until it becomes so small that the beam is "pinched" off. In normal operation, the bias is typically set slightly more positive than the pinch bias, and determined by a balance between desired beam quality and beam current.

The Wehnelt bias controls beam focusing as well as the effective size of the electron source, which is essential for creating an electron beam that is to be focussed into a very small spot (for scanning electron microscopy) or a very parallel beam (for diffraction). Although a smaller source can be imaged to a smaller spot, or a more parallel beam, one obvious trade off is a smaller total beam current.
