= Walter-Gropius-Haus (Berlin) =

Apartment building in Berlin, Germany

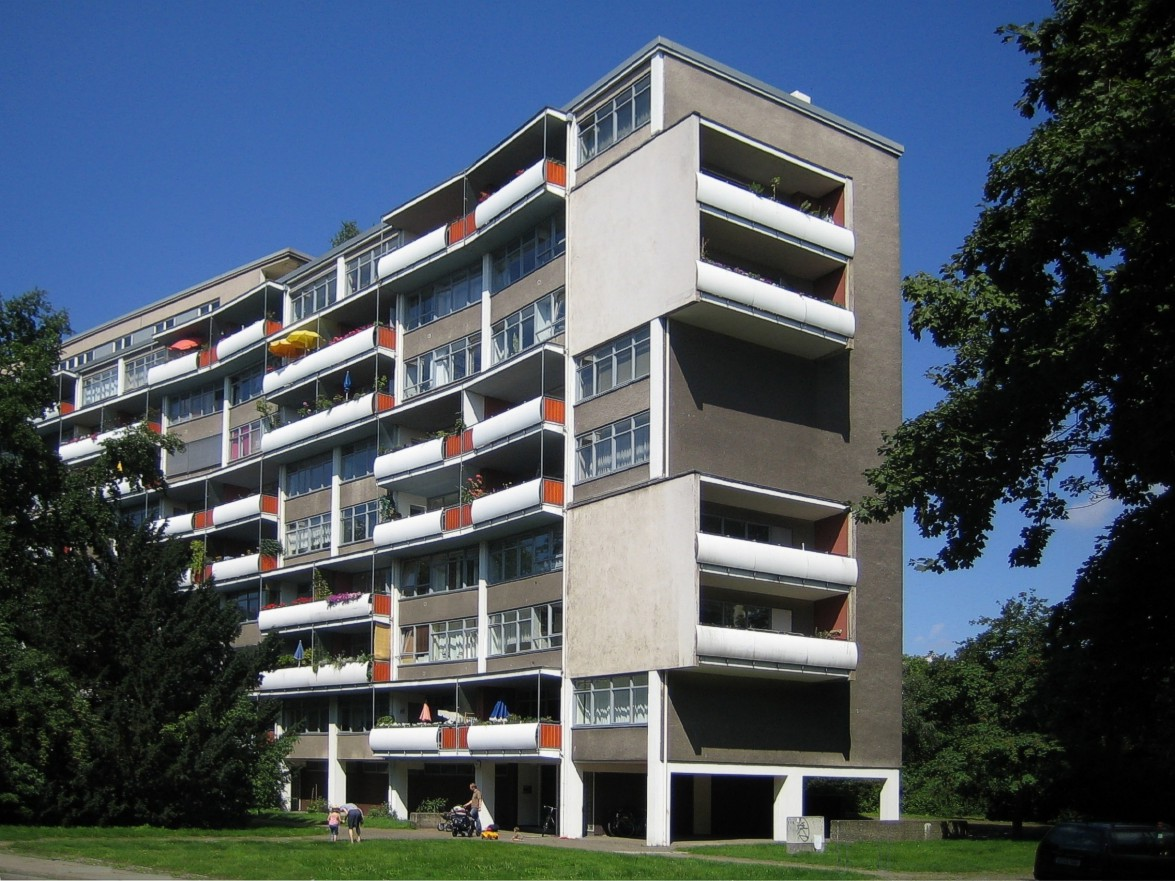
Walter-Gropius-Haus

The Walter Gropius House (also known as Gropiushaus) is a residential building with nine floors and 66 apartments at the Händelallee 1-9 in Berlin Hansaviertel, bordering its central Grosser Tiergarten park. It was designed by Walter Gropius / The Architects' Collaborative - TAC (Cambridge, Massachusetts, US) in collaboration with Wils Ebert, Berlin, on the occasion of the first International Building Exhibition ("Interbau"), in 1957. It is regarded as an important modernist landmark and was declared listed monument in 1980. The actress Marlene Dietrich was instrumental in funding the Interbau project.

== General ==
The Walter Gropius House is one of the 35 completed projects of the International Building Exhibition (Interbau) in 1957. The architects involved in the Interbau were exclusively world-famous modernists, including Alvar Aalto, Egon Eiermann, Walter Gropius, Arne Jacobsen, Vasily Luckhardt, Oscar Niemeyer, Sep Ruf, Max Taut and Le Corbusier. Interbau featured two high-profile contributions by US architectural firms: The Walter Gropius House by TAC and the Kongresshalle (Convention Centre – today: Haus der Kulturen der Welt) by Hugh Stubbins. Hugh Stubbins formerly worked as Walter Gropius' assistant in 1940 at Harvard University.

== Architecture ==
Characteristic features of the Walter Gropius house are its concave structure, textured facade and distinctive narrow sides. The apartments are accessed via four separate doorways, tower-like stairwells and elevator shafts.

The south façade of the building exhibits, besides its characteristic curvature, a richly differentiated structure. It displays a vivid, decorative effect by the graphic arrangement of the protruding balconies, white, sail-like vaulted balustrades as well as colored, glazed balustrade elements. It stands in stark contrast to the formal and functional rigor of the Bauhaus housing projects realized by Walter Gropius before the Second World War. The ground plans of the three and a half room apartments are largely identical. They differ mainly in the position of the balconies, which are grouped into groups of four, thus creating a distinctive "checkerboard pattern" alternating with the window areas and concrete plaster walls. A further special feature is the design of the narrow sides: whereas linear block (Zeilenbau) buildings typically feature windowless narrow sides, Gropius has rotated four apartments at both ends of the building in the east and / or west direction. These eight "twisted" apartments with their protruding loggias give the building a distinctive side view and also add interest to the main view through its flanks, which are executed in concrete plaster. The underside of the balconies were painted in powdery blue, the side balconies separating the adjoining balconies were brick-red, the building overhang of the eastern narrow side was emphasized by an dusky pink color. The four entrance doors are bright red, yellow, blue and green. The north-facing view is marked by the four tower-like staircases and elevator shafts. The north side is less colorful than the southern main view but features subtly differentiated surfaces: the height of the four staircase towers is emphasized by vertical grooves. The staircase towers are built partly inside, partly outside the building's body and originally also contained garbage chute shafts. The ground floor is surrounded by vertically grooved, matte brown ceramic tiles. Inside the stairwells, the side walls are veneered by brickwork, the sides of the walls are highlighted in bright yellow plaster. The vestibules of the four entrances are illuminated by glass blocks and are individualized with colorful ceramic tiles. At the side of the house is a storage room for bicycles. On the top floor, there are two penthouse apartments with large roof terraces.

The ground plans of the apartments are based on Gropius's contribution to the Siemensstadt settlement of 1929-30. To the north are two bedrooms and a bathroom, to the south a living room, kitchen and another bedroom. Since the house is built as a concrete skeleton, the apartments have only a few load-bearing walls, so that open-plan kitchen/living-areas can be created. The apartment doors are partly ceiling-high and equipped with aluminum handles. Originally, all windows were designed as filigree steel frame constructions. As steel frames had exceeded the budget, Gropius donned wooden windows with frames painted in a grey tone, mimicking steel. In order to save the desired filigree effect, the wooden frames of the south-facing windows were sloped by combining rotary window with fixed windows. There is no basement. Storerooms and laundry rooms are located on the ground floor.

== History ==
The organizers of Interbau deliberately did not invite to architectural competitions, but instead put their trust in the appeal of internationally renowned "starchitects", which received an invitation to participate. The architects used a city - planning design by Gerhard Jobst and Willy Kreuer, who designed an "informal" and "natural composition" of the building, as well as the guiding words by Aachen professor Erich Kühn: "easy - cheerful - comfortable - festive - colored - radiant - cozy ". Walter Gropius translated these leitmotivs almost literally into architecture and represented them in a convincing and visually attractive way. For this reason, and also because of the pulling power of the name Gropius, the building was positioned as a public magnet close to the south-western main entrance of Interbau.

== Green areas ==
The green spaces of the entire Hansaviertel were conceived as an integrated masterplan within the framework of Interbau and were executed by ten internationally renowned landscape architects. In doing so, the borders between the adjoining Grosser Tiergarten park and the new residential district should be deliberately blurred. The city planning concept articulated this as one of its main goal: "Within a few years the new Hansaviertel will have fully grown into the Tiergarten". The green spaces originally set up for Interbau in the surroundings of the Walter Gropius House (Section I) have been by the garden architects Herrmann Mattern (Kassel) and René Pechère (Brussels). Today, they have partly outgrown its original plans. Also, additional trees have been planted, such as the oak trees that today block some of the views on the Walter Gropius House.
