= Arthur Wehnelt =

German physicist

- Born: April 4, 1871; Rio de Janeiro
- Died: February 15, 1944 (aged 72); Berlin
- Education: Friedrich-Wilhelms University
- Known for: Wehnelt cathode Wehnelt cylinder Wehnelt interrupter
- Awards: John Scott Medal (1905)
- Scientific career
- Fields: Physics (X-ray physics, gas discharges and electron emission)

Arthur Rudolph Berthold Wehnelt (April 4, 1871 – February 15, 1944) was a German physicist, noted for important contributions in the fields of X-ray physics, gas discharges and electron emission.

== Life ==
Wehnelt's parents returned to Germany from Brazil when he was still a boy. He studied physics at the Technische Hochschule Charlottenburg, and from 1893 to 1897 at the Friedrich-Wilhelms University in Berlin. He received his PhD in 1898 in Erlangen. He taught as a lecturer from 1901 and associate professor of physics from 1904 at the Friedrich-Alexander University Erlangen-Nuremberg. He moved again in 1906 to the University of Berlin, where he taught until his retirement in 1937 as a professor and research. In 1934 he was appointed director of the Physics Department.

== Work ==
In 1899, he invented the Wehnelt interrupter for induction coils. This device used a platinum electrode immersed in electrolyte. When current was passed through it the gas bubbles evolved caused repeated interruption in the current. It was able to develop higher voltages from induction coils, and was widely employed in the large induction coils that powered early x-ray machines until the 1920s.

Much of Wehnelt's research dealt with thermionic emission, the emission of electrons in vacuum tubes. In this context, he developed in 1902/03 the Wehnelt cylinder, an electrode used in electron guns. In 1904 he developed what is arguably his most important invention, the Wehnelt or oxide cathode for vacuum tubes. He found that when the cathode in a vacuum tube is coated with an alkaline earth metal oxide, such as calcium oxide or barium oxide, its work function is reduced, causing it to emit electrons more rapidly. The oxide cathode became the standard type of cathode used in vacuum tubes to the present day.

== Awards and honors ==
- John Scott Medal (1905)
