= Ter Meulen =

Dutch department store chain

- The Binnenwegplein store at Christmas, 1965
- Type: Besloten vennootschap (private limited company)
- Industry: Retail
- Founded: September 26, 1897
- Founder: Hendricus (Hein) Bernardus Johannes ter Meulen
- Defunct: January 13, 1993
- Fate: Bankruptcy
- Headquarters: Rotterdam, Netherlands
- Key people: Ernst ter Meulen (director from 1936)
- Products: Department stores, mail order
- Owner: Goudsmit (Wolters Schaberg group), from 1988

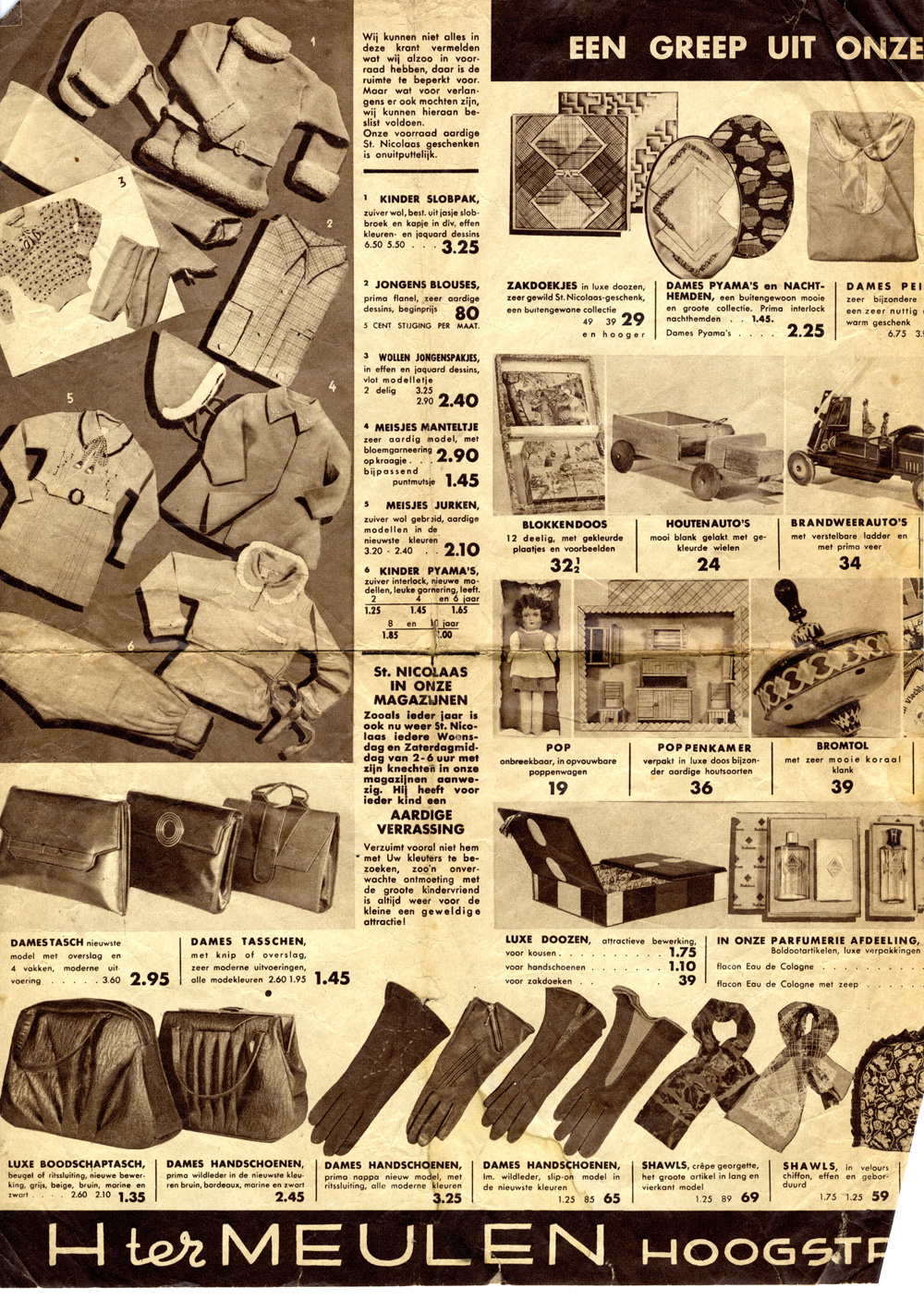
December catalogue from 1939

Ter Meulen was a Dutch department store chain based in Rotterdam. It began as a drapery shop in 1897 and went bankrupt in 1993. Its store on the Binnenwegplein, designed by Van den Broek en Bakema and opened in 1951, was one of the first major buildings of Rotterdam's post-war reconstruction. It survives beneath the residential tower De Karel Doorman, added in 2012.

The company's mail order business, Ter Meulen Post, was founded in 1954 and sold in 1986. By 1992 it had about 700,000 customers. It was taken over by the German Klingel group in 1993.

== History ==
Hein ter Meulen opened his first shop on 26 September 1897, on the corner of the Nieuwe Markt and the Halstraat. He relied on low prices, job lots and conspicuous advertising. The shop moved to the filled-in Slaak in 1903 and to the Hoogstraat in 1912. In 1921 a purpose-built department store opened on the Hoogstraat near the Oostplein, with 32 departments on three floors and around 100 staff. After the founder's sudden death his widow ran the business, and Ernst ter Meulen became director in 1936.

The Hoogstraat store was destroyed in the bombing of Rotterdam in May 1940. Until 1951 Ter Meulen traded from the Dijkzigt complex of temporary shops, next door to the clothing firm Wassen. The shoe retailer Van Vorst was also in the complex. Work on a permanent store on the Binnenwegplein began in 1948, and it opened on 1 March 1951. A mail order business followed in 1954.

A branch in Spijkenisse was announced in 1982. Others followed in Dordrecht, Zoetermeer, Almere and the Oosterhof shopping centre in Rotterdam. In 1986 the mail order business was split off and sold to Vendex International (later Maxeda), the owner of Vroom & Dreesmann.

The department stores were sold in 1988 to Goudsmit, the listed retail fund of the investment group Wolters Schaberg, which specialised in taking over underperforming businesses. The new owners aimed to open a store a year. Construction delays meant that the Oosterhof and Almere stores both opened within four months in 1992, a strain on the company's finances. From 1989 parts of the Binnenwegplein store were let to other retailers.

In early January 1993 NRC Handelsblad reported that Ter Meulen was close to bankruptcy. The chain was declared bankrupt on 13 January. According to the company's former financial director, all 550 employees were dismissed. The receivers kept the shops open to sell the remaining stock, bringing in the Steenbergen family of the Kwantum chain to run the closing-down sale. Vroom & Dreesmann took over some of the branches and converted them to V&D stores.

== Binnenwegplein building ==
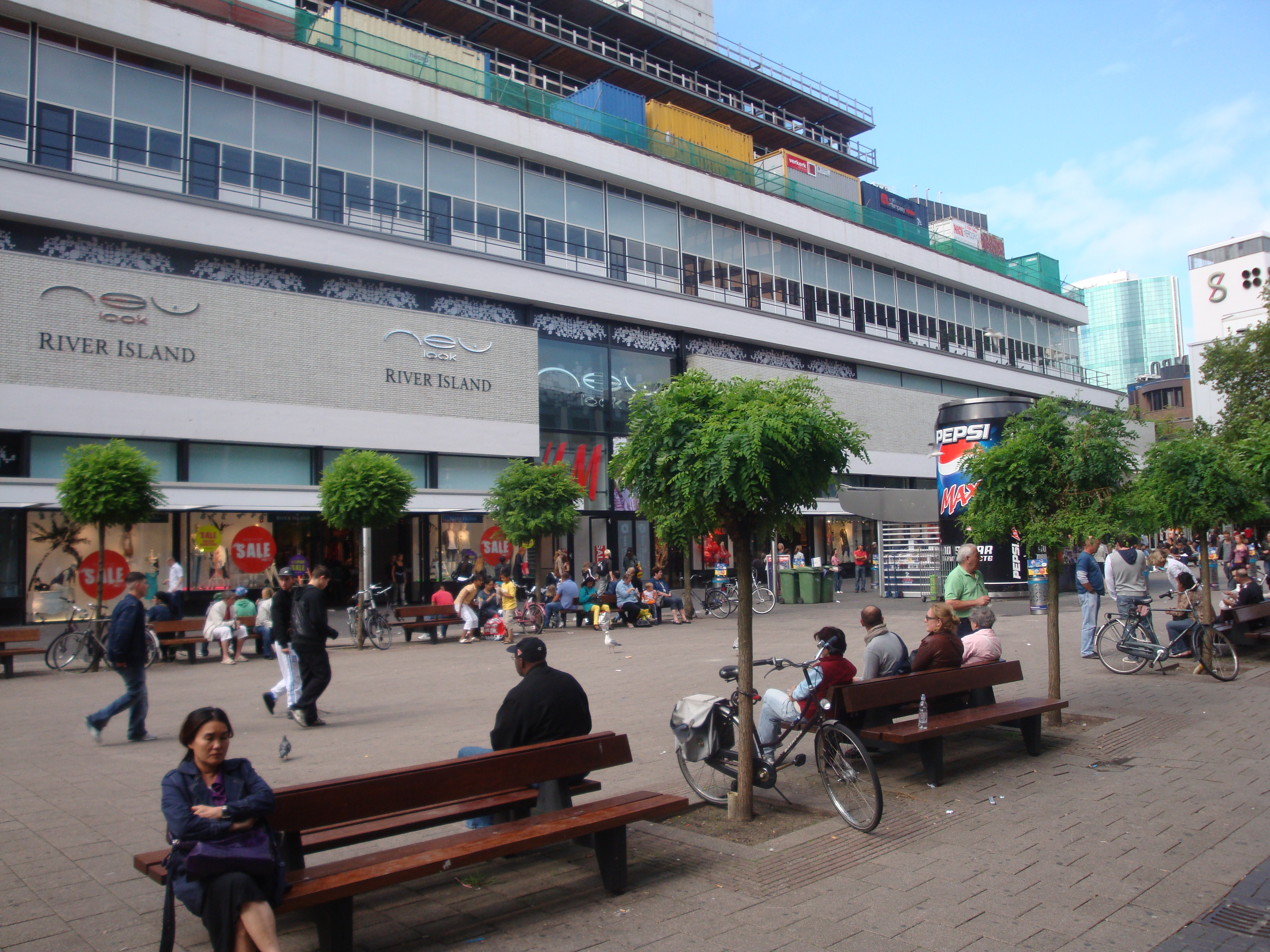
The Ter Meulen building in 2006

Ter Meulen put up the Binnenwegplein building jointly with Wassen and Van Vorst. Wassen, founded by Frans Wassen, sold babywear and women's clothing and had been on the Goudsesingel since 1929. Van Vorst had sold shoes in Rotterdam since before 1850. The architects, Van den Broek en Bakema, were designing the Lijnbaan at the same time. Marc Ibelings, whose firm later renovated the building, has called it the first building of the city's reconstruction, completed before the Lijnbaan.

The building is about 100 metres long and 29 deep. Each firm had its own shopfront and entrance, and inside the three shops were separated by glass walls. Jo van den Broek had seen windowless department stores on a study trip to the United States and rejected the idea. The ground floor is one long shop window, and strip windows run along the upper floors. There were three sales floors, from the basement up. The top floor held offices, storerooms and a canteen. A tearoom, Martin's Cafetaria, occupied a mezzanine on the eastern corner and had its own entrance.

Ter Meulen absorbed Wassen in 1963. The Lijnbaan was extended to the Binnenwegplein in the late 1960s. The café corner was lost, and a bridge building was put up to link Ter Meulen with the De Klerk furniture store. Van den Broek en Bakema also designed a two-storey rooftop extension, begun in 1977 and finished in 1979, which added about 4,000 m² of shop space.

After the bankruptcy the building was renovated and reopened in 1993 as De Grote Lijn, a new retail concept that failed. Chains including H&M and Zara continued to rent space there. As of 2019, the building was not a listed monument. When Ibelings van Tilburg Architecten were engaged in 2001, the brief assumed it would be demolished and replaced. The architects proposed keeping it instead. Ibelings had previously worked for Van den Broek en Bakema.

The 1979 extension was removed, and a residential block of steel and timber was built on top of the restored store. It rests on the original columns and foundations, with two new concrete cores for stability. Its floors weigh about a fifth of conventional concrete ones. The project, also known as Linea Nova, was completed in 2012 as De Karel Doorman. It is about 70 metres tall and has 114 apartments in two towers of different heights, with two parking levels on the old roof and a shared roof garden. According to the architects, it won the public vote in the BNA Building of the Year awards for 2013.

As of 2020, the former store was let mainly to TK Maxx, with H&M and Zara also in the building. The architects give its retail floor area as about 12,450 m².

== Ter Meulen Post ==
The mail order business started in 1954 and at first used storage space in the RAC garage in Rotterdam. Its catalogues were illustrated with drawings rather than photographs for many years. The December toy range was popular with families in the 1950s and 1960s.

A distribution centre was built on the Vlaardingweg in the Spaanse Polder in 1967, and the business had moved there by 1969. Van den Broek en Bakema were again the architects, and J.P. van Eesteren the contractor. The estimated cost was 10 million guilders. The five-storey steel-framed building measures 80 by 78 metres and stands on 630 concrete piles. It was designed so that three more storeys could be added. Its equipment included a conveyor system, an ICT machine for stock records and a roof terrace for staff. The building was later raised. Now called De Spaanse Kubus, it is let as business space, which as of 2016 included several data centers. The city designated it a municipal monument in 2022.

By 1992 Ter Meulen Post had about 700,000 customers in the Netherlands and Flanders, a turnover of around 100 million guilders, and shipped 2.5 million parcels a year. It was then the only Dutch mail order company with its own transport department. It had been losing money for years, and Vendex no longer counted it as a core business. In early 1992 Vendex sold a slimmed-down company to the British firm Freemans, then part of Sears plc. The sale cost 320 of its 440 jobs, including the 130 staff of the transport department, which was taken over by the Nedlloyd division VGL/Selectvracht.

Ter Meulen Post lost 9 million guilders in 1992. The bankruptcy of the department stores hurt it further, because many customers assumed the two businesses were still connected. In July 1993 the director, G.E.J. ter Meulen, announced that the company would close. On 1 October 1993 the German Klingel group took over its activities, buying the name, the customer address list and much of the fixtures and equipment, and keeping 55 of the remaining 100 staff.
