= Hansaviertel =

- Quarter of Berlin
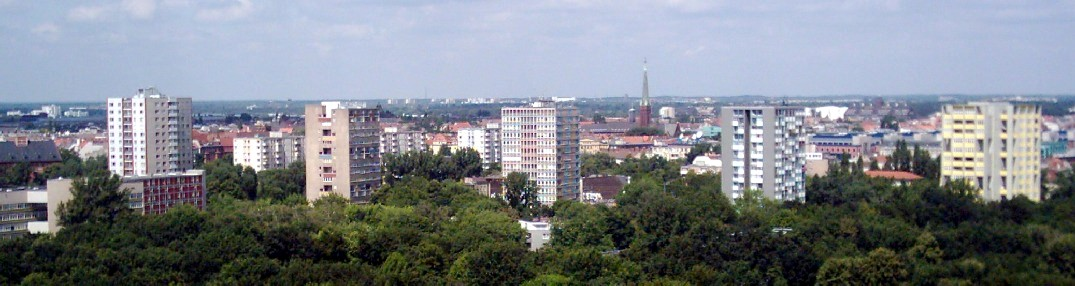
- Panoramic view

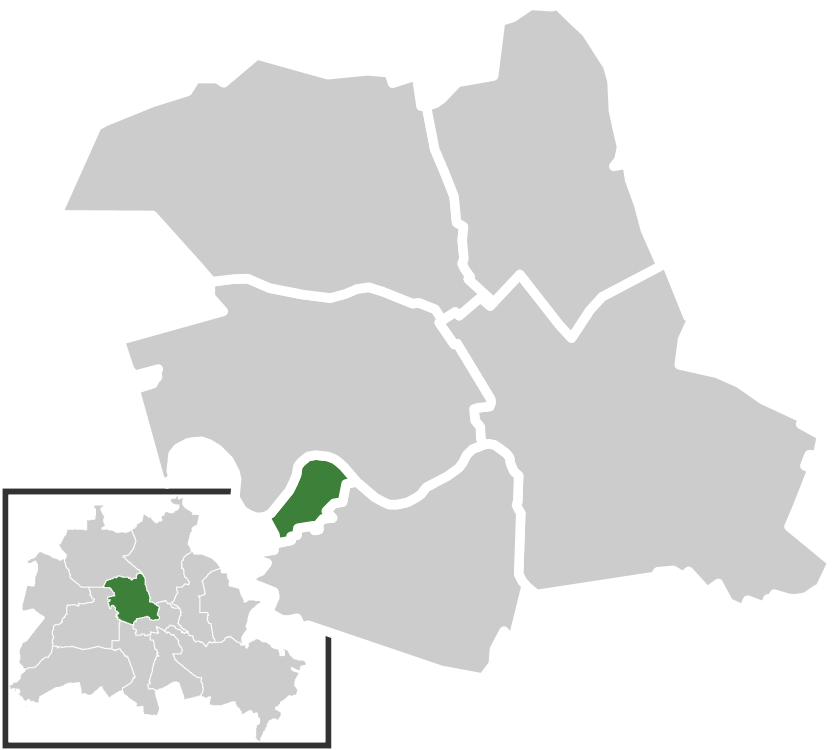
- Location of Hansaviertel in Mitte district and Berlin
- Interactive map of Hansaviertel
- Location within Germany Location within Berlin
- Coordinates: 52°31′00″N 13°20′20″E
- Country: Germany
- State: Berlin
- City: Berlin
- Borough: Mitte
- Founded: 1762

Area
  - Total: 0.53 km^{2} (0.20 sq mi)
- Elevation: 52 m (171 ft)

Population (2024-12-31)
  - Total: 6,170
  - Density: 12,000/km^{2} (30,000/sq mi)
- Time zone: UTC+01:00 (CET)
  - Summer (DST): UTC+02:00 (CEST)
- Postal codes: 10555, 10557
- Vehicle registration: B

The Hansaviertel (German: [ˈhanzaˌfɪʁtl̩]) is the smallest Ortsteil (district) of Berlin and is between Großer Tiergarten and the Spree River, within the central Mitte borough of Berlin.

The district was almost completely destroyed during World War II but was rebuilt from 1957 to 1961 as a social housing project by international master architects such as Alvar Aalto, Egon Eiermann, Walter Gropius, Oscar Niemeyer, and Sep Ruf. Called Interbau, the whole ensemble has two churches, St. Ansgar (catholic) and Kaiser-Friedrich-Gedächtniskirche (protestant). It is now protected as a historic monument.

== History ==
The area's streets are named after "Hansa cities"; cities that were part of the Hanseatic League, a trading network established in the Middle Ages. Hansaplatz, the central square, has a small shopping arcade, a library and the Grips-Theater. Hansaplatz subway station was built in 1957, though the U9 line did not open until 1961. Some Gründerzeit buildings remained north of the Stadtbahn railway. Altonaer Straße, named after the Altona district in Hamburg, leads to the Victory Column. Bellevue Palace, the residence of the German president is nearby.

== Hansaplatz ==
Right beside the U-bahn train station is Hansaplatz square. Now an unremarkable traffic junction, this was an active plaza before the war.

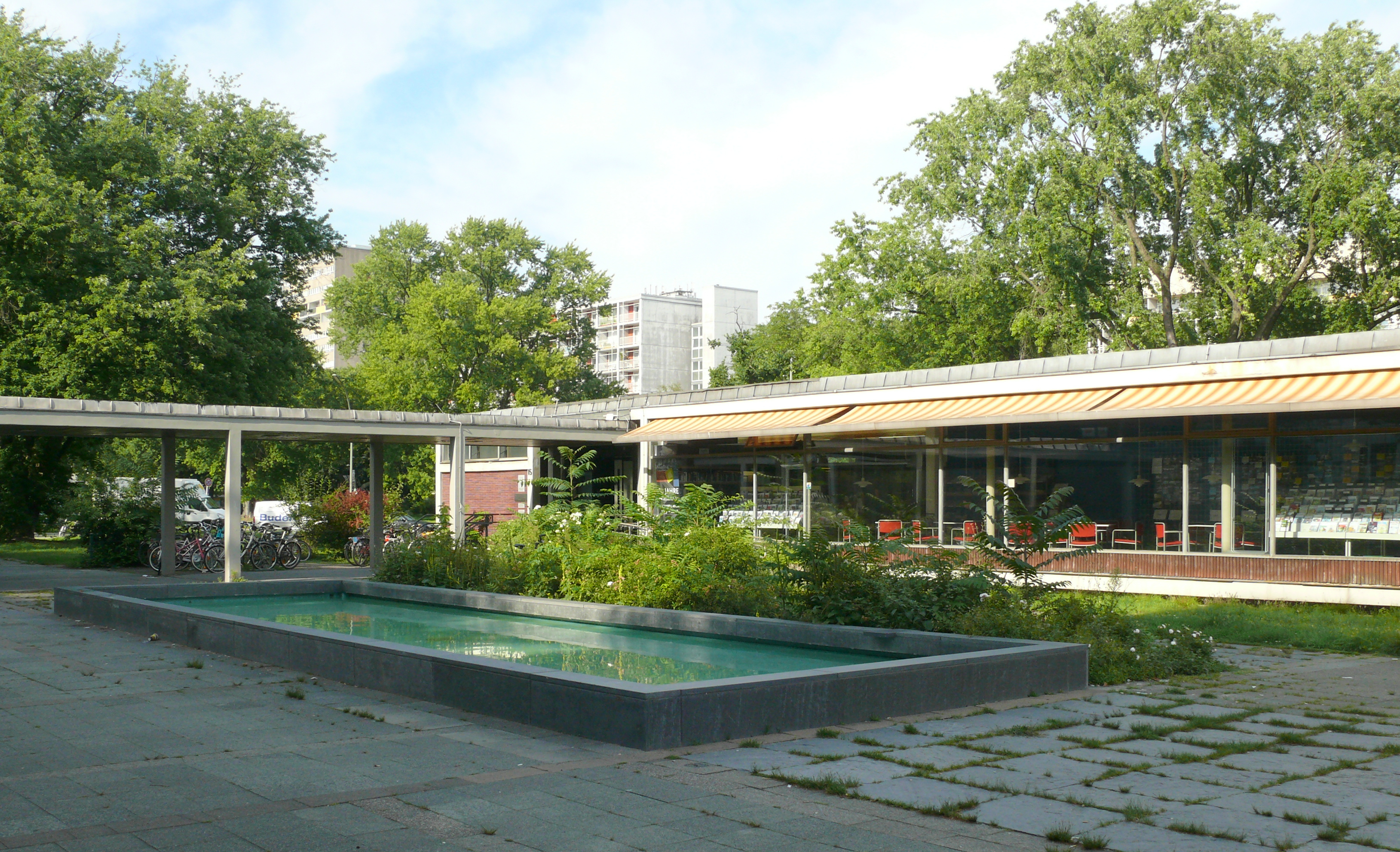
Hansaplatz

== People, who lived in Hansaviertel ==
- Marie Wreschner (physicist and early cancer researcher)
- Rosa Luxemburg (left politician)
- Käthe Kollwitz (artist)
- Nelly Sachs (writer)
- Else Lasker-Schüler (poet)
- Kurt Tucholsky (writer)
- Max Reinhardt (theatre director)
- Heinrich George (actor)
- Botho zu Eulenburg (prussian minister-president in 19th century)
- Julius Carl Raschdorff (architect of Berliner Dom)
