= Districts and neighbourhoods of Rotterdam =

The Dutch municipality Rotterdam is divided into districts and neighbourhoods for statistical purposes. The municipality is divided into the following statistical districts:

- District 01 Stadscentrum (CBS-districtcode:059901)
- District 03 Delfshaven (CBS-districtcode:059903)
- District 04 Overschie (CBS-districtcode:059904)
- District 05 Noord (CBS-districtcode:059905)
- District 06 Hillegersberg-Schiebroek (CBS-districtcode:059906)
- District 08 Kralingen-Crooswijk (CBS-districtcode:059908)
- District 10 Feijenoord (CBS-districtcode:059910)
- District 12 IJsselmonde (CBS-districtcode:059912)
- District 13 Pernis (CBS-districtcode:059913)
- District 14 Prins Alexander (CBS-districtcode:059914)
- District 15 Charlois (CBS-districtcode:059915)
- District 16 Hoogvliet (CBS-districtcode:059916)
- District 17 Hook of Holland (CBS-districtcode:059917)
- District 18 Spaanse Polder (CBS-districtcode:059918)
- District 19 Nieuw Mathenesse (CBS-districtcode:059919)
- District 21 Waalhaven-Eemhaven (CBS-districtcode:059921)
- District 22 Vondelingenplaat (CBS-districtcode:059922)
- District 23 Botlek-Europoort-Maasvlakte (CBS-districtcode:059923)
- District 24 Rotterdam-Noord-West (CBS-districtcode:059924)
- District 25 Rivium (CBS-districtcode:059925)
- District 26 Bedrijventerrein Schieveen (CBS-districtcode:059926)
- District 27 Rozenburg (CBS-districtcode:059927)

A statistical district may consist of several neighbourhoods. The table below shows the neighbourhood division with characteristic values according to the Statistics Netherlands (CBS, 2008):

CBS-neighbourhood code	Neighbourhood name	Population	Area total (ha)	Area land (ha)	Position
BU05990110	Stadsdriehoek	12060	172	134	Locatie in de gemeente
BU05990111	Oude Westen	9500	59	59	Locatie in de gemeente
BU05990112	Cool	4210	61	61	Locatie in de gemeente
BU05990113	C.S. kwartier	970	39	39	Locatie in de gemeente
BU05990117	Kop van Zuid; number and map are dated, since 3 March 2010 part of Feijenoord	1050	75	26	Locatie in de gemeente
BU05990118	Nieuwe Werk	1660	99	70	Locatie in de gemeente
BU05990119	Dijkzigt	640	51	49	Locatie in de gemeente
BU05990320	Delfshaven	6280	53	41	Locatie in de gemeente
BU05990321	Bospolder	6890	38	38	Locatie in de gemeente
BU05990322	Tussendijken	6290	40	37	Locatie in de gemeente
BU05990323	Spangen	9520	64	59	Locatie in de gemeente
BU05990324	Nieuwe Westen	18600	122	122	Locatie in de gemeente
BU05990325	Middelland	11050	70	70	Locatie in de gemeente
BU05990327	Oud-Mathenesse	6400	82	82	Locatie in de gemeente
BU05990328	Witte Dorp	580	4	4	Locatie in de gemeente
BU05990329	Schiemond	4290	106	51	Locatie in de gemeente
BU05990451	Kleinpolder	7290	131	125	Locatie in de gemeente
BU05990452	Noord-Kethel	70	253	241	Locatie in de gemeente
BU05990454	Schieveen	420	429	422	Locatie in de gemeente
BU05990455	Zestienhoven	880	590	573	Locatie in de gemeente
BU05990456	Overschie	6700	169	147	Locatie in de gemeente
BU05990457	Landzicht	400	8	8	Locatie in de gemeente
BU05990515	Agniesebuurt	4080	36	36	Locatie in de gemeente
BU05990516	Provenierswijk	4420	30	30	Locatie in de gemeente
BU05990531	Bergpolder	7450	46	45	Locatie in de gemeente
BU05990532	Blijdorp	9300	168	162	Locatie in de gemeente
BU05990534	Liskwartier	7340	59	57	Locatie in de gemeente
BU05990535	Oude Noorden	16600	106	101	Locatie in de gemeente
BU05990558	Blijdorpse polder	100	91	85	Locatie in de gemeente
BU05990660	Schiebroek	15160	493	487	Locatie in de gemeente
BU05990661	Hillegersberg-Zuid	7620	127	119	Locatie in de gemeente
BU05990662	Hillegersberg-Noord	7040	306	188	Locatie in de gemeente
BU05990664	Terbregge	3470	188	179	Locatie in de gemeente
BU05990665	Molenlaankwartier	7560	214	203	Locatie in de gemeente
BU05990814	Rubroek	7820	53	52	Locatie in de gemeente
BU05990836	Nieuw-Crooswijk	2770	111	104	Locatie in de gemeente
BU05990837	Oud-Crooswijk	7820	54	49	Locatie in de gemeente
BU05990841	Kralingen-West	15370	105	105	Locatie in de gemeente
BU05990842	Kralingen-Oost	6690	204	202	Locatie in de gemeente
BU05990843	Kralingse Bos	120	446	327	Locatie in de gemeente
BU05990845	De Esch	4350	243	169	Locatie in de gemeente
BU05990847	Struisenburg	4400	61	38	Locatie in de gemeente
BU05991079	Kop van Zuid-Entrepot	7640	82	74	Locatie in de gemeente
BU05991080	Vreewijk	13950	204	203	Locatie in de gemeente
BU05991081	Bloemhof	13180	80	80	Locatie in de gemeente
BU05991082	Hillesluis	10660	90	90	Locatie in de gemeente
BU05991085	Katendrecht	3660	119	56	Locatie in de gemeente
BU05991086	Afrikaanderwijk	9300	48	48	Locatie in de gemeente
BU05991087	Feijenoord	7420	100	63	Locatie in de gemeente
BU05991088	Noordereiland	3280	67	25	Locatie in de gemeente
BU05991283	Oud-IJsselmonde	5790	315	196	Locatie in de gemeente
BU05991284	Lombardijen	13110	261	260	Locatie in de gemeente
BU05991289	Groot-IJsselmonde	26960	583	578	Locatie in de gemeente
BU05991290	Beverwaard	12140	152	149	Locatie in de gemeente
BU05991391	Pernis	4740	160	160	Locatie in de gemeente
BU05991444	's-Gravenland	8520	223	208	Locatie in de gemeente
BU05991446	Kralingse Veer	1710	64	50	Locatie in de gemeente
BU05991448	Prinsenland	10160	179	171	Locatie in de gemeente
BU05991449	Het Lage Land	9630	216	214	Locatie in de gemeente
BU05991463	Ommoord	24260	448	438	Locatie in de gemeente
BU05991466	Zevenkamp	16980	216	213	Locatie in de gemeente
BU05991467	Oosterflank	10630	164	161	Locatie in de gemeente
BU05991468	Nesselande	7340	513	398	Locatie in de gemeente
BU05991571	Tarwewijk	10800	113	84	Locatie in de gemeente
BU05991572	Carnisse	9960	62	62	Locatie in de gemeente
BU05991573	Zuidwijk	12160	153	153	Locatie in de gemeente
BU05991574	Oud-Charlois	12590	149	135	Locatie in de gemeente
BU05991575	Wielewaal	960	21	21	Locatie in de gemeente
BU05991576	Zuidplein	880	26	26	Locatie in de gemeente
BU05991577	Pendrecht	11890	123	123	Locatie in de gemeente
BU05991578	Zuiderpark	1250	521	499	Locatie in de gemeente
BU05991593	Heijplaat	1610	41	41	Locatie in de gemeente
BU05991692	Hoogvliet-Noord	13260	532	502	Locatie in de gemeente
BU05991699	Hoogvliet-Zuid	21640	541	480	Locatie in de gemeente
BU05991701	Strand en Duin	1150	468	370	Locatie in de gemeente
BU05991702	Dorp	8180	381	326	Locatie in de gemeente
BU05991703	Rijnpoort	70	896	704	Locatie in de gemeente
BU05991853	Spaanse Polder	160	204	185	Locatie in de gemeente
BU05991926	Nieuw-Mathenesse	20	218	134	Locatie in de gemeente
BU05992194	Waalhaven	10	618	257	Locatie in de gemeente
BU05992196	Eemhaven	30	680	452	Locatie in de gemeente
BU05992198	Waalhaven-Zuid	0	187	186	Locatie in de gemeente
BU05992295	Vondelingenplaat	0	911	683	Locatie in de gemeente
BU05992306	Botlek	0	2474	1630	Locatie in de gemeente
BU05992307	Europoort	0	3405	1844	Locatie in de gemeente
BU05992308	Maasvlakte	0	3941	2385	Locatie in de gemeente
BU05992459	Bedrijventerrein Rotterdam Noord-West	10	117	111	Locatie in de gemeente
BU05992540	Rivium	0	11	11	Locatie in de gemeente
BU05992650	Bedrijventerrein Schieveen	0	152	152	Locatie in de gemeente
BU05992704	Rozenburg	12380	xxx	xxx	{{{map}}}
BU05992705	Noordzeeweg	0	xxx	xxx	{{{map}}}
