= Reyeroord =

Coordinates: 51°52′51″N 4°33′24″E

- Neighborhood of Rotterdam
- Interactive map of Reyeroord
- Country: Netherlands
- Province: South Holland
- COROP: Rotterdam
- Borough: IJsselmonde
- Time zone: UTC+1 (CET)

Reyeroord is a neighborhood of Rotterdam, Netherlands. Constructed in the post-war period, it is located in Rotterdam west of A16, north of A15, east of Hordijkerveld. It is part of the IJsselmonde burrough. It has been the site of urban innovation and development. It shares the public park Oeverloos with Hordijkerveld.
