= Smeetsland =

Neighborhood in Rotterdam, The Netherlands

Coordinates: 51°52′51″N 4°31′10″E

- Neighborhood
- Interactive map of Smeetsland
- Country: Netherlands
- Province: South Holland
- COROP: Rotterdam
- Borough: IJsselmonde
- Time zone: UTC+1 (CET)

Smeetsland is a neighborhood of Rotterdam, Netherlands.
