= Wielewaal =

Coordinates: 51°52′48″N 4°27′44″E

- Neighborhood of Rotterdam
- Interactive map of Wielewaal
- Country: Netherlands
- Province: South Holland
- COROP: Rotterdam
- Borough: Charlois
- Time zone: UTC+1 (CET)

Wielewaal is a neighborhood of Rotterdam, Netherlands.
