= Sagenbuurt =

Neighborhood in Rotterdam, The Netherlands

Coordinates: 51°53′59″N 4°33′01″E

- Neighborhood of Rotterdam
- Interactive map of Sagenbuurt
- Country: Netherlands
- Province: South Holland
- COROP: Rotterdam
- Borough: IJsselmonde
- Time zone: UTC+1 (CET)

Sagenbuurt is a neighborhood of Rotterdam, Netherlands.
