= Boomgaardshoek =

Coordinates: 51°51′33″N 4°22′31″E

- Neighborhood of Rotterdam
- Interactive map of Boomgaardshoek
- Country: Netherlands
- Province: South Holland
- COROP: Rotterdam
- Borough: Hoogvliet
- Established: 1957-1985
- Time zone: UTC+1 (CET)

Boomgaardshoek is a neighborhood of Rotterdam, Netherlands.

This part of Hoogvliet was built between 1957 and 1985.

When they started building this area, it belonged to Poortugaal, in 1986 it became part of Rotterdam. One part of Boomgaardshoek has bird names and the other part has names of flowers. Those two are separated by a bike lane which comes from south Zalmplaat to North Tussenwater.
