= Homerusbuurt =

Coordinates: 51°52′33″N 4°31′43″E

- Neighborhood of Rotterdam
- Interactive map of Homerusbuurt
- Country: Netherlands
- Province: South Holland
- COROP: Rotterdam
- Borough: IJsselmonde
- Time zone: UTC+1 (CET)

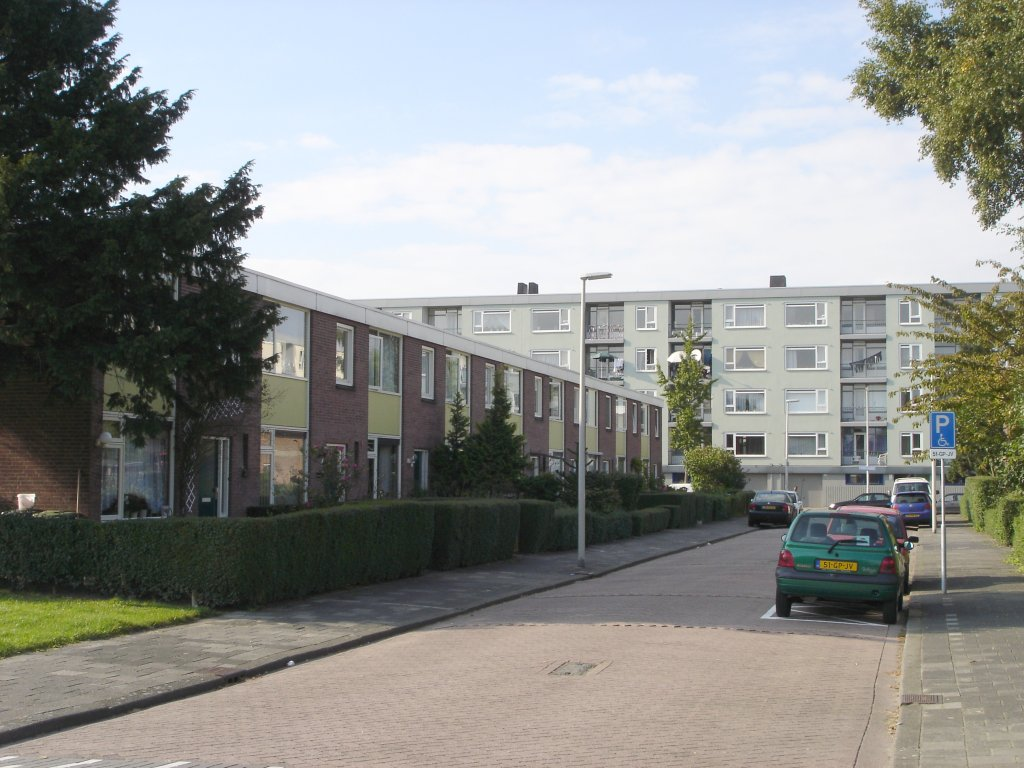
Tacitusstraat in the Homerusbuurt neighborhood of Rotterdam, Netherlands.

Homerusbuurt (Dutch pronunciation: [ɦoːˈmeːrʏzˌbyːrt]) is a neighborhood of Rotterdam, Netherlands. It is situated closely to Lombardijen station. The neighborhood is bounded by the railroad on the east, Spinozaweg on the north, Sophocles-straat on the south and shopping facilities on the west.

Homerusbuurt is a part of a group of neighborhoods called Lombardijen that are organized around Spinoza Park. Homerusbuurt has as neighbors Molierebuurt clockwise and Platostraat counterclockwise.
