= Kreekhuizen =

Coordinates: 51°53′02″N 4°32′12″E

- Neighborhood of Rotterdam
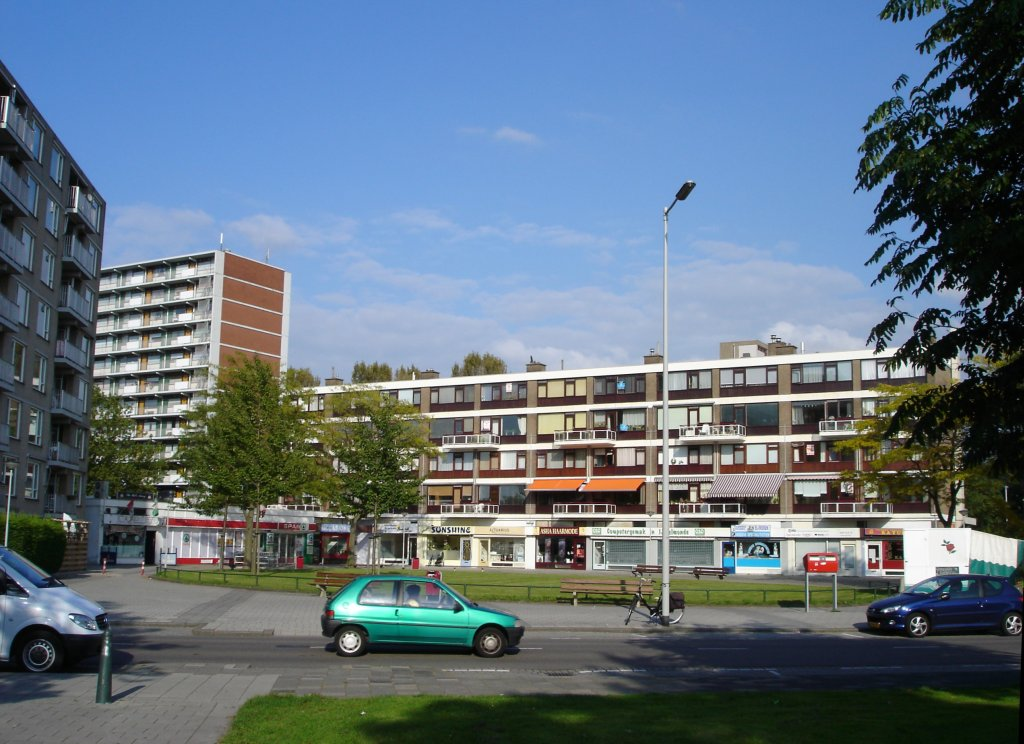
- The Kruisplein in the district of IJsselmonde, a district of Kreekhuizen in Rotterdam.
- Interactive map of Kreekhuizen
- Country: Netherlands
- Province: South Holland
- COROP: Rotterdam
- Borough: IJselmonde
- Time zone: UTC+1 (CET)

Kreekhuizen is a neighborhood of Rotterdam, Netherlands.
