= Rubroek =

Coordinates: 51°55′36″N 4°29′22″E

- Neighborhood of Rotterdam
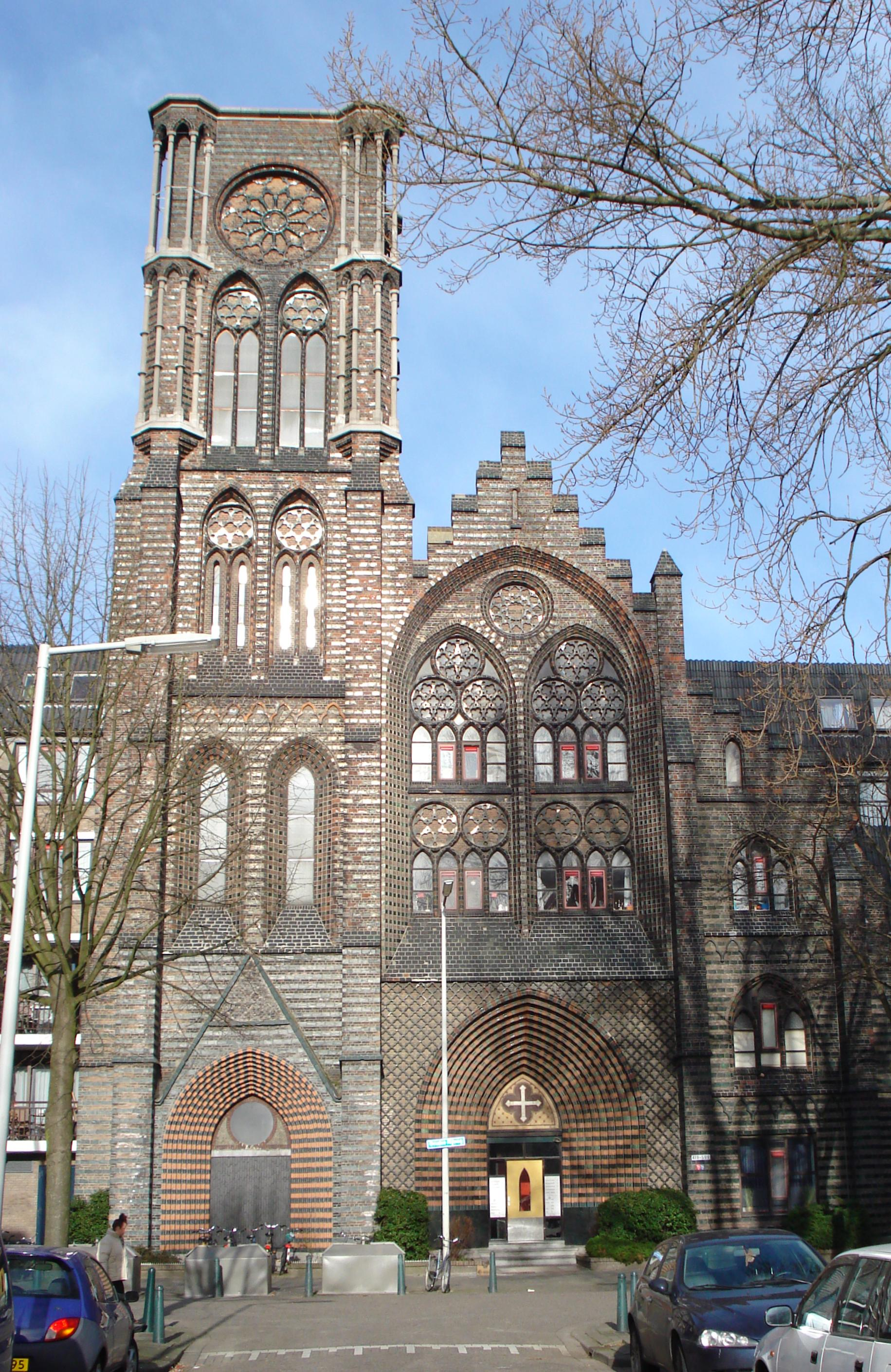

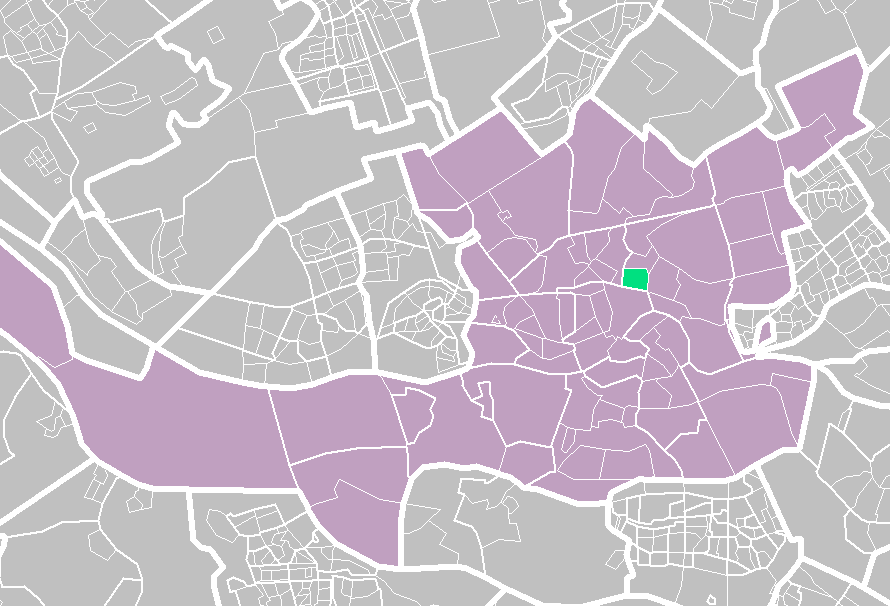
- Country: Netherlands
- Province: South Holland
- COROP: Rotterdam
- Borough: Kralingen-Crooswijk
- Time zone: UTC+1 (CET)

Rubroek is a neighborhood in the Dutch city of Rotterdam. The neighborhood is located near Crooswijk in the Kralingen-Crooswijk district. The neighborhood is often considered an integral part of Crooswijk and is bordered by the Crooswijksesingel to the north, the Boezemkade to the east, situated between the Boezemweg and the Boezem (which in turn forms the watershed between Rubroek/Oud-Crooswijk/Nieuw-Crooswijk/Slachthuisbuurt and the Kralingen district even further east), the Goudsesingel to the south, and the Rotte to the west.

The district borders the Stadsdriehoek, the centre of Rotterdam, and has two major shopping streets: the Jonker Fransstraat and the Goudsesingel.
