= De Veranda =

- Neighborhood of Oud-IJsselmonde
- Location within Netherlands
- Coordinates: 51°53′50″N 4°31′19″E
- Country: Netherlands
- Province: South Holland
- COROP: Rotterdam
- Borough: IJsselmonde
- Time zone: UTC+1 (CET)

De Veranda is a neighborhood within South Holland, in Rotterdam, Netherlands. It is a relatively new development compared to the older surrounding Neighborhoods, such as Oud-Ijsselmonde.
