= Lombardijen =

Coordinates: 51°53′N 4°32′E

- Neighborhood of Rotterdam
- Interactive map of Lombardijen
- Country: Netherlands
- Province: South Holland
- COROP: Rotterdam
- Borough: IJsselmonde
- Time zone: UTC+1 (CET)

Lombardijen is a neighborhood of Rotterdam, Netherlands. It consists of a group of sub-neighborhoods that are organized around Spinoza Park in the western end of the Ijsselmonde borough. Constituent neighborhoods include Homerusbuurt, Molierebuurt, Karlmarxbuurt, and Platostraat.

== History ==
Lombardijen was an area of population expansion in the post-war period and is thus populated with dense housing developments.

== Housing ==
As of 2012, approximately 70% of housing was rental while 30% was privately owned.
