= Struisenburg =

Coordinates: 51°55′04″N 4°30′42″E

- Neighborhood of Rotterdam
- Interactive map of Struisenburg
- Country: Netherlands
- Province: South Holland
- COROP: Rotterdam
- Borough: Kralingen-Crooswijk
- Time zone: UTC+1 (CET)

Struisenburg is a neighborhood of Rotterdam, Netherlands.
