= Oud-Charlois =

Coordinates: 51°53′27″N 4°27′51″E

- Neighborhood of Rotterdam
- Interactive map of Oud-Charlois
- Country: Netherlands
- Province: South Holland
- COROP: Rotterdam
- Borough: Charlois
- Time zone: UTC+1 (CET)

Oud-Charlois is a neighborhood of Rotterdam, Netherlands. It features a charming village center with authentic houses and streets. As of 2025, the population of Oud-Charlois is 13,860.
