= Oud-IJsselmonde =

Coordinates: 51°54′00″N 4°33′08″E

Oud IJsselmonde
- Neighborhood of Rotterdam
- Interactive map of Oud IJsselmonde
- Country: Netherlands
- Province: South Holland
- COROP: Rotterdam
- Borough: IJsselmonde
- Time zone: UTC+1 (CET)

Oud IJsselmonde is a neighbourhood (‘buurt’) in Rotterdam, the Netherlands, with a population of 6,120 in 2024. Oud IJsselmonde comprises the former ‘dike village’ IJsselmonde.
