= Hordijkerveld =

- Neighborhood of Rotterdam
- Interactive map of Hordijkerveld
- Coordinates: 51°53′N 4°33′E
- Country: Netherlands
- Province: South Holland
- COROP: Rotterdam
- Borough: IJsselmonde
- Time zone: UTC+1 (CET)
  - Summer (DST): UTC+2 (CEST)

Hordijkerveld is a neighborhood of Rotterdam, Netherlands.
