= Vondeling =

Vondeling is a Dutch surname. Notable people with the surname include:

- Anne Vondeling (1916–1979), Dutch politician
- Marina Vondeling (born 1986), Dutch politician

== See also ==
- Anne Vondeling prize
- Vondelingenplaat, Rotterdam
