= Groot-IJsselmonde =

Coordinates: 51°53′01″N 4°32′45″E

- Neighborhood of Rotterdam
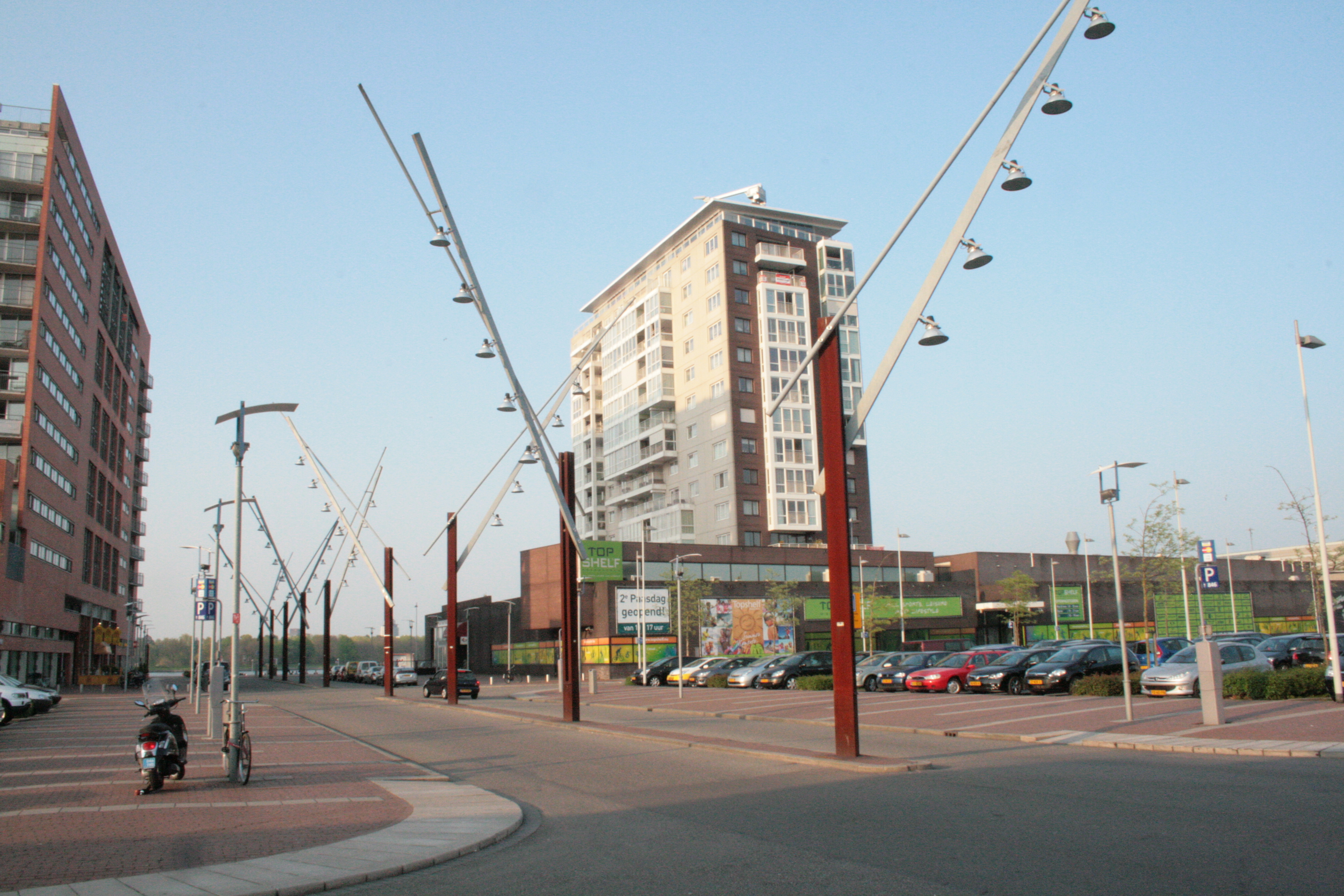
- Cor Kieboomplein
- Interactive map of Groot-IJsselmonde
- Country: Netherlands
- Province: South Holland
- COROP: Rotterdam
- Borough: IJsselmonde
- Time zone: UTC+1 (CET)

Groot-IJsselmonde is a neighborhood of Rotterdam, Netherlands.
