= Zuiderpark (Rotterdam) =

Community park in Rotterdam

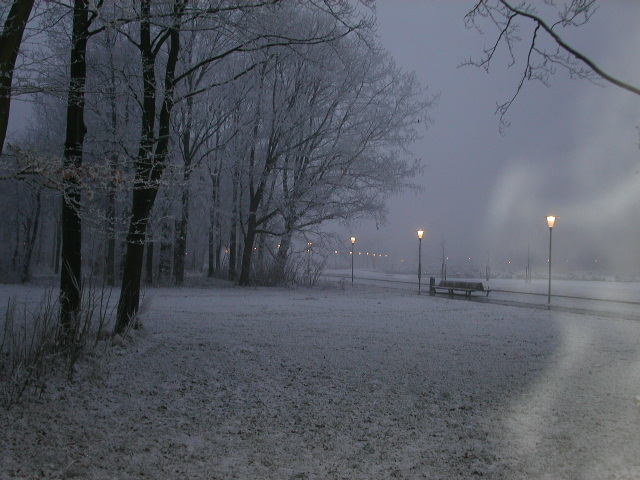
- Type: Community Park
- Location: Charlois, Rotterdam
- Coordinates: 51.880556°N 4.486667°E
- Area: 531.27657015 acres (215.00000000 ha)
- Status: Open
- Website: rotterdam.nl/zuiderpark

The Zuiderpark is a city park in the Rotterdam neighbourhood of Charlois.

== Details ==
With 215 hectares, it is the largest city park in the Netherlands. The park is located between the pre-war neighbourhood of Carnisserbuurt and the post-war neighbourhoods of Zuidwijk and Pendrecht. The park was laid out from 1952 as a utilitarian rather than an ornamental park. The park has several allotment complexes and hosts several Rotterdam football clubs. Several pop festivals have also been held there over the years.

In 2006, the park was greatly renovated. A number of allotments and many trees disappeared in the process. New water features were created for additional water storage capacity.

On the north side of the Zuiderpark is Ahoy Rotterdam, where fairs, pop concerts and sports events are held.
