= Westpunt, Rotterdam =

Coordinates: 51°52′N 4°21′E

Westpunt
- Neighborhood of Rotterdam
- Interactive map of Westpunt
- Country: Netherlands
- Province: South Holland
- COROP: Rotterdam
- Borough: Hoogvliet
- Established: 1954-1959
- Time zone: UTC+1 (CET)

Westpunt is a neighborhood of Rotterdam, Netherlands. It was originally built between 1954-1959 with 2,100 dwellings.
