= Ad van der Steur =

Dutch architect (1893–1953)

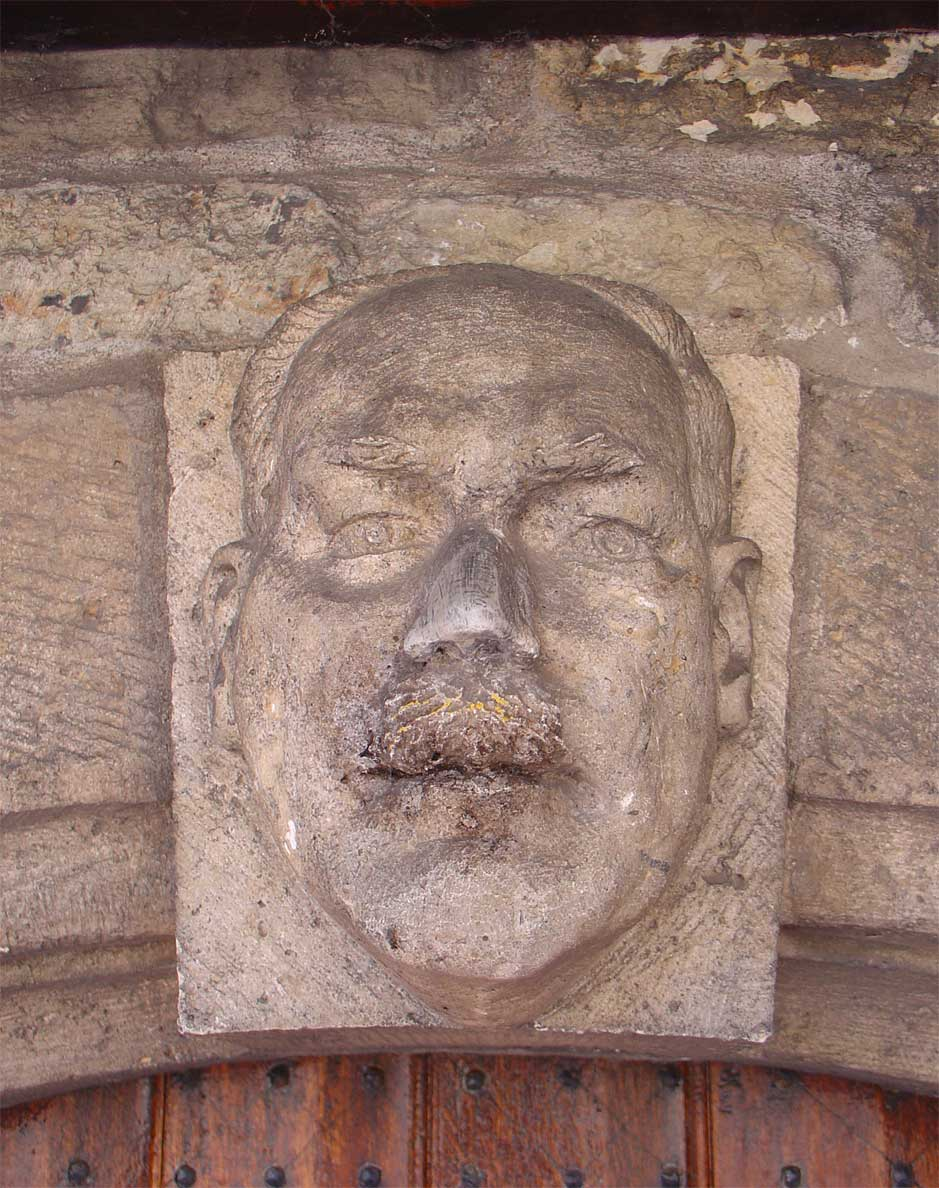
Relief of Ad van der Steur in the western wall of the city hall of Gouda

Adrianus (Ad) van der Steur (27 September 1893, Haarlem – 13 December 1953, Rotterdam) was a Dutch architect and a member of a family of architects.

== Life ==
Van der Steur studied engineering at the Technische Hogeschool Delft (Polytechnic college in Delft). After finalizing his studies in 1918 he worked for the Nederlandse Spoorwegen (Dutch Railways) and later was an architect with Gemeentewerken Rotterdam (Municipal works company Rotterdam). Like other architects in Dutch municipal and government service of that era, Van der Steur designed his buildings in the 1920s in a style similar to that of Willem Marinus Dudok and the Amsterdam School. In the early part of this period, he designed mainly schools, such as the Johan van Oldenbarnevelt HBS (1925).

After that, he designed several buildings in Rotterdam:

- Quickfilter buildings for the water company, 1929
- GEB-gebouw (municipal energy company building), 1931 with J.Poot
- Rijksseruminrichting (national vaccine institute), 1931 in Oud-Mathenesse
- Museum Boijmans van Beuningen, 1937 on private contract
- Erasmiaans Gymnasium, 1937 in Dijkzigt
- Central police bureau at Haagseveer, 1938
- Centraal Gebouw voor de Volksgezondheid (central building for public healthcare), 1938–1940 at Schiedamsedijk.
- Ventilation buildings of the Maastunnel, 1940
- Oogziekenhuis (eye hospital), 1942

Several of his designs are now listed on as a national monument in Rotterdam.

In 1941 van der Steur, together with W.A.C.Herman de Groot and K.I.Ruige, founded his own architect company.

His work was not limited to Rotterdam. He also designed the main office of IJsselmij in Zwolle (1939 - 1946); an office building for an insurance company (1951 - 1953), today the residence of the Yugoslavia Tribunaleight railway stations (1929); and one of the faculty buildings of his old school the Polytechnic University Delft (1953).

== Restorations ==
Van der Steur was as an architect not only involved in the design of new buildings, but also in the restoration of some highly visible buildings in several cities, such as the City hall of Gouda, City hall of Middelburg and the Great or Saint Laurence Church of Rotterdam.

== Family ==
Van der Steur was born into a family of architects, whose members sometimes are confused in relevant literature. His grandfather Adrianus van der Steur (1836 - 1899) was architect in Haarlem. His son and Ad's father, J.A.G. van der Steur (1865 - 1945) was a professor and architect in Delft. Besides Ad, his brother A.J. van der Steur (1895 - 1963) was architect and another brother J.A.G. van der Steur jr. was a civil engineer involved in the design of Stormvloedkering Hollandse IJssel in Krimpen aan den IJssel.

== Images ==
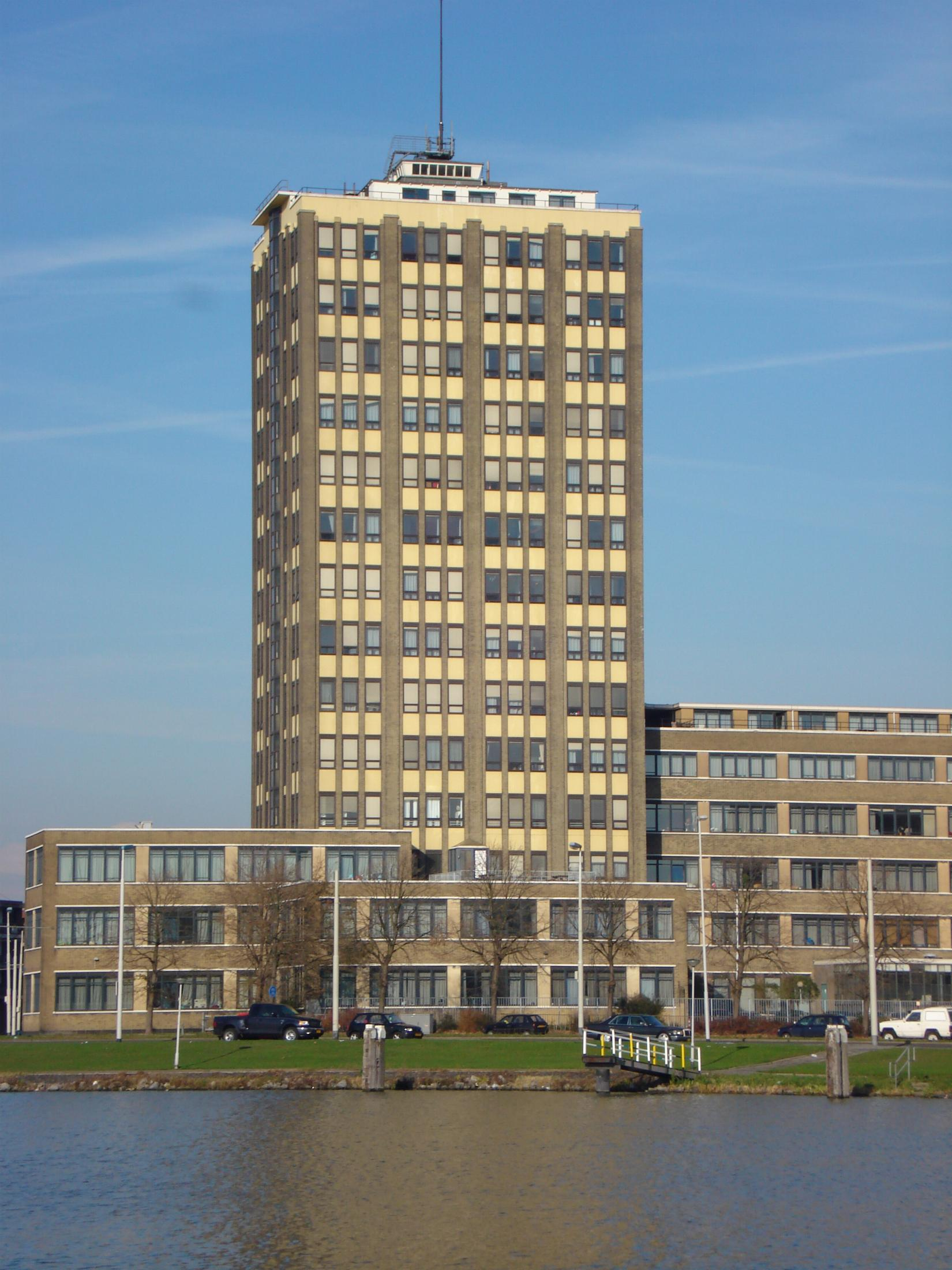
GEB-gebouw

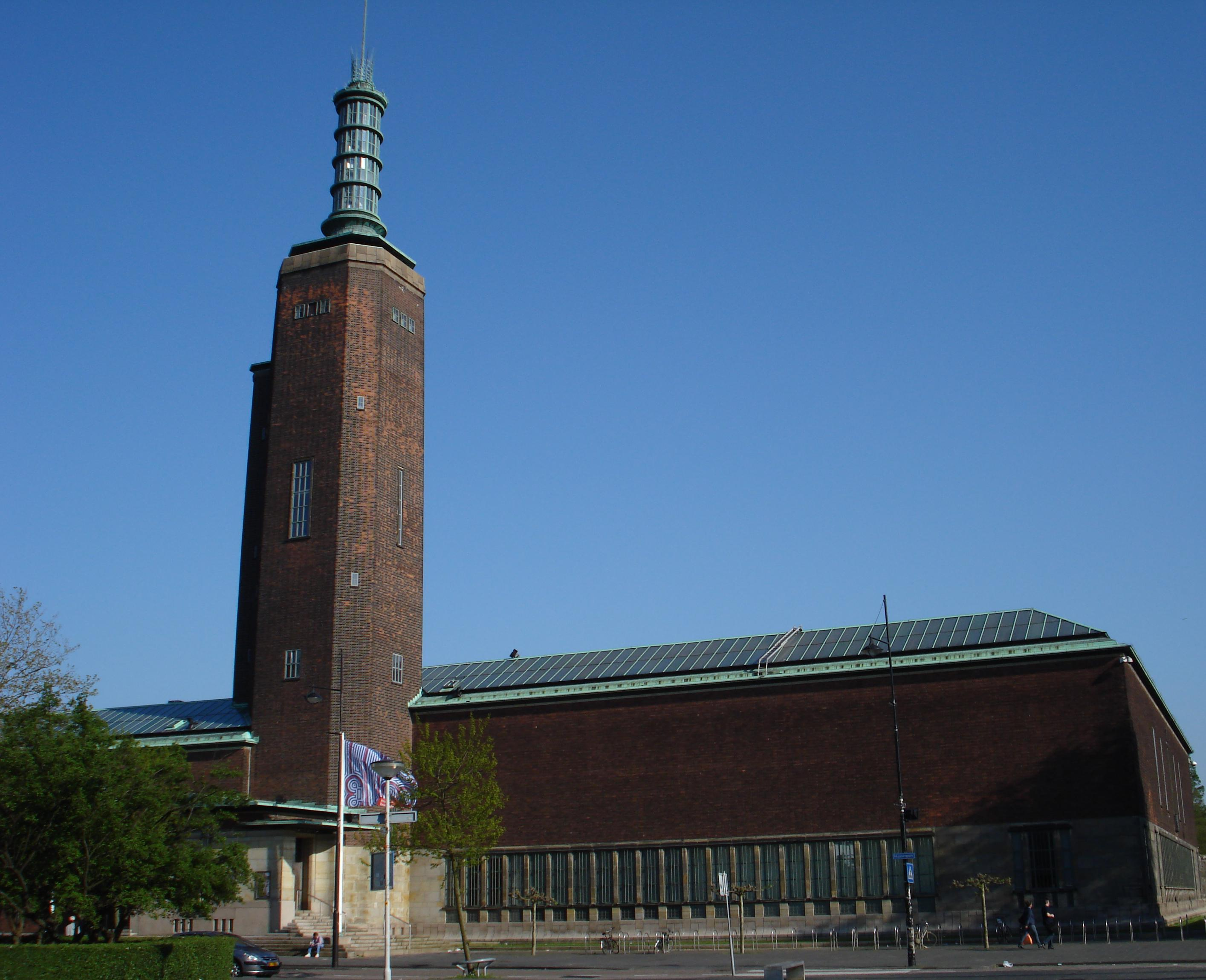
Museum Boijmans van Beuningen

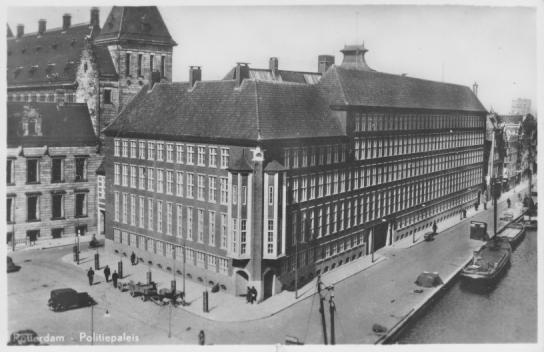
Central police bureau at Haagseveer

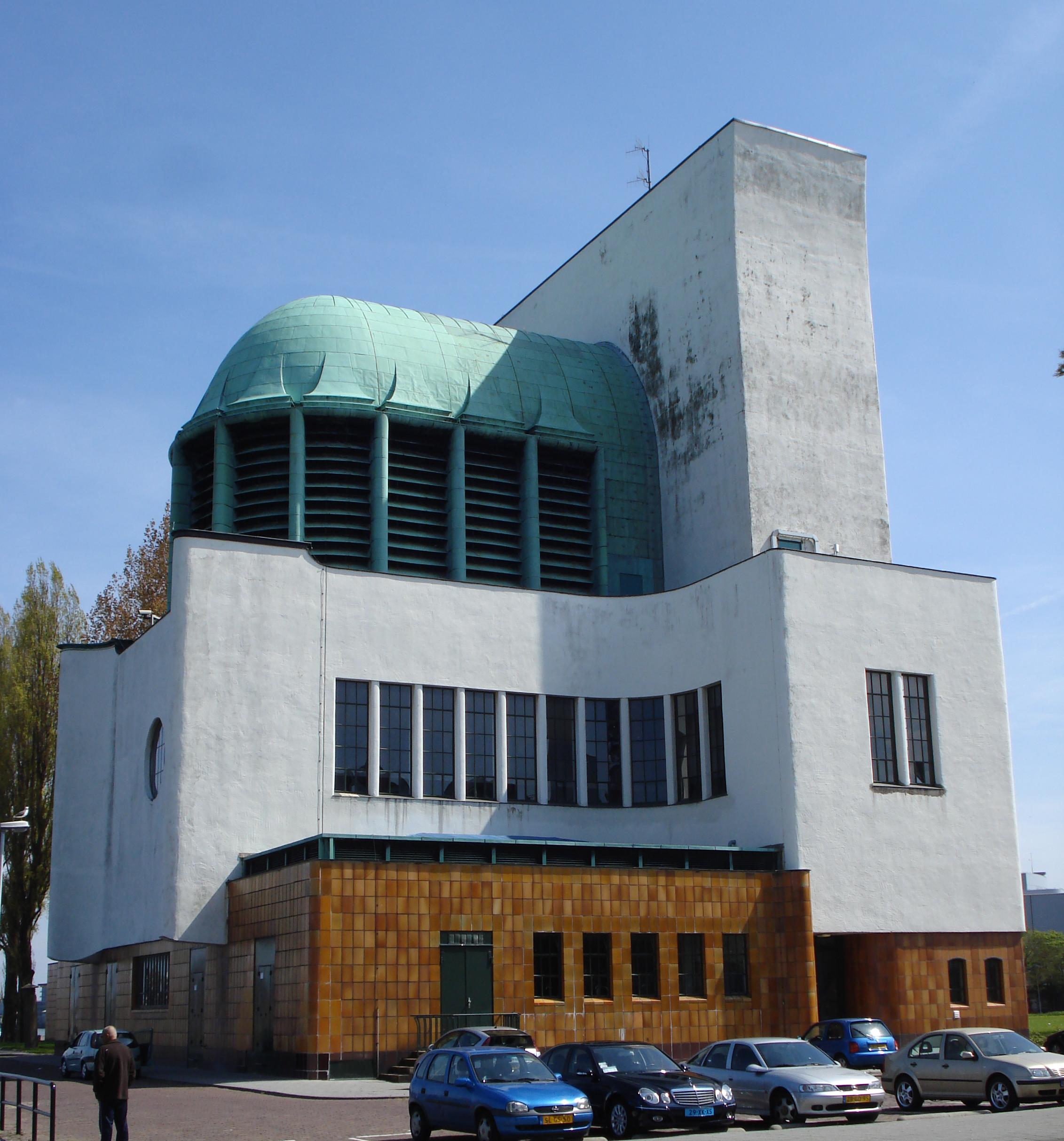
Ventilation buildings Maastunnel

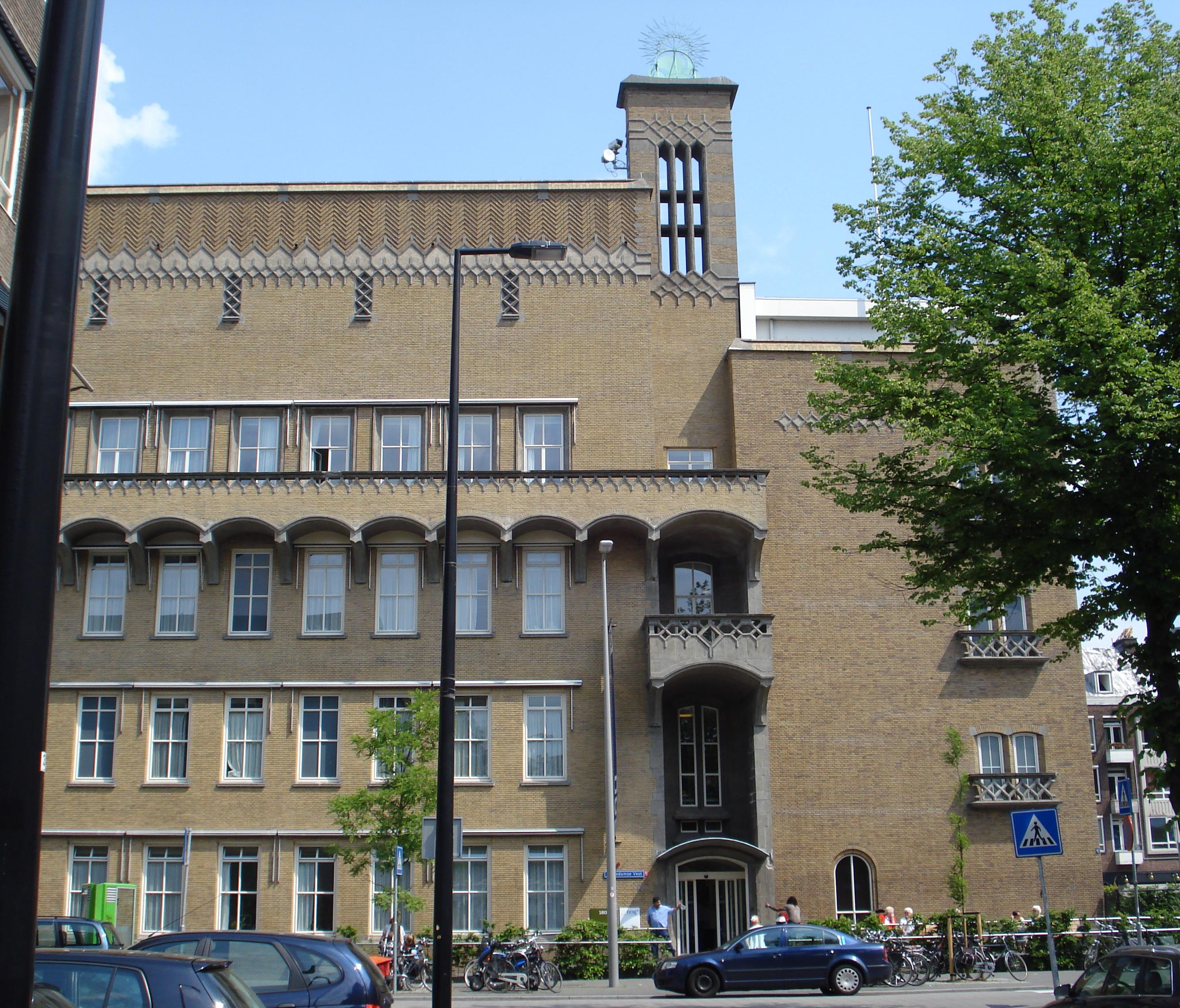
Oogziekenhuis Rotterdam

== See also ==
- List of Dutch architects

== External links and footnotes ==
- Biography in digital archive Nederlands Architectuur Instituut (Dutch)
