= Heijplaat =

Coordinates: 51°54′N 4°25′E

- Neighborhood of Rotterdam
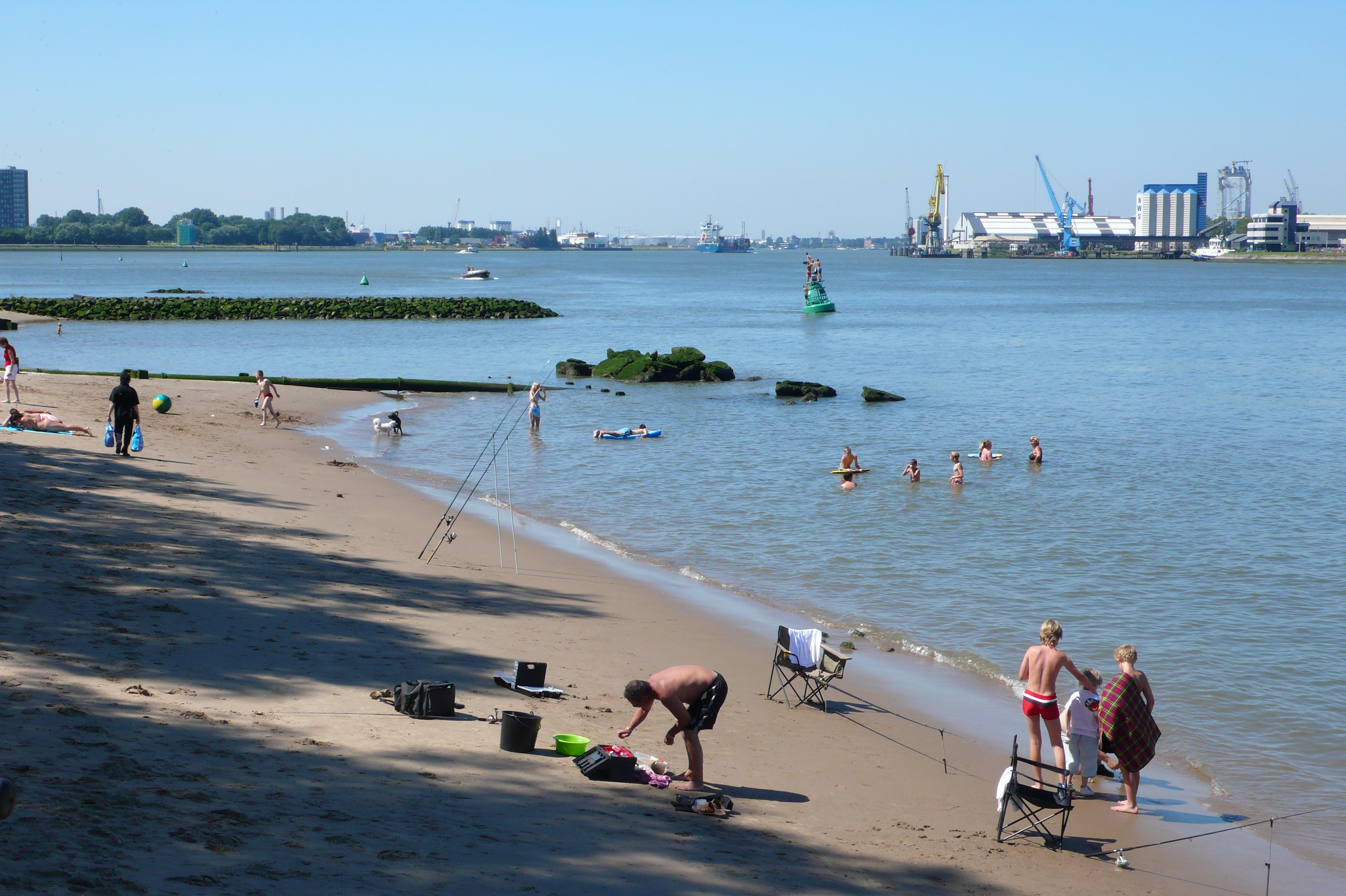
- Beach on the river Maas, Heijplaat, Rotterdam
- Interactive map of Heijplaat
- Country: Netherlands
- Province: South Holland
- COROP: Rotterdam
- Borough: Charlois
- Time zone: UTC+1 (CET)

Heijplaat is a neighborhood of Rotterdam, Netherlands.

Based on garden village design principles, the planning of the area was started in 1913 using funds from the 1902 Housing Act. The project was initiated by the Rotterdamsche Droogdok Maatschappij (Rotterdam Dry Dock Company), one of the largest shipbuilders in the country, to provide housing for skilled workers on a roughly 17 acre peninsular site between the Waalhaven and Heysehaven basins, across the River Maas from Rotterdam's centre. Its planner, Herman Ambrosius Jan Baanders (1876–1953) provided space for 400 brick houses as well as a host of community facilities that were 'all within the context of the company's moralistic paternalism'.

During the first phase of construction two churches, two schools, a community centre with shops, a library, a bath house, a firehouse, and a café and theatre located in an after work centre were constructed. A village square with a bronze fountain provided a civic focus and an archway spanning Vestastraat added an element familiar in Dutch villages, with bachelors' apartments located above and a restaurant next door. Although its density of about seventeen houses per acre was more than twice that of 't Lansink, 'the underlying town-planning principles are essentially the same', as Rg. Hofstee has observed. Later phases extended the village to the south and during the 1950s, to the southwest. Heijplaat was threatened with demolition during the 1980s, but protestors were able to win its protection.
