= Zalmplaat =

Coordinates: 51°51′N 4°22′E

- Neighborhood of Rotterdam
- Interactive map of Zalmplaat
- Country: Netherlands
- Province: South Holland
- COROP: Rotterdam
- Borough: Hoogvliet
- Established: 1956-1967
- Time zone: UTC+1 (CET)

Zalmplaat is a neighborhood of Rotterdam, Netherlands. It was established between 1956-1967 with 3,500 houses.
