= Spaanse Polder =

Coordinates: 51°55′50″N 4°25′02″E

- Neighborhood of Rotterdam
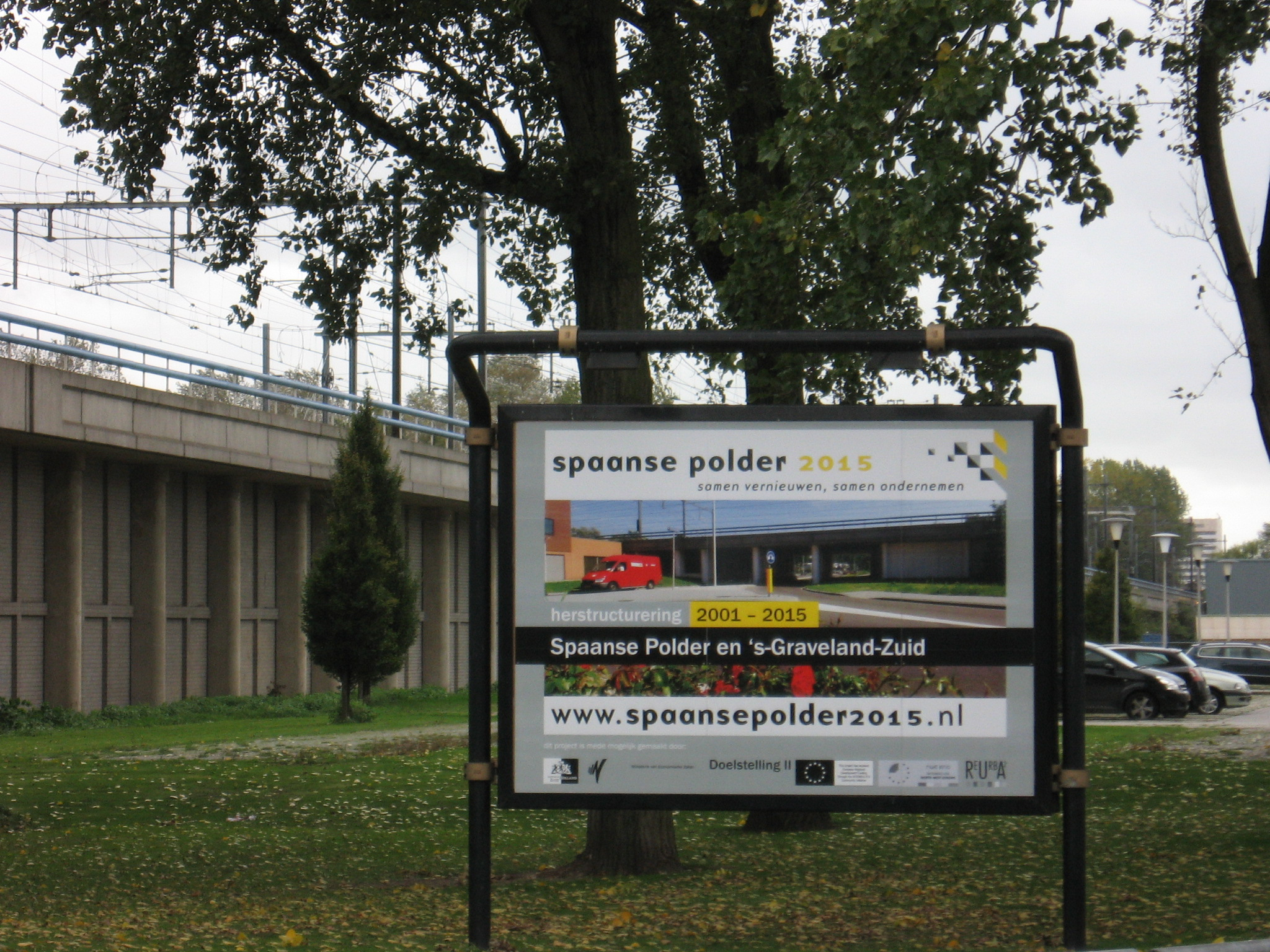
- Interactive map of Spaanse Polder
- Country: Netherlands
- Province: South Holland
- COROP: Rotterdam
- Time zone: UTC+1 (CET)

Spaanse Polder is a neighborhood of Rotterdam, Netherlands.

The neighborhood is home to an architectural monument. Department store chain Ter Meulen built a distribution centre here on the Vlaardingweg in 1967, and the business had moved there by 1969. Van den Broek en Bakema were again the architects.The city designated it a municipal monument in 2022.
