= Katendrecht =

Neighbourhood in the Netherlands

Coordinates: 51°54′N 4°29′E

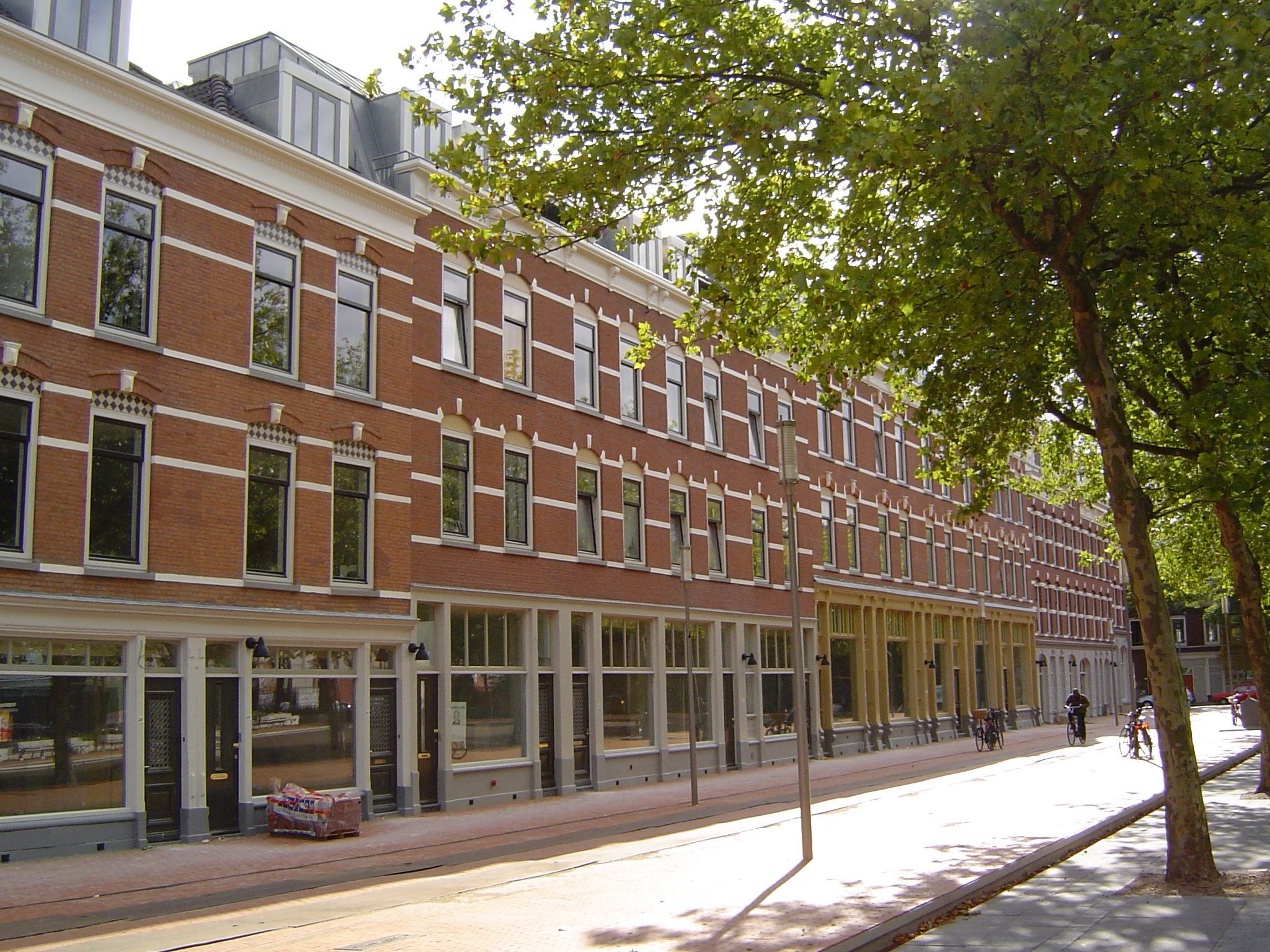
Deliplein, Katendrecht Rotterdam

Katendrecht is a neighbourhood of Rotterdam, on the south bank of the Nieuwe Maas. It is located between the Rijnhaven and the Maashaven. Katendrecht was a separate municipality from 1817 to 1874, when it merged with Charlois.

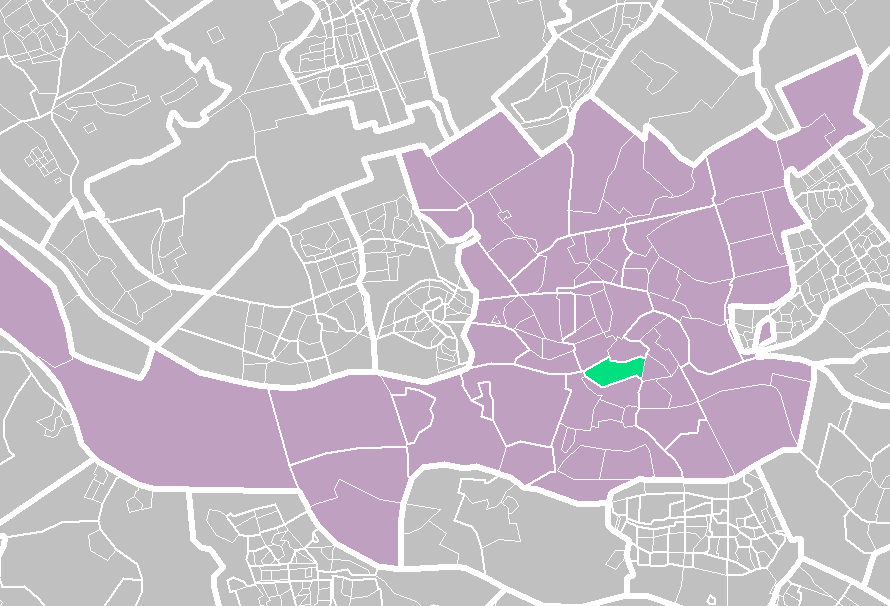

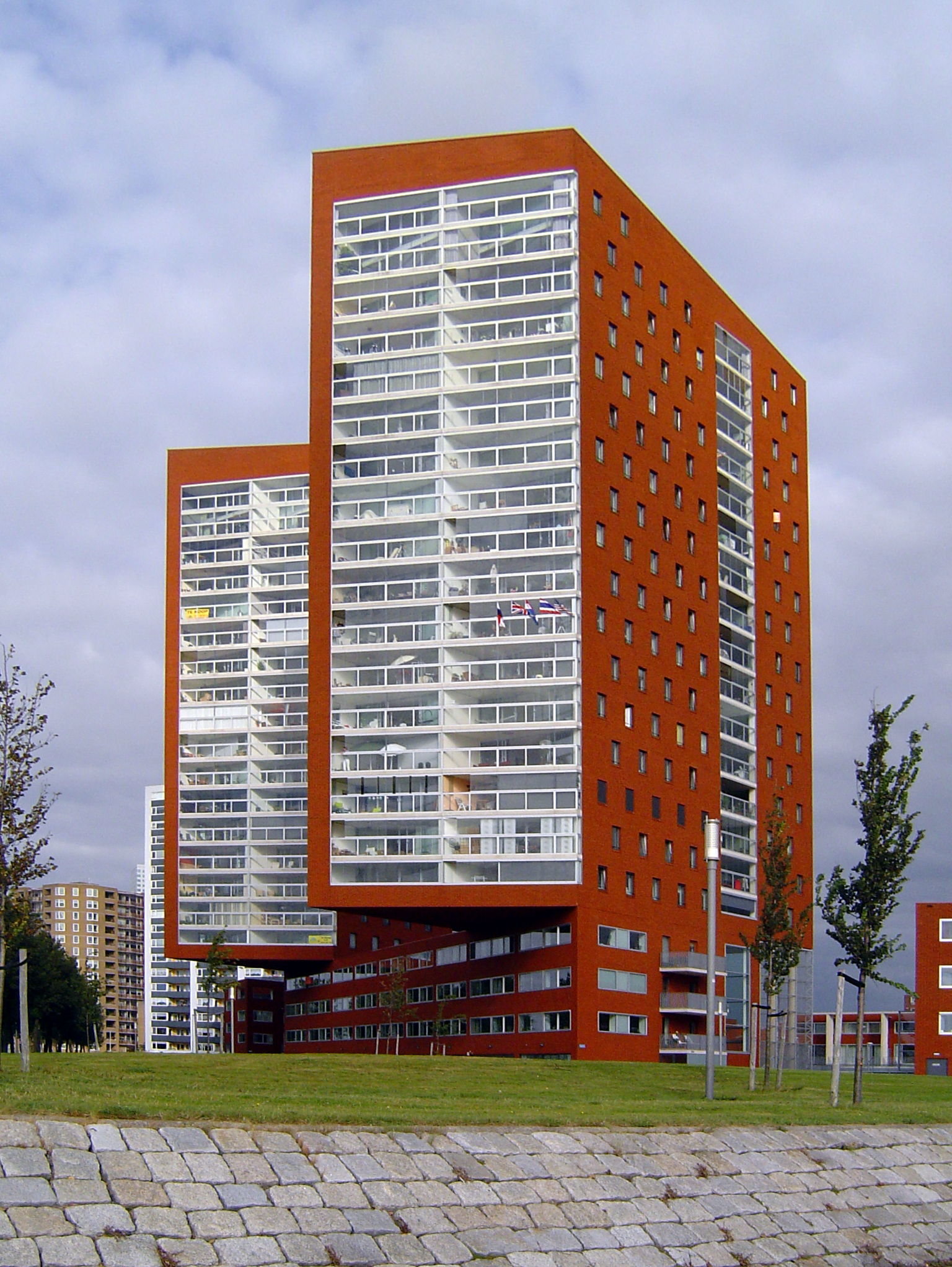
New apartment building on Katendrecht

The neighbourhood covers an area of 1,18 km² with 4,760 inhabitants. In the twentieth century it was the most well known and even famous red light district of Rotterdam, with many entertainment venues for sailors. The neighborhood's nickname is De Kaap.

== History ==
The name Katendrecht first appears as a fiefdom that belonged to the lord of Putten in the year 1199. In 1375 the Albrecht of Bavaria ordered the country to be re-dyked after the fiefdom overflowed in the two preceding years as a result of dike breaches. In 1410 Jacob van Putten, lord of Putten, gave a permit to embed a part of the floodplain. This country is later known as Jacob Potsland or Oud-Katendrecht. The part that is re-dammed after a dike breach in 1463 is referred to as Nieuw-Katendrecht or Meester Arend van der Woudensland.

From 1811 Katendrecht formed one municipality together with Charlois. From 1816 to 1874, it was an independent municipality, after which it was merged again with Charlois in 1874. In these years Katendrecht was a relatively prosperous village, surrounded by fertile polders. Part of the Rotterdam elite spent the summer months there. There was an important ferry connection to the Veerhaven on the north side of the Nieuwe Maas. In 1895 the municipality of Charlois and with it also Katendrecht was annexed by the municipality of Rotterdam. The main reason for this is that they wanted to expand the port of Rotterdam and needed space to do so. They had already started digging the Maashaven and Rijnhaven that year.

The vast majority of Katendrecht was demolished for the construction of the ports: about 700 houses, farms, some country estates and the church were demolished; about 3500 people had to leave Katendrecht. After the docks were completed in 1911, the rural village on the river was virtually destroyed; Katendrecht had become a peninsula between the Rijnhaven and Maashaven. Railway yards, sheds, silos and cheap worker's housing were located on the peninsula. In 1900 Katendrecht had a world first with the electric coal tip. This coal tip was located on the Tweede Katendrechtse Hoofd and was demolished in the 1940s. The remaining buildings became sailor's bars and so-called boarding houses - houses sailors stayed at whilst waiting for the next ship on which to work. The neighbourhood became a more and more seedy place where people gambled, fenced stolen goods and practiced prostitution.

== The Chinese ==
Before the Second World War, Katendrecht had the largest Chinese community in Europe, mainly due to shipping. Many Chinese migrants lived here in very simple boarding houses. There were also occasions where opium was used. After the Second World War, mainly Guangdonese people started the first Chinese restaurants here. In 2011, the project “China op de Kaap” commemorated on 100 years of Chinese in the Netherlands. Today, the Chinatown on Katendrecht has almost disappeared, only a few Chinese shops remain. Currently Chinatown can now be found in the center of Rotterdam. Katendrecht also used to have its own Chinese church, which was dismantled many years ago and which has recently returned.

== Renovation ==
Until well into the eighties, the district was mainly known as a red light district and Chinatown and it still has that image among many Rotterdam citizens. From 2010 onwards, Katendrecht is losing its status as a problem district. Recent renovations have transformed the neighborhood and there are still many ongoing renovation projects in the area. Old rental properties are refurbished and then sold. For two years in a row the safety index of the municipality of Rotterdam shows that Katendrecht can be seen as one of the safest neighborhoods in the city. The peninsula already features a green quay with a pedestrian promenade, a docking point for the water taxi and several works of art, including the statue of Ketelbinkie. There is a ramp which the amphibious bus can use to take a cruise on the Maas. The historic passenger steamship SS Rotterdam has been anchored on the edge of Katendrecht since August 2008, becoming a major attraction. The Provimi factory, an animal feed producer, is still located on Veerlaan, showing the industrial roots of the area. The factory complex, together with the Codrico factory, is one of the two still active port-related companies in Katendrecht.

The new bridge from Katendrecht to Hotel New York, the Rijnhaven Bridge, is popularly referred to as Hoerenloper; a reference to the former red light district. The bridge goes to Katendrecht between the Fenixloodsen on Deliplein. In the summer of 2007 there were proposals to build a cable car from the Euromast at the north shore of the river to Katendrecht, however this plan has not been implemented yet.

== Public transportation ==
- Metrostation Rijnhaven (subway lines D and E) lies at the beginning of the peninsula.
- City bus line 77 operated by RET terminates near the SS Rotterdam at the end of the Katendrecht peninsula and connects the neighborhood with the subway station and with the Zuidplein.
- Waterbus line 18, stop called “3e Katendrechtse Hoofd” is near SS Rotterdam. This line connects to the St. Jobshaven and the Erasmusbrug.
