= Nieuwe Westen =

Coordinates: 51°54′47″N 4°26′58″E

- Neighborhood of Rotterdam
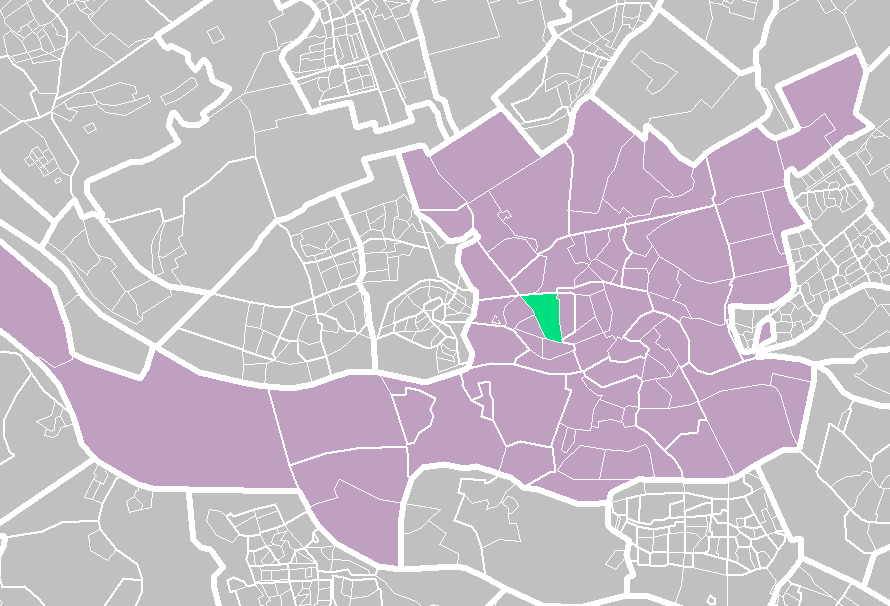
- The location of Nieuwe Westen (green) in Rotterdam
- Interactive map of Nieuwe Westen
- Country: Netherlands
- Province: South Holland
- COROP: Rotterdam
- Borough: Delfshaven
- Time zone: UTC+1 (CET)

Nieuwe Westen is a pre-war neighbourhood in the west of Rotterdam, located between the Heemraadssingel and the Delfshavense Schie in the Delfshaven district. Nieuwe Westen borders the neighbourhoods of Spangen and Middelland.

Nieuwe Westen was built around 1900 as part of an urban development plan by Gerrit de Jongh. As in the neighbouring Middelland district, Nieuwe Westen has completely renovated streets that can be found within 100 metres of the stately Heemraadssingel and Mathenesserlaan. A square in the neighbourhood is Mathenesserplein, built between 1927 and 1929 to a design by Jo van den Broek.

Over 19,500 people live in Nieuwe Westen, almost three quarters of whom have a migrant background.

The term "opzoomeren" originated in the late 1980s in the Opzoomerstraat in Nieuwe Westen and has been used by many cities elsewhere in the world.
