= Nieuw-Mathenesse =

Coordinates: 51°54′55″N 4°25′10″E

- Neighborhood of Rotterdam
- Interactive map of Nieuw-Mathenesse
- Country: Netherlands
- Province: South Holland
- COROP: Rotterdam
- Borough: Delfshaven
- Time zone: UTC+1 (CET)

Nieuw-Mathenesse is a neighborhood of Rotterdam, Netherlands.
