= Crooswijk =

Coordinates: 51°55′52″N 4°29′18″E

- Neighborhood of Rotterdam
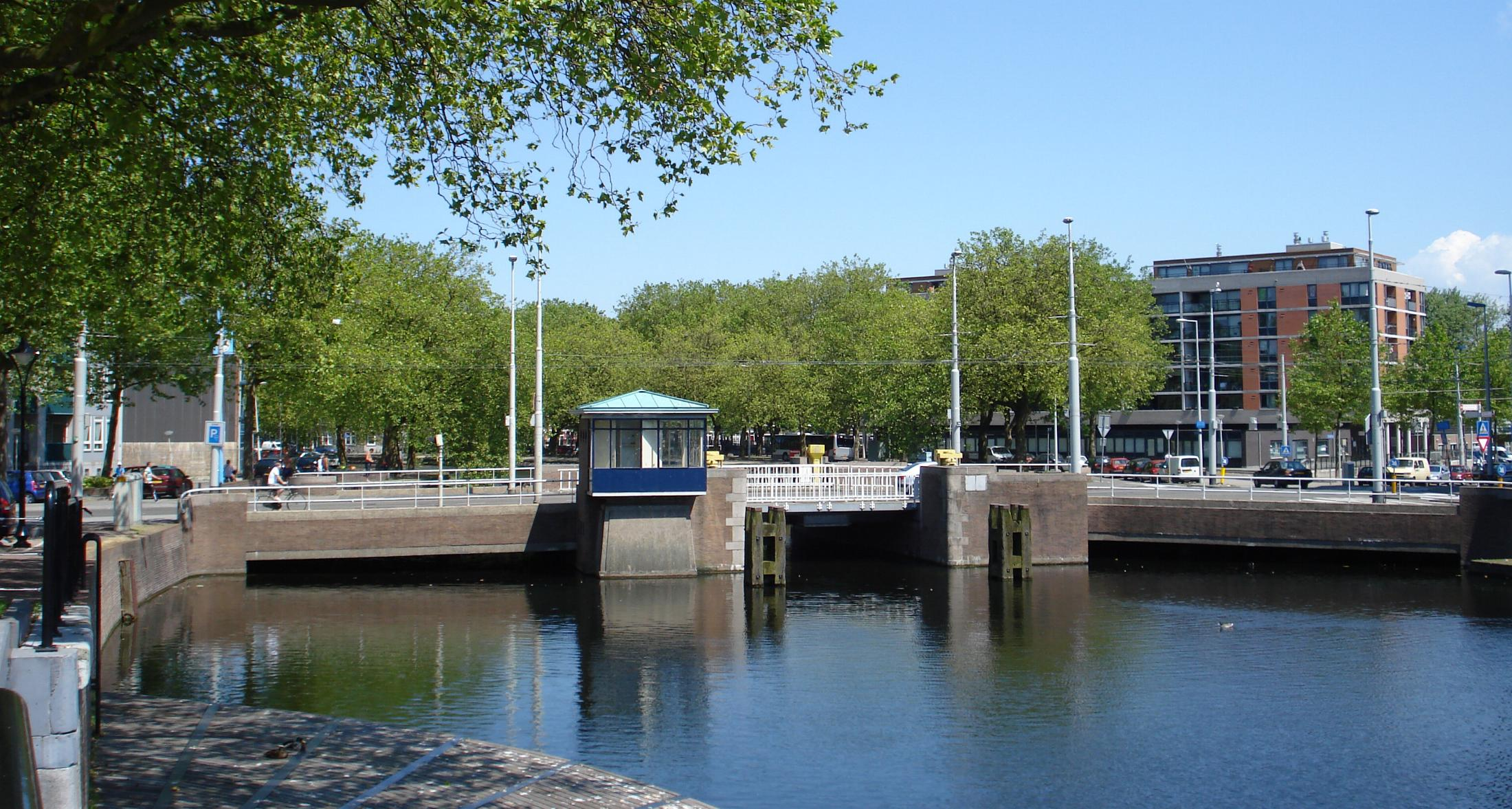
- Oude Noorden/Crooswijk. Zaagmolenbrug

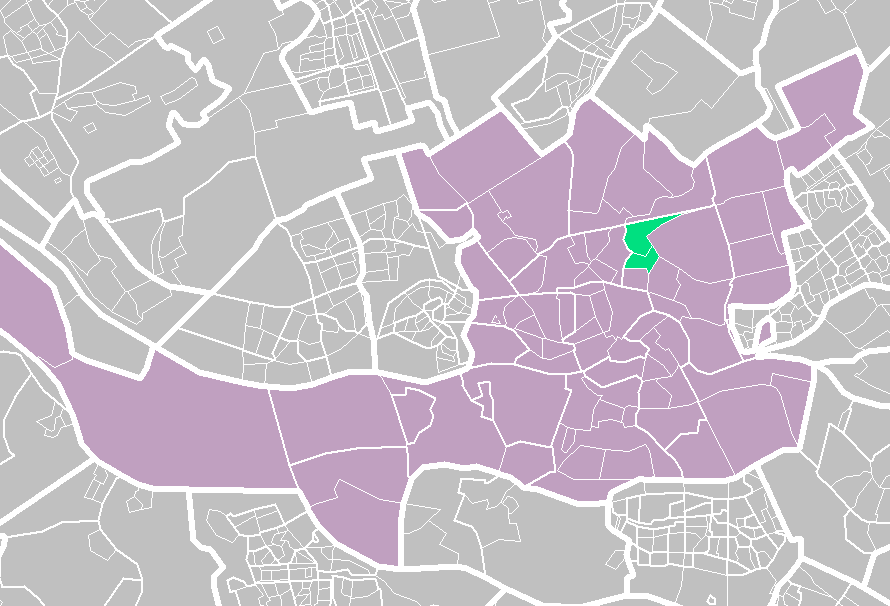
- Country: Netherlands
- Province: South Holland
- COROP: Rotterdam
- Borough: Kralingen-Crooswijk
- Time zone: UTC+1 (CET)

Crooswijk (Dutch pronunciation: [ˈkroːsʋɛik]) is a neighborhood of Rotterdam, Netherlands. Crooswijk lies between the districts Kralingen, Oude Noorden and Centrum. Crooswijk was once known for its Marines barracks. Many streets bear witness to a military history of the Marine Corps: Tamboerstraat, Pijperstraat, Schuttersveld, Excercitiestraat, Vaandrigstraat. Crooswijk also has an industrial past. Jamin, Heineken Brewery and many abattoirs were established there. These industries have given way to housing. On the Crooswijksesingel is the only monumental building of Heineken still standing. Crooswijk is one of the original people's neighborhoods of Rotterdam (unlike many other people's neighborhoods in the city, which originally were independent villages) and the district is strongly associated with the 'real' Rotterdammer. The Crooswijk is sometimes called: "The poorest part of the Netherlands", or: "The poorest part of Rotterdam". This is because the average income of the people living there is lower than other places.

Crooswijkers sought and seek their recreation at the nearby Kralingse bos.

Crooswijk has become a borough together with Kralingen. With around 52,000 inhabitants Kralingen-Crooswijk is a medium district.

== Gallery ==
Crooswijk

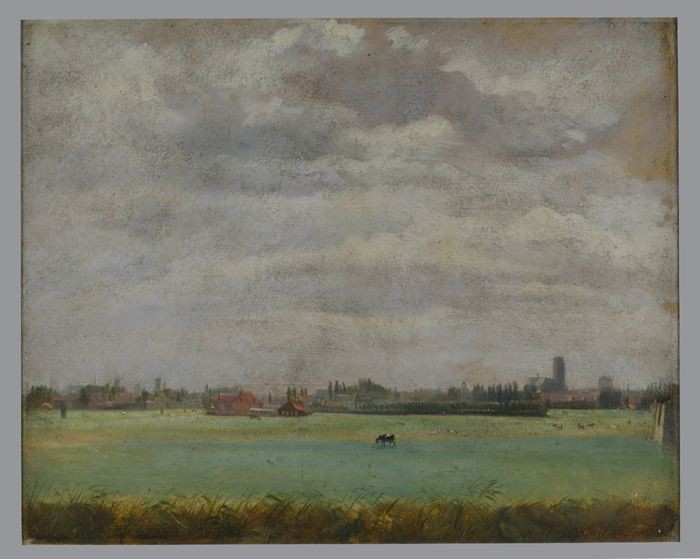
Rotterdam sight from Crooswijk (1858/1864)

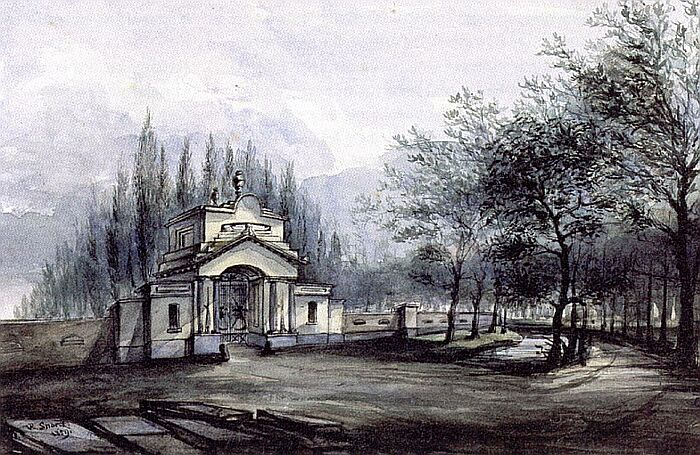
Graveyard

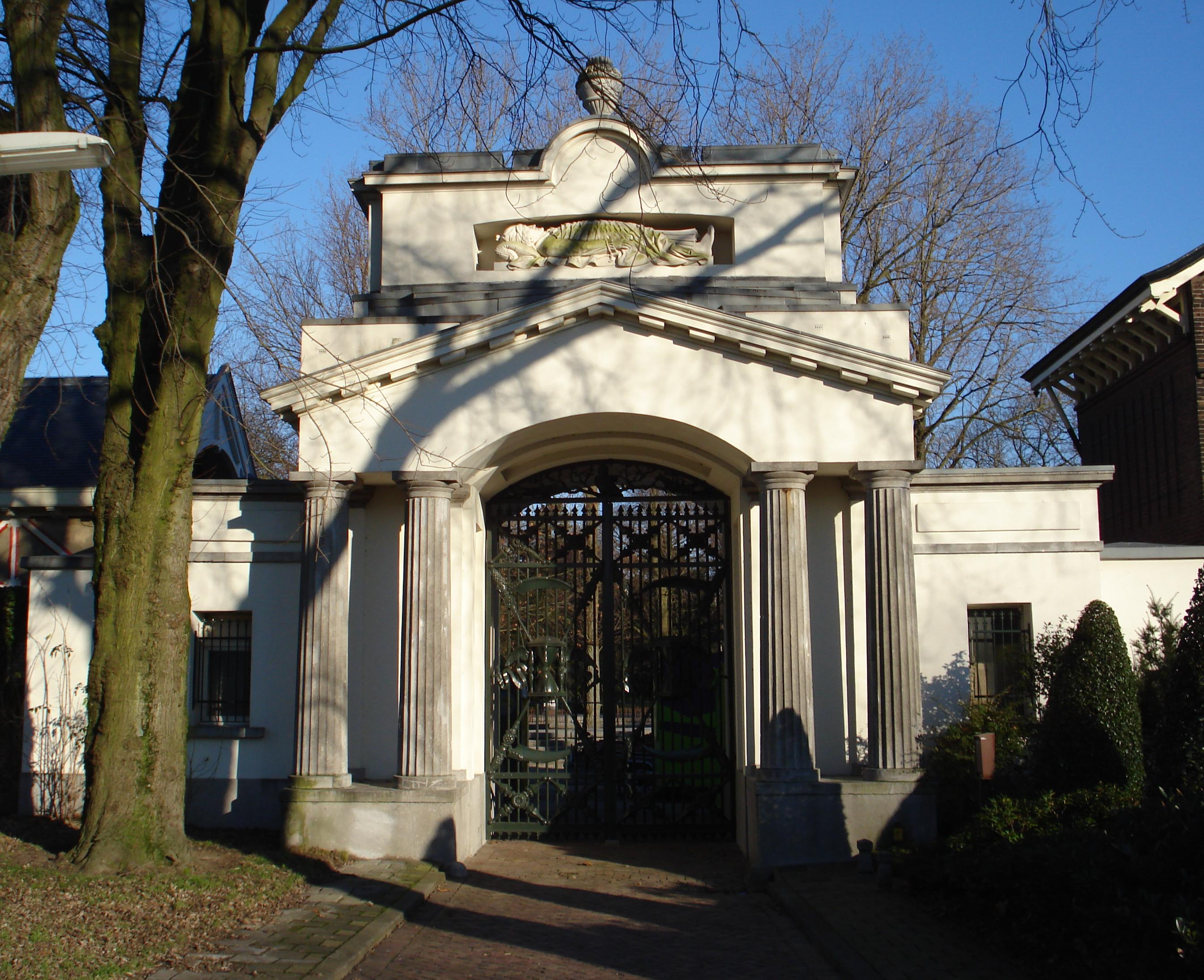
Graveyard

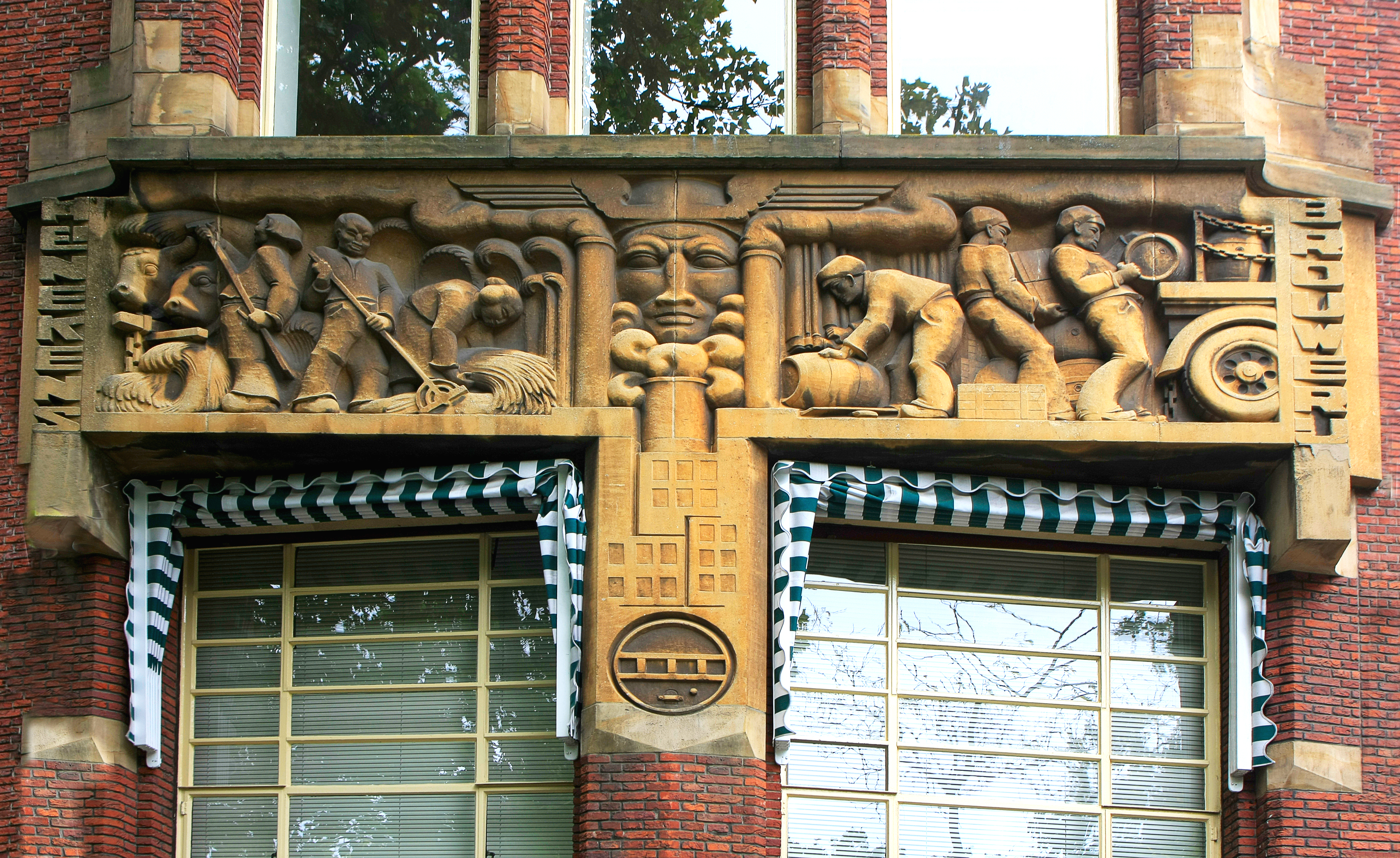
Office building brewery Heineken
