= Vondelingenplaat =

Coordinates: 51.8869°N 4.3300°E

- Neighborhood of Rotterdam
- Interactive map of Vondelingenplaat
- Country: Netherlands
- Province: South Holland
- COROP: Rotterdam
- Time zone: UTC+1 (CET)

Vondelingenplaat is a district in Rotterdam, Netherlands.
