= Oud-Mathenesse =

Coordinates: 51°55′01″N 4°25′20″E

Oud Mathenesse
- Neighborhood of Rotterdam
- Interactive map of Oud Mathenesse
- Country: Netherlands
- Province: South Holland
- COROP: Rotterdam
- Borough: Delfshaven
- Time zone: UTC+1 (CET)

Oud-Mathenesse is a neighborhood of Rotterdam, Netherlands.
