= Hoogvliet =

Coordinates: 51°52′N 4°21′E

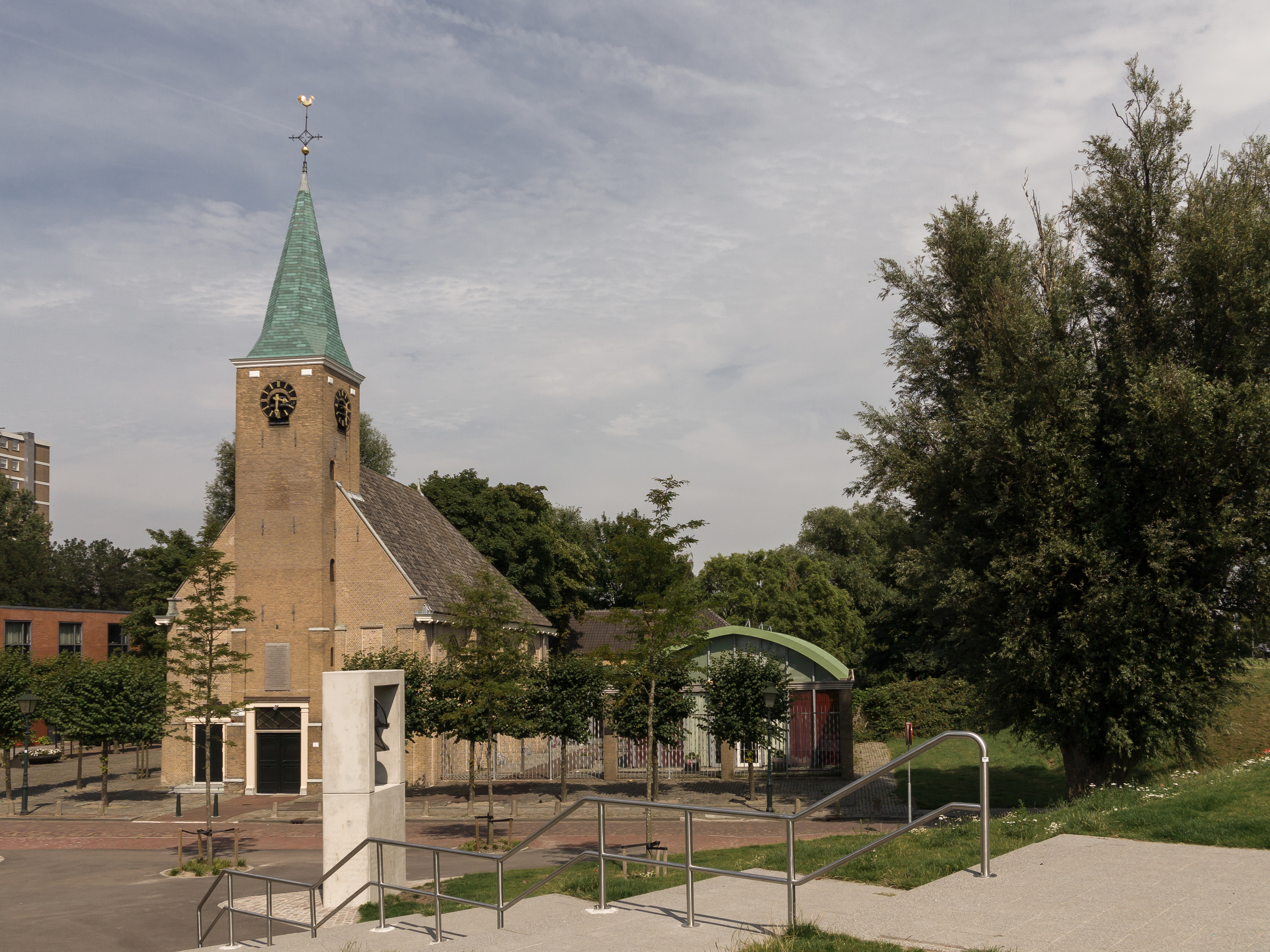

- Coat of arms

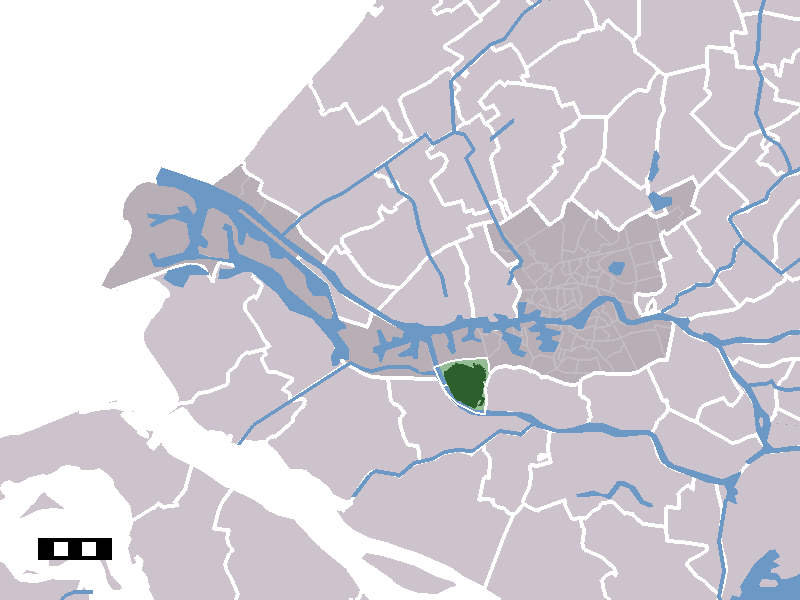
- Hoogvliet in the municipality of Rotterdam.
- Country: Netherlands
- Province: South Holland
- Municipality: Rotterdam

Area
  - Total: 10.36 km^{2} (4.00 sq mi)

Population (1 January 2023)
  - Total: 35,885
- Website: https://www.rotterdam.nl/hoogvliet

Hoogvliet (Dutch pronunciation: [ˈɦoːxflit]) is a borough of Rotterdam, Netherlands. As of 1 January 2023, it had 35,885 inhabitants. There is also a national chain of Dutch supermarkets with the same name.

== History ==
The village Hoogvliet was first mentioned on 26 May 1326 in the archive of the heren van Putten & Strijen inv. nr. 144. It used to be called Oedenvliet, Oudenvliet and Odenvliet. It was a separate municipality between 1817 and 1934, when it merged with Rotterdam.

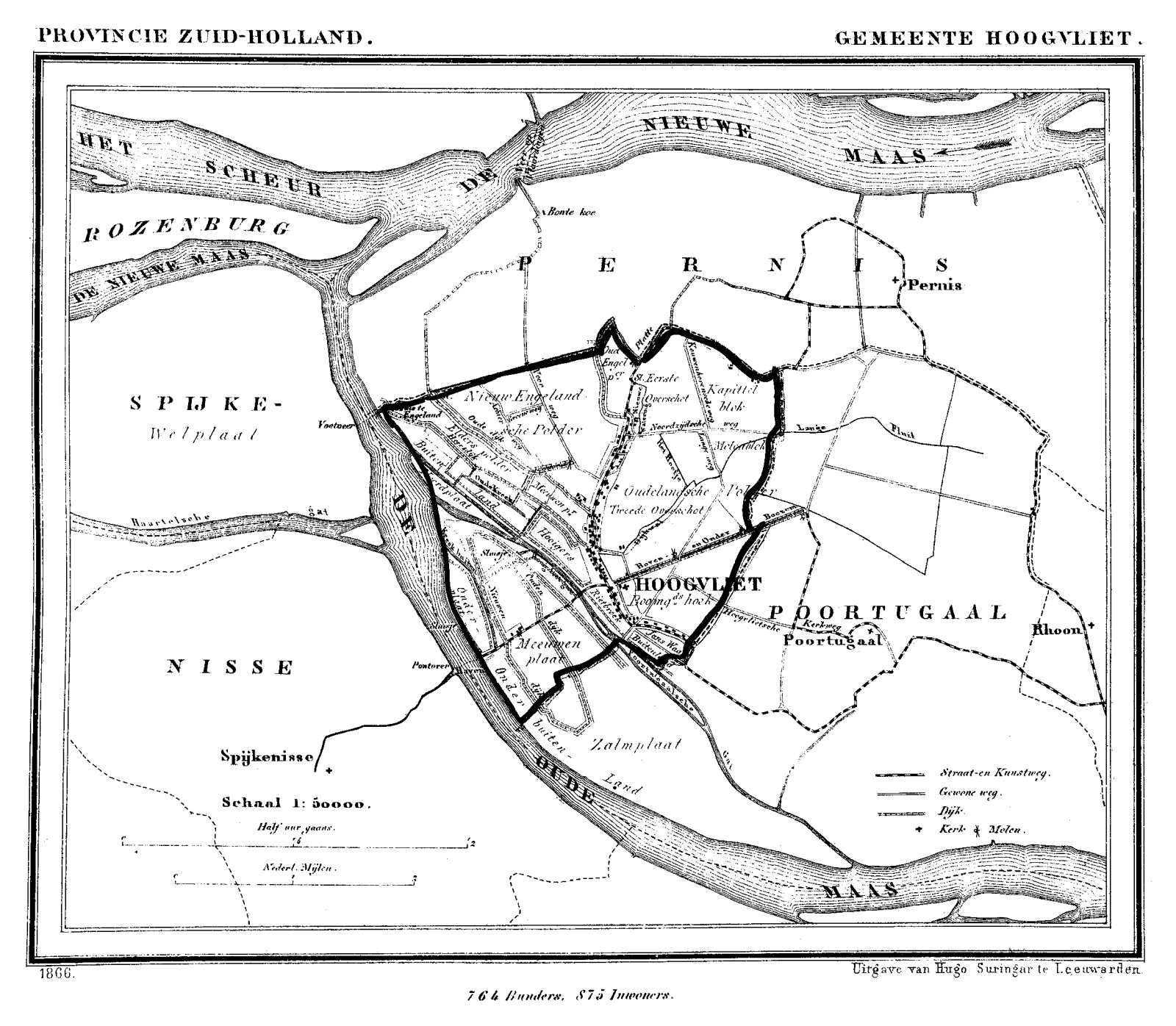
Hoogvliet in 1866.

== Districts ==
- Middengebied (the area around metrostation Hoogvliet, the Binnenban mall, an indoor swimming pool and a sports centre).
- Boomgaardshoek
- Oudeland
- Nieuw Engeland
- Tussenwater (with metrostation Tussenwater).
- Westpunt
- Zalmplaat (with metrostation Zalmplaat).
- Meeuwenplaat
- Oudewal

== Public transportation ==
Hoogvliet has a connection to the city of Rotterdam by Rotterdam Metro lines C and D, through Tussenwater, Hoogvliet, and Zalmplaat stations.

Parking places are free of charge. During rush hours and if the Spijkenisser bridge is open, the road from the freeway to Spijkenisse may be clogged.
