= Pendrecht =

Coordinates: 51°52′25″N 4°28′7″E

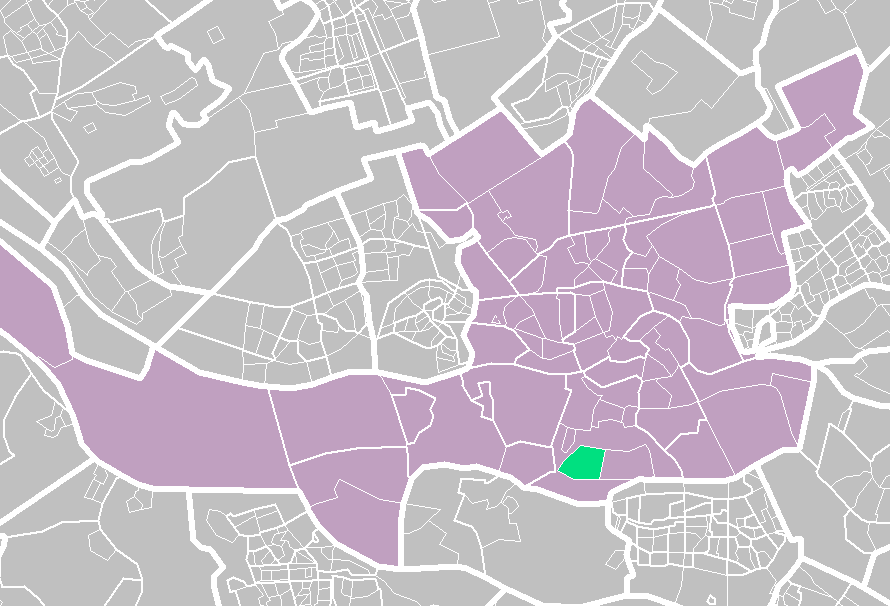
Map of Pendrecht in Rotterdam

Pendrecht is a neighborhood in Rotterdam, Netherlands.

In 2009 Eberhard van der Laan, the Minister of Housing, referred to the neighborhood as the second worst in his "40 problem neighbourhoods" list.
