= Kralingen-Crooswijk =

Coordinates: 51.93225°N 4.52062°E

- Township
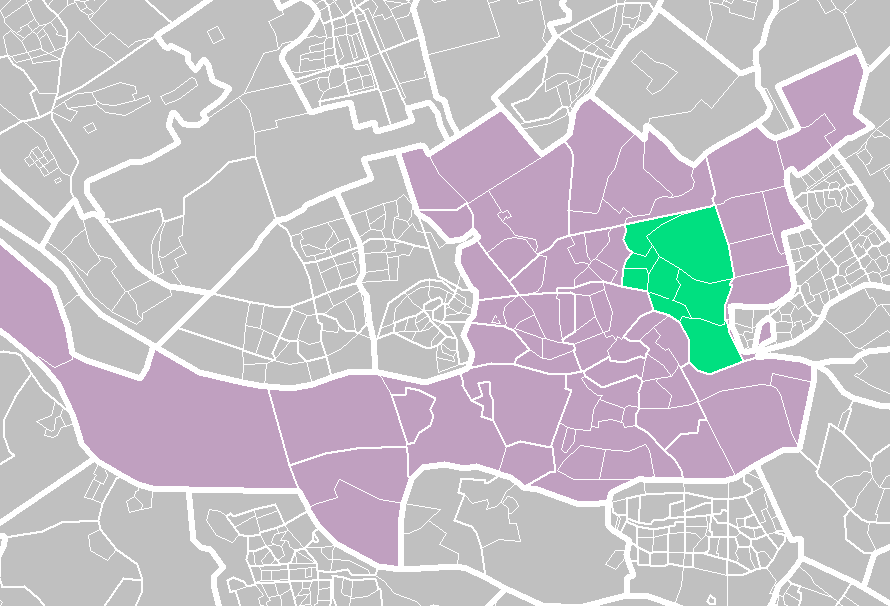
- Kralingen-Crooswijk (light green) within Rotterdam (purple).

- Location in the Netherlands
- Country: Netherlands
- Province: South Holland
- City: Rotterdam

Area
  - Total: 1,286 km^{2} (497 sq mi)

Population (2005)
  - Total: 52,379

Kralingse Bos

Kralingen-Crooswijk (Dutch pronunciation: [ˌkraːlɪŋə(ŋ) ˈkroːsʋɛik]) is a township of the city of Rotterdam, Netherlands. It is located at the immediate east of the city's centre. As of 2005 it has about 52,379 inhabitants and has a territory of about 1,286 ha. It consists of the two boroughs Kralingen and Crooswijk, the former being a village itself until it was incorporated in the city of Rotterdam in the late 19th century.

Kralingen-Crooswijk is home to the football club Excelsior Rotterdam and the economics and social studies faculties of the Erasmus University are located within its borders.

It is linked to the city centre by the Caland Metroline, as well as several Rotterdam tram and bus lines.

On the northern side of the municipality is located Het Kralingse Bos, a large park surrounding an artificial lake. Many inhabitants of the city use this park for relaxation and sport. On the eastern side the ultra modern company complex Brainpark can be found.

Originally Crooswijk and Kralingen were two different districts. Crooswijk being in the north/centre of Rotterdam and Kralingen being more on the east side.
