= Charlois =

- Neighbourhood
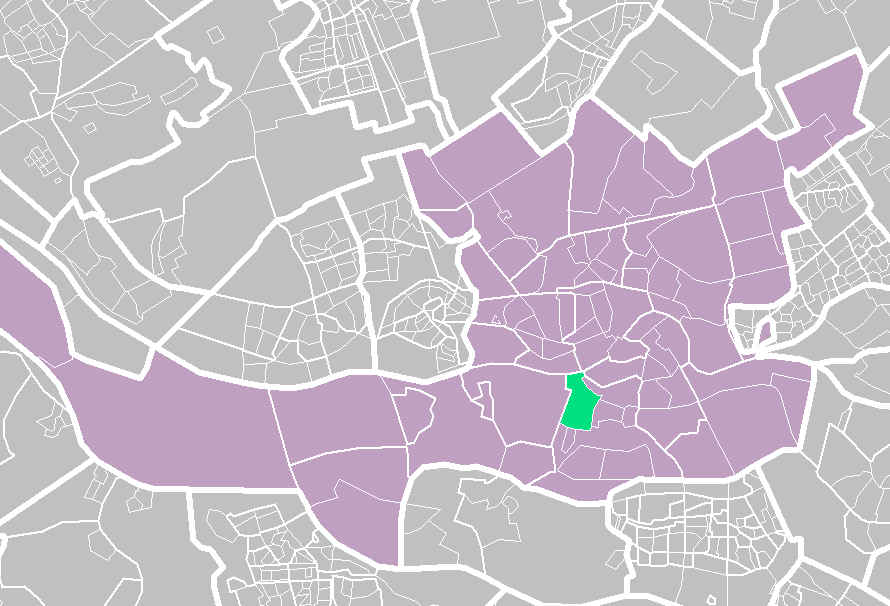
- Old Charlois (light green) within Rotterdam (purple).

- Location within the Netherlands
- Coordinates: 51°52′56″N 4°28′35″E
- Country: Netherlands
- Province: South Holland
- City: Rotterdam
- Borough: Charlois
- Incorporated into Rotterdam: 1895
- Time zone: UTC+1 (CET)

Charlois (Dutch pronunciation: [ˈɕaːrloːs]) is a neighbourhood of the Dutch city of Rotterdam. It is located on the south bank of the Nieuwe Maas.

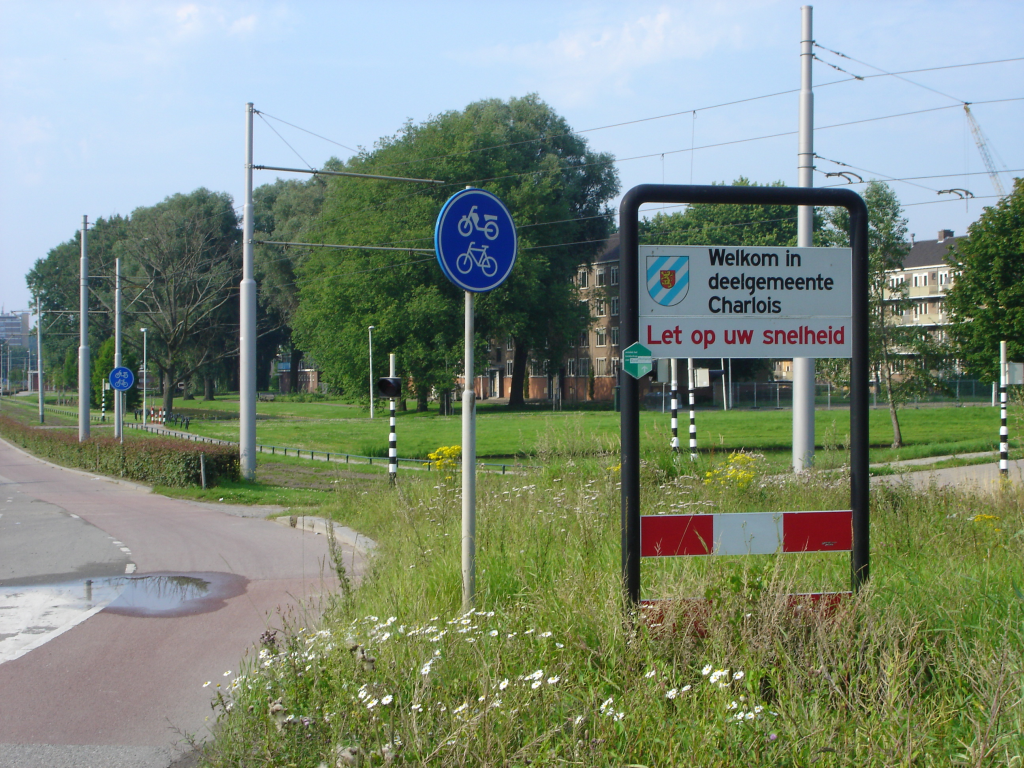
The border of the stadsdeel (borough) Charlois

Charlois used to be a separate municipality until 1895, when it became part of Rotterdam.

== History ==
Charlois used to have an airport. Waalhaven airport as it was called, was opened in 1920 as the second civilian airport in the Netherlands after Schiphol. The airport was destroyed in 1940 by the Dutch army so it could not be used by invading German Wehrmacht during World War II.

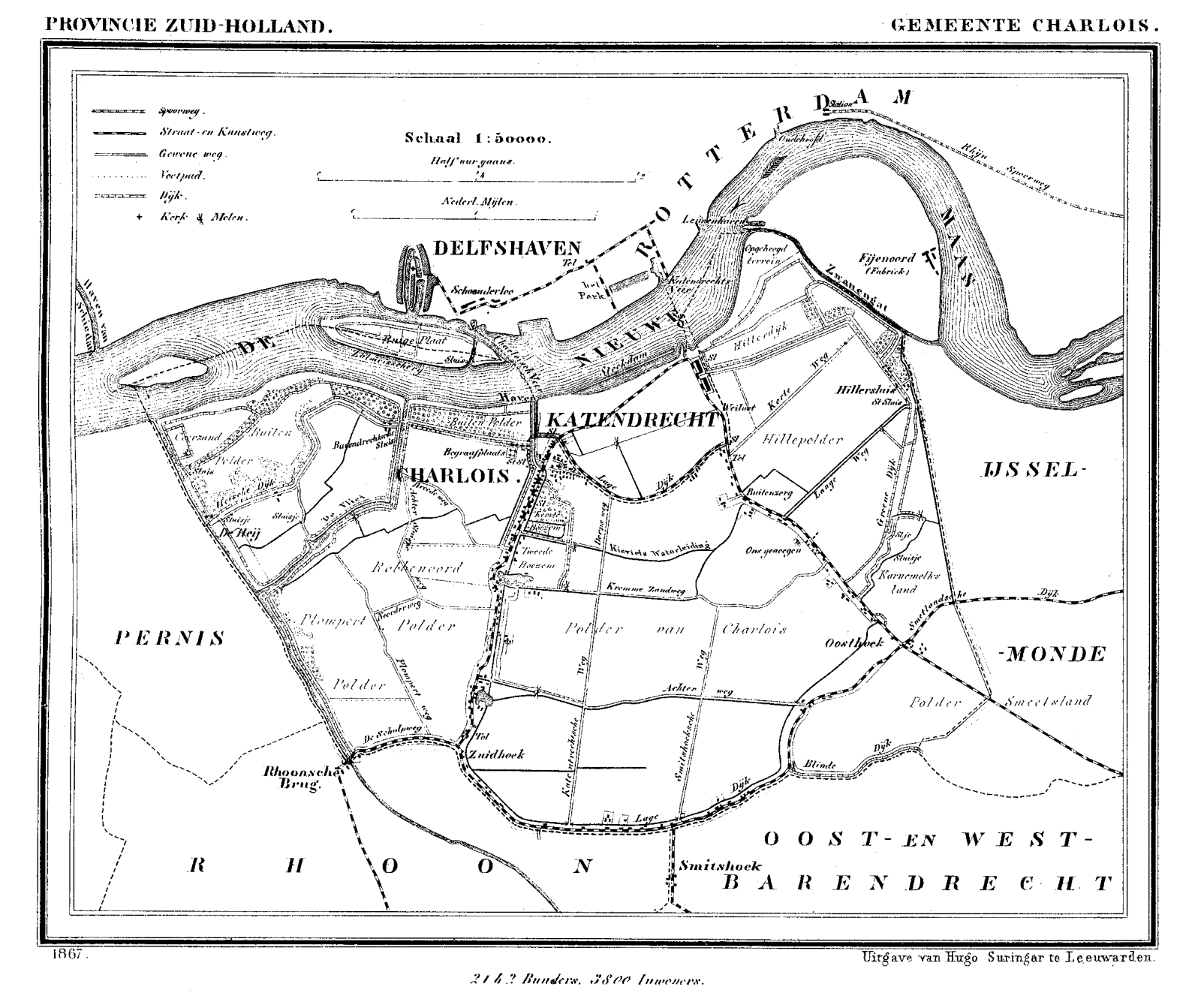
Charlois in 1867.

== Notable people ==
- Leo Beenhakker (1942-2025), former football manager of (amongst others) Real Madrid CF, AFC Ajax, Feyenoord, and Poland national football team
