= IJsselmonde, Rotterdam =

Coordinates: 51°53′1″N 4°32′45.4″E

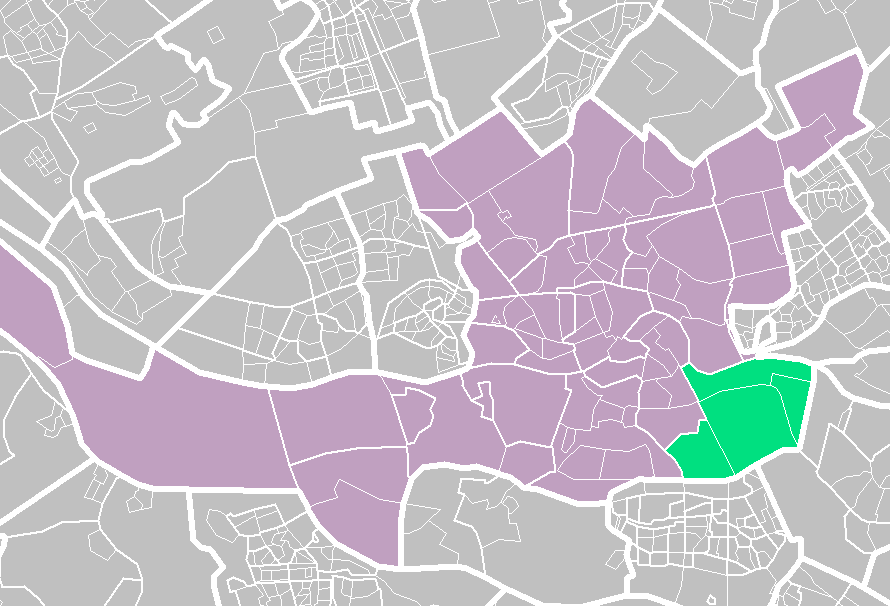
IJsselmonde (light green) within Rotterdam (purple).

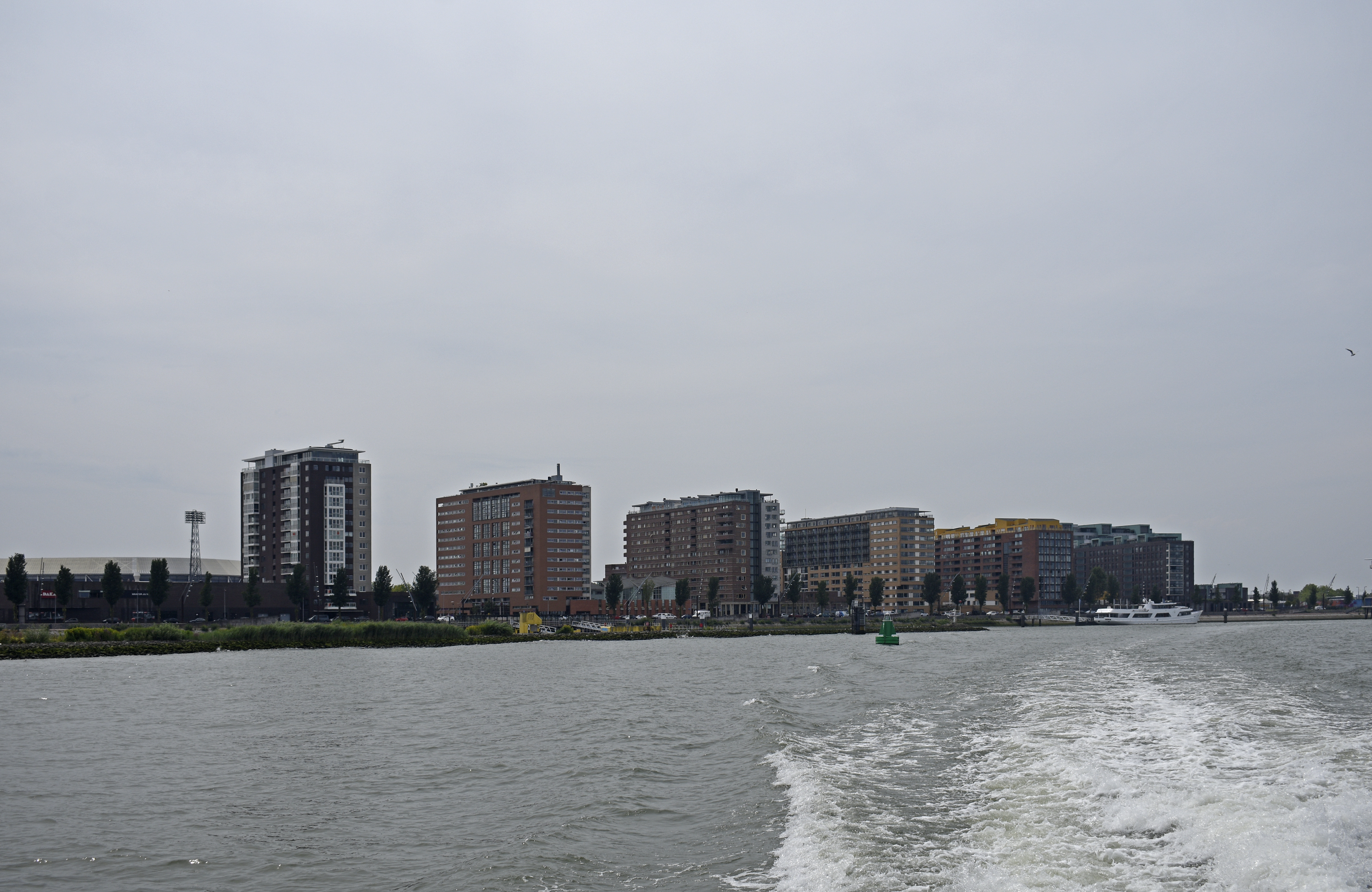
Piet Smitkade, the waterfront of IJsselmonde, seen from the Nieuwe Maas.

IJsselmonde (Dutch pronunciation: [ˌɛisəlˈmɔndə]) is a borough in the southeastern corner of the city of Rotterdam, Netherlands. As of 2023 it has 61,920 inhabitants.

The name IJsselmonde is also used to denote the island in the Rhine–Meuse–Scheldt delta bordered by the Nieuwe Maas to the north, the Oude Maas to the south, and the Noord to the east. The borough is in the island. IJssel in the name IJsselmonde refers this island's location at the mouth of the Hollandse IJssel.

== Politics ==
IJsselmonde is a stronghold of Livable Rotterdam who wins every polling station.

== Notable people ==
Comedian Paul de Leeuw was born in IJsselmonde.
