= COROP =

Statistical division of the Netherlands

Map of COROP regions of the Netherlands (2026)

A COROP region is a division of the Netherlands for statistical purposes, used by Statistics Netherlands (CBS) and the National Institute for Public Health and the Environment (RIVM), among others. The Dutch abbreviation stands for Coördinatiecommissie Regionaal Onderzoeksprogramma (Coordination Commission Regional Research Programme), the name of the commission that designed the division in 1971. There are 40 COROP regions. Two provinces, Flevoland and Utrecht, each form a single COROP region; every other COROP region lies within one province and consists of a group of municipalities. These divisions are also used in the EU designation as NUTS 3.

== Design and use ==
The division was drawn up according to the nodal principle: each COROP region has a central core, such as a city, together with its surrounding catchment area, taking existing commuting patterns into account. Because the boundaries of the COROP regions follow provincial borders, this principle is not always fully respected.

For statistics to remain comparable over time, it is important that the division is not changed too often. The COROP division has therefore barely changed since 1971, although many of the municipalities within it have since merged.

== List of municipalities by COROP region ==
=== Northern Netherlands ===
==== Groningen province ====
COROP region	Municipalities
East Groningen (Oost-Groningen)	Oldambt, Pekela, Stadskanaal, Veendam, Westerwolde
Greater Delfzijl (Delfzijl en omgeving)	Eemsdelta
Rest of Groningen (Overig Groningen)	Groningen, Het Hogeland, Midden-Groningen, Westerkwartier

==== Friesland province ====
COROP region	Municipalities
North Friesland (Noord-Friesland)	Achtkarspelen, Ameland, Dantumadiel, Harlingen, Leeuwarden, Noardeast-Fryslân, Schiermonnikoog, Terschelling, Tietjerksteradeel, Vlieland, Waadhoeke
South West Friesland (Zuidwest-Friesland)	De Fryske Marren, Súdwest-Fryslân
South East Friesland (Zuidoost-Friesland)	Heerenveen, Ooststellingwerf, Opsterland, Smallingerland, Weststellingwerf

==== Drenthe province ====
COROP region	Municipalities
North Drenthe (Noord-Drenthe)	Aa en Hunze, Assen, Midden-Drenthe, Noordenveld, Tynaarlo
South West Drenthe (Zuidwest-Drenthe)	Hoogeveen, Meppel, Westerveld, De Wolden
South East Drenthe (Zuidoost-Drenthe)	Borger-Odoorn, Coevorden, Emmen

=== Eastern Netherlands ===
==== Overijssel province ====
COROP region	Municipalities
North Overijssel (Noord-Overijssel)	Dalfsen, Hardenberg, Kampen, Ommen, Staphorst, Steenwijkerland, Zwartewaterland, Zwolle
South West Overijssel (Zuidwest-Overijssel)	Deventer, Olst-Wijhe, Raalte
Twente	Almelo, Borne, Dinkelland, Enschede, Haaksbergen, Hellendoorn, Hengelo, Hof van Twente, Losser, Oldenzaal, Rijssen-Holten, Tubbergen, Twenterand, Wierden

==== Gelderland province ====
COROP region	Municipalities
Veluwe	Apeldoorn, Barneveld, Ede, Elburg, Epe, Ermelo, Harderwijk, Hattem, Heerde, Nijkerk, Nunspeet, Oldebroek, Putten, Scherpenzeel, Voorst, Wageningen
South West Gelderland (Zuidwest-Gelderland)	Buren, Culemborg, Maasdriel, Neder-Betuwe, Tiel, West Betuwe, West Maas en Waal, Zaltbommel
Achterhoek	Aalten, Berkelland, Bronckhorst, Brummen, Doetinchem, Lochem, Montferland, Oost Gelre, Oude IJsselstreek, Winterswijk, Zutphen
Arnhem & Nijmegen	Arnhem, Berg en Dal, Beuningen, Doesburg, Druten, Duiven, Heumen, Lingewaard, Nijmegen, Overbetuwe, Renkum, Rheden, Rozendaal, Westervoort, Wijchen, Zevenaar

==== Flevoland province ====
COROP region	Municipalities
Flevoland	Almere, Dronten, Lelystad, Noordoostpolder, Urk, Zeewolde

=== Western Netherlands ===
==== Utrecht province ====
COROP region	Municipalities
Utrecht	Amersfoort, Baarn, De Bilt, Bunnik, Bunschoten, Eemnes, Houten, IJsselstein, Leusden, Lopik, Montfoort, Nieuwegein, Oudewater, Renswoude, Rhenen, De Ronde Venen, Soest, Stichtse Vecht, Utrecht, Utrechtse Heuvelrug, Veenendaal, Vijfheerenlanden, Wijk bij Duurstede, Woerden, Woudenberg, Zeist

==== North Holland province ====
COROP region	Municipalities
Kop van North Holland (Kop van Noord-Holland)	Den Helder, Drechterland, Enkhuizen, Hollands Kroon, Hoorn, Koggenland, Medemblik, Opmeer, Schagen, Stede Broec, Texel
Alkmaar agglomeration (Alkmaar en omgeving)	Alkmaar, Bergen, Dijk en Waard, Heiloo
IJmond	Beverwijk, Castricum, Heemskerk, Uitgeest, Velsen
Haarlem agglomeration (Agglomeratie Haarlem)	Bloemendaal, Haarlem, Heemstede, Zandvoort
Zaanstreek	Wormerland, Zaanstad
Greater Amsterdam (Groot-Amsterdam)	Aalsmeer, Amstelveen, Amsterdam, Diemen, Edam-Volendam, Haarlemmermeer, Landsmeer, Oostzaan, Ouder-Amstel, Purmerend, Uithoorn, Waterland
Het Gooi & Vechtstreek	Blaricum, Gooise Meren, Hilversum, Huizen, Laren, Weesp, Wijdemeren

==== South Holland province ====
COROP region	Municipalities
Leiden & Bollenstreek	Hillegom, Kaag en Braassem, Katwijk, Leiden, Leiderdorp, Lisse, Noordwijk, Oegstgeest, Teylingen, Voorschoten, Zoeterwoude
Greater The Hague (Agglomeratie 's-Gravenhage)	The Hague, Leidschendam-Voorburg, Pijnacker-Nootdorp, Rijswijk, Wassenaar, Zoetermeer
Delft & Westland	Delft, Midden-Delfland, Westland
East South Holland (Oost-Zuid-Holland)	Alphen aan den Rijn, Bodegraven-Reeuwijk, Gouda, Krimpenerwaard, Nieuwkoop, Waddinxveen
Greater Rijnmond	Albrandswaard, Barendrecht, Brielle, Capelle aan den IJssel, Goeree-Overflakkee, Hellevoetsluis, Hoeksche Waard, Krimpen aan den IJssel, Lansingerland, Maassluis, Nissewaard, Ridderkerk, Rotterdam, Schiedam, Vlaardingen, Westvoorne, Zuidplas
South East South Holland (Zuidoost-Zuid-Holland)	Alblasserdam, Dordrecht, Gorinchem, Hardinxveld-Giessendam, Hendrik-Ido-Ambacht, Molenlanden, Papendrecht, Sliedrecht, Zwijndrecht

==== Zeeland province ====
COROP region	Municipalities
Zeelandic Flanders (Zeeuws-Vlaanderen)	Hulst, Sluis, Terneuzen
Rest of Zeeland (Overig Zeeland)	Borsele, Goes, Kapelle, Middelburg, Noord-Beveland, Reimerswaal, Schouwen-Duiveland, Tholen, Veere, Vlissingen

=== Southern Netherlands ===
==== North Brabant province ====
COROP region	Municipalities
West North Brabant (West-Noord-Brabant)	Bergen op Zoom, Breda, Drimmelen, Etten-Leur, Geertruidenberg, Halderberge, Moerdijk, Oosterhout, Roosendaal, Rucphen, Steenbergen, Woensdrecht, Zundert
Mid North Brabant (Midden-Noord-Brabant)	Alphen-Chaam, Altena, Baarle-Nassau, Dongen, Gilze en Rijen, Goirle, Hilvarenbeek, Loon op Zand, Oisterwijk, Tilburg, Waalwijk
North East North Brabant (Noordoost-Noord-Brabant)	Bernheze, Boekel, Boxtel, 's-Hertogenbosch, Heusden, Land van Cuijk, Maashorst, Meierijstad, Oss, Sint-Michielsgestel, Vught
South East North Brabant (Zuidoost-Noord-Brabant)	Asten, Bergeijk, Best, Bladel, Cranendonck, Deurne, Eersel, Eindhoven, Geldrop-Mierlo, Gemert-Bakel, Heeze-Leende, Helmond, Laarbeek, Nuenen, Gerwen en Nederwetten, Oirschot, Reusel-De Mierden, Someren, Son en Breugel, Valkenswaard, Veldhoven, Waalre

==== Limburg province ====
COROP region	Municipalities
North Limburg (Noord-Limburg)	Beesel, Bergen, Gennep, Horst aan de Maas, Mook en Middelaar, Peel en Maas, Venlo, Venray
Mid Limburg (Midden-Limburg)	Echt-Susteren, Leudal, Maasgouw, Nederweert, Roerdalen, Roermond, Weert
South Limburg (Zuid-Limburg)	Beek, Beekdaelen, Brunssum, Eijsden-Margraten, Gulpen-Wittem, Heerlen, Kerkrade, Landgraaf, Maastricht, Meerssen, Simpelveld, Sittard-Geleen, Stein, Vaals, Valkenburg aan de Geul, Voerendaal

== See also ==
- Indeling van Nederland in 40 COROP-gebieden per 01-01-2017 (kaart), website CBS
- COROP-indeling per 01-01-2012 (kaart), website CBS
- COROP-indeling per 01-01-2012 (tekst), website CBS
