= Battle of Rotterdam =

1940 German attempt to capture Rotterdam

- Part of the Battle of the Netherlands
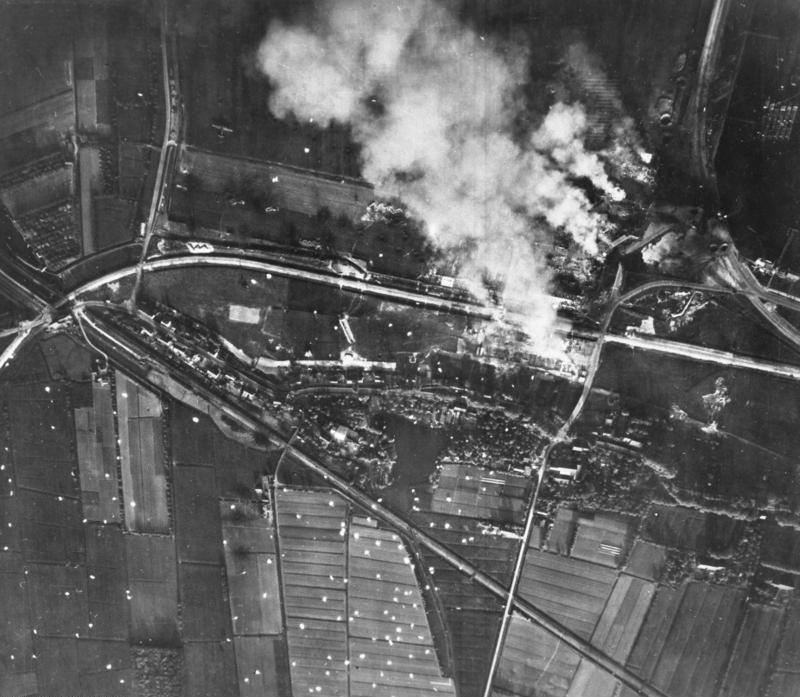
- Waalhaven – the airbase near Rotterdam burning during the German attack
Date	10–14 May 1940
Location	Rotterdam, Netherlands, and the surrounding area 51°55′51″N 4°28′45″E
Result	German victory

Belligerents
Netherlands; United Kingdom	Germany

Commanders and leaders
(Netherlands) P. W. Scharroo (United Kingdom) Clifford Brazier	(Nazi Germany) Kurt Student (WIA)

Strength
7,000 soldiers 12 artillery pieces 6 anti-tank guns 2 armoured cars 1 gunboat 1 motor torpedo boat 1 demolition team UK	1,000 soldiers 12 float planes

Casualties and losses
185 killed 1 armoured car damaged 3 aircraft destroyed 1 motor torpedo boat damaged	123 killed 5 aircraft destroyed

The Battle of Rotterdam was a Second World War battle fought during the Battle of the Netherlands. Fought between 10 and 14 May 1940, it was a German attempt to seize the Dutch city. It ended in a German victory, following the Rotterdam Blitz.

== Prelude ==
Rotterdam had no prepared defences and had not been included in any strategic defence plan. It was relatively far from the boundaries of Fortress Holland and some distance from the coast. The troops stationed in Rotterdam belonged to training establishments and some smaller miscellaneous units. A modern artillery battalion with twelve 105 mm (4.1 in) guns (10.5 cm Cannon Model 1927) was located in Hillegersberg. Its guns had a range of over 16,000 m (17,000 yd), sufficient for almost anywhere around Rotterdam. The garrison commander was a military engineer, Colonel P. W. Scharroo. The garrison consisted of about 7,000 men; only 1,000 had a combat function (Marines, 39RI). Around the Nieuwe Maas seven platoons of light anti-aircraft artillery (AAA) were deployed; they were equipped with heavy machine guns (Vickers machine gun or MG 08) and Oerlikon 20 mm cannons and Scottis. One battery of heavy AAA was stationed north of the Nieuwe Maas. There were also two more batteries of heavy AAA and four AAA platoons in the Waalhaven area. The Waalhaven Airbase was also the home of the "3rd Java" squadron of the Royal Netherlands Air Force equipped with Fokker G.I heavy fighters. Eleven operational G.Is, fully armed and fueled, were stationed at Waalhaven on 10 May. During the bombing of the airfield, nine of these managed to take off and attack the German bombers resulting in the loss of 167 Luftwaffe's Junkers Ju 52s, scoring up to 14 claimed aerial kills.

The original German plan called for a task force from Waalhaven to attack the town and seize the bridges over the Nieuwe Maas using the advantage of surprise. When the plans were evaluated, it was decided that the chances of the taskforce being able to achieve success were rated below the acceptable level, so the Germans devised a new plan. Twelve specially adapted floatplanes—Heinkel He 59Ds—would land on the Nieuwe Maas with two platoons of the 11th Company of the 16th Air Landing Regiment, plus four engineers and a three-man company troop. These 90 men would seize the bridges. They would be reinforced by a 36-man platoon of airborne soldiers (3rd platoon 11./Fjr1). They were scheduled to land at the Feyenoord football stadium, close to the Nieuwe Maas. Subsequently, units from Waalhaven would be sent in with additional support weapons.

== The landing ==
In the early morning hours of 10 May, 12 Heinkel He 59 seaplanes landed on the Nieuwe Maas. Rubber dinghies were launched. Each could carry six soldiers and their equipment; about 80 German soldiers landed on both banks of the river and an island. The Germans quickly seized some of the bridges, which were not guarded. The only resistance they met was from some Dutch policemen.

Oberstleutnant Dietrich von Choltitz, the commander of the 3rd Battalion of the 16th Air Landing Regiment, began to organise his troops after landing them at Waalhaven Air Force Base. He sent them to the bridges in Rotterdam. The Dutch had not stationed many soldiers in the southern part of the city. One unit was made up of butchers, bakers and about 90 infantrymen, the latter being reinforced by riflemen who had withdrawn from the airfield. The Dutch troops hid in houses that were on the route to the bridges. There they ambushed the approaching German troops. Both sides suffered casualties. The Germans managed to bring up a PaK anti-tank gun. The Dutch had to yield under the ever-increasing pressure. The German force then moved on to the bridges, quickly followed by the bulk of 9th Company of the 16th Air Landing Regiment.

Meanwhile, the staff of 3rd Battalion of the 16th Air Landing Regiment had run into the Dutch in the square. Oberstleutnant von Choltitz's adjutant took charge of an assault on the Dutch position but was mortally wounded in the process. When the Germans looked for another route to the bridges to bypass the Dutch stronghold, they managed to find a wedge that advance troops had created along the quays. It was at about 09:00 when the bulk of the 3rd Battalion made contact with the defenders of the bridges.

The Dutch company in the south of the city was able to stand its ground until well into the afternoon of 10 May. It was then assaulted by the newly landed 10th Company of the 16th Air Landing Regiment, assisted by mortars. The Dutch surrendered when they ran out of ammunition.

== The battle ==
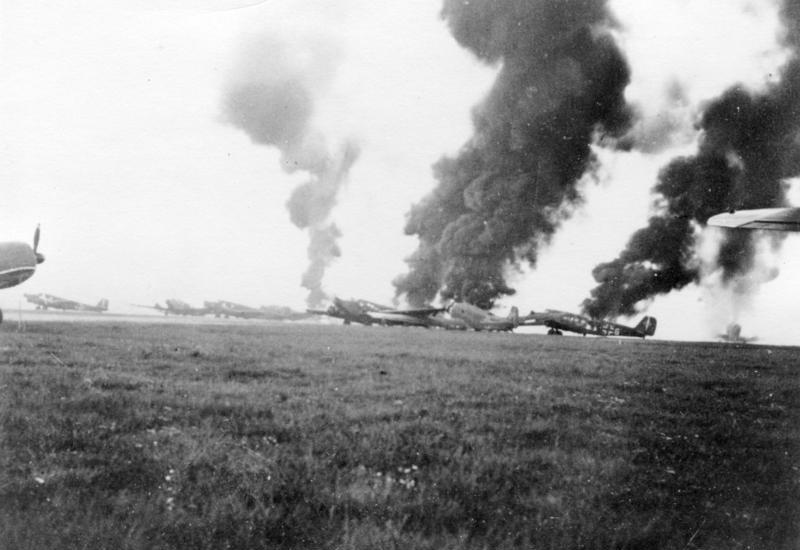
Junkers Ju 52 transport aircraft burning at Rotterdam

=== 10 May ===
Military situation around Rotterdam on 10 May 1940

The Dutch troops in the north of town were alerted by the roaring of planes overhead. The garrison headquarters were temporarily manned by only a captain, who had the troops assemble and coordinated the distribution of ammunition. Many small detachments were sent out to the bridges, the three railway stations nearby, and areas around the Nieuwe Maas where landings had been reported. The Germans noticed the activity on the Dutch side and the first contacts with the Dutch forced them to consolidate their forces around the bridges.

The first Dutch countermeasures were executed by a small delegation of Dutch Marines and an incomplete army engineers company. The Dutch took positions around the small German pocket north of the bridges and started deploying machine guns at numerous strategic points. Soon, the first serious fire exchanges between the invaders and regular Dutch army units were seen and heard. Gradually, the Germans were pushed back to the confines of the narrow perimeter around the traffic bridge. Both sides suffered considerable losses.

Gradually, the Dutch forced the German troops at the bridgehead into a quickly shrinking pocket. Many civilians watched the battle. Halfway through the morning, the Dutch Navy assigned two small navy vessels—a small obsolete gunboat and a motor torpedo boat (Z 5 and TM51)—to assist the defenders at the bridges. Twice, the gunboat attacked the Germans at the traffic bridge on the north side of the Noordereiland (an island in the river), the second time accompanied by the motor torpedo boat. About 75 shells of 75 mm (2.95 in) were unleashed on the invaders, but with little effect. During the second attempt, the Luftwaffe dropped a number of bombs on the navy ships that caused substantial damage to the motor torpedo boat. Both ships retired after the bomb attack. They had suffered three men killed in action.

Meanwhile, the Germans had been reinforced with a number of 37 mm (1.46 in) PaK 36 anti-tank guns and a few infantry guns (7.5 cm leichtes Infanteriegeschütz 18). They manned the houses along the north side of the island with heavy machine gun (MG 34 in Lafette 34 tripod) crews and placed a few 80 mm (3.15 in) mortars (8 cm Granatwerfer 34) in the center of the island. The continuous battle for the northern river bank caused the Germans to withdraw to the large National Life Insurance Company building, at the head of the traffic bridge. Due to the bad firing angles, the Dutch had on the building, the Germans were able to hold the building without much difficulty. Dutch troops occupying nearby houses were forced to fall back, due to accurate and sustained mortar fire. That stalemate—commencing in the afternoon of 10 May—would remain unchanged until the surrender of the Netherlands on 14 May.

Colonel Scharroo—aware that his small garrison was dealing with a serious German attack—had requested substantial reinforcements in The Hague. Many reinforcements would be sent, all coming from the reserves behind the Grebbe line or from the eastern front of the Fortress Holland.

=== 11 May ===
During the night and into the early morning, the garrison commander Scharroo received reinforcements from the northern sector of Fortress Holland. Colonel Scharroo reorganised his defences. He deployed troops along the entire river and to the west, north and east of the city. The latter was done because the Colonel feared actions from landed Germans against the city from these directions. His small staff was very much occupied with the numerous reports about phantom landings and treacherous civilian actions. These activities occupied the staff to such an extent that no plans for organised counter-measures against the German bridgehead were drawn up for 11 May.

At 04:00, the fighting resumed around the bridgehead. The German spearhead was still formed by their occupation (about 40 to 50 men) of the National Life Insurance building north of the traffic bridge. This building and its occupation had become isolated from the balance of the German forces by Dutch progress on 10 May. All Dutch attempts to seize the building failed, but so did all German attempts to resupply or reinforce the occupants. Germans that tried to reach the building by crossing the bridge by motorbike or car were either shot or forced back. The bridge had become a no-go area, dominated by machine guns from both sides.

The Royal Netherlands Air Force assisted the ground forces upon request from Scharroo. Dutch bombers began dropping bombs on the bridges, and although all of them missed, stray bombs did hit German positions near the bridge, taking out a number of machine gun nests. Another raid followed, but the Luftwaffe responded by means of 12 Messerschmitt Bf 110s patrolling the skies overhead. The Dutch bombers attacked the bridges but were immediately jumped on by the German fighters. The Germans lost five planes compared to three Dutch losses, but to the small Dutch air force that was a heavy toll.

The Germans used the Holland America Line ship SS Statendam for positioning some of their machine guns. These positions attracted Dutch attention; soon, mortar and machine gun fire was aimed at the German positions on the ship and the adjacent installations. Many fires broke out and the ship itself caught fire as well. The Germans quickly evacuated the vessel that would continue to burn until well after the capitulation on 14 May.

=== 12 May ===
On 12 May, fighting continued where it had ended the previous day. Although the Dutch did not regain control of the city, the Germans were suffering from continuous assaults on their positions. Casualties mounted up on both sides and the German command grew increasingly worried over the status of their 500 men in the heart of Rotterdam. Oberstleutnant von Choltitz was allowed by Generalleutnant Kurt Student to withdraw his men from the northern pocket should he consider the operational situation required it.

To the northwest of Rotterdam, at the village of Overschie, forces that had been involved in the air landings at Ockenburg and Ypenburg assembled. General Graf von Sponeck had moved the remainder of his force from Ockenburg to Overschie, negotiating between Dutch forces in the area. In the village of Wateringen, the Germans bumped into a guard squad of a Dutch command post and when two armoured cars appeared to support the Dutch defenders, the Germans backed off and took a detour. The majority of von Sponeck's group succeeded in reaching the village Overschie, where they joined up with German survivors of the Ypenburg battle.

=== 13 May ===
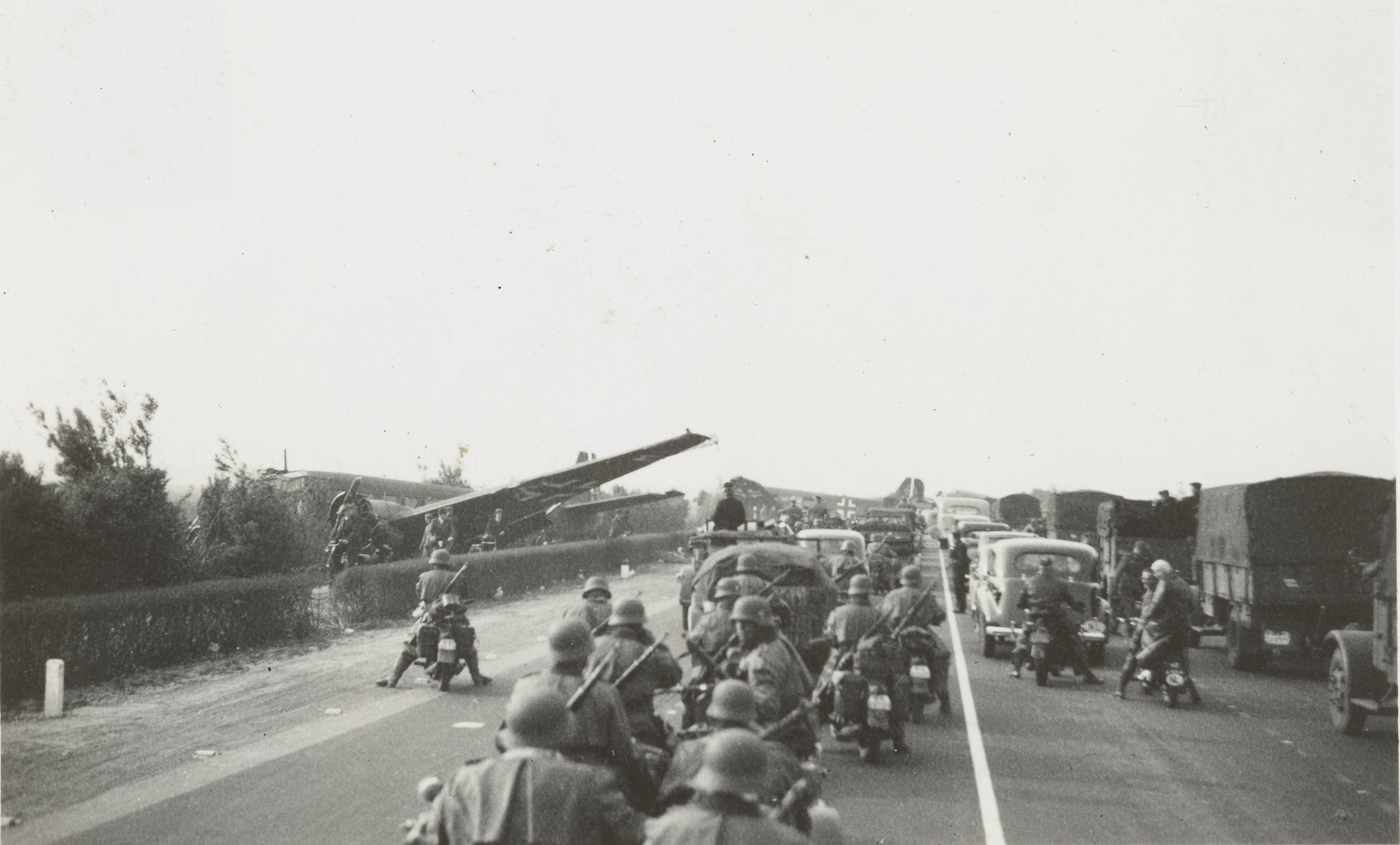
German troops passing shot down Junkers Ju 52 near Rotterdam

On the evening of 12 May, Colonel Scharroo received orders from General Headquarters to put all his efforts into clearing the German resistance at the northern approaches to the bridges, and eventually to destroy the bridges. That order was a direct consequence of the arrival of the 9th Panzerdivision at the Moerdijk bridges, which threatened the Dutch defence of Fortress Holland. The commander of the local marines—Colonel Von Frijtag Drabbe—was ordered to destroy every German pocket of resistance on the north end and next occupy the northern bridge approach in order to secure the area and prepare the bridge for destruction. He formed a company—a little over 100 men—of his most experienced marines. Another company of navy auxiliary troops—also with a strength of about 100 men—was provided as back-up. These two companies were supported by two batteries of 105 mm howitzers and two armoured cars. A company of six 81 mm mortars was also attached to the task force.

As the marines advanced, they were soon suppressed by fierce German machine gun fire from the south. The artillery had not fired a single round up to this point, but after a brief contact with the artillery battalion commander, a number of volleys were fired. All the rounds fell short or over, and after corrections failed to improve the accuracy, the artillery ceased fire. Meanwhile, the two armored cars (M39 Pantserwagens) had arrived and tried to approach the bridge. The Germans responded with fierce anti-tank fire, crippling one of the cars. Although the damaged car was able to retreat, it could no longer contribute to the assault. The second car stayed at a safe distance and was not able to challenge the Germans in the National Life Insurance building. Since the commander of the mortar company convinced the Colonel that his mortars would not be able to lay effective fire on the high building, the assault on the eastern side of the bridgehead was cancelled.

From the northwest, a full platoon of Marines advanced along the Nieuwe Maas and reached the northern headland without any German challenge. However, they were unaware of the occupation of the insurance building by the Germans. When the platoon started crossing the bridge, they were quickly spotted and the Germans opened fire from both sides. Many marines were hit, mostly fatally. The marines nevertheless immediately returned fire with their carbines and light machine guns. After a few more marines fell, the remainder retreated. Some were killed while falling back. Others found shelter underneath the bridge, but were unable to leave again. The rest of the marines found shelter under the bridge at the northern end. They were soon engaged in a firefight with a small group of Germans also taking shelter there. The Germans in the insurance building launched suppressive fire at the group. They retreated, leaving behind some casualties. After the war, the German occupants of the insurance building admitted that they had been on the verge of surrender. They were very short on ammunition, half of them had been wounded, and they had reached the point of utter exhaustion. But just when they were about to yield, the marines disappeared.

It was clear to the Dutch senior officers in Rotterdam that with the failed action against the bridges, all hope would have to be fixed on a successful defence of the northern river bank. In order to achieve such a firm defence, seven infantry companies were ordered to form a screen along the river. Both bridges were covered by three anti-tank guns each, and the three batteries 105 mm howitzers at the Kralingse Plas were ordered to prepare barrages on both headlands.

In the meantime, the first German tanks had arrived in the southern outskirts of Rotterdam. German General Schmidt—commander of XXXIX Armeekorps—was very reluctant to launch an all-out tank assault across the bridges to the north side. They had received reports of firm Dutch opposition and the presence of both Dutch artillery and anti-tank guns. The losses of tanks at the Island of Dordrecht and during an attempted bridge crossing at Barendrecht—where all four tanks had been destroyed by one Antitank gun—had impressed the Germans to such an extent that they were convinced that only a tactical aerial bombardment of the direct vicinity of the northern headland could break the Dutch resistance.

It was around this time that the German high command got involved. Hermann Göring wanted to launch an all-out aerial bombardment on the city centre. However, both Schmidt and Student were opposed to the idea and believed that all that was needed was a tactical bombardment. General Georg von Küchler, commander-in-chief over the Dutch operational area, sent instructions to Schmidt that on the morning of 14 May that an ultimatum had to be presented to the Dutch local commander in which unconditional surrender of the city would be demanded.

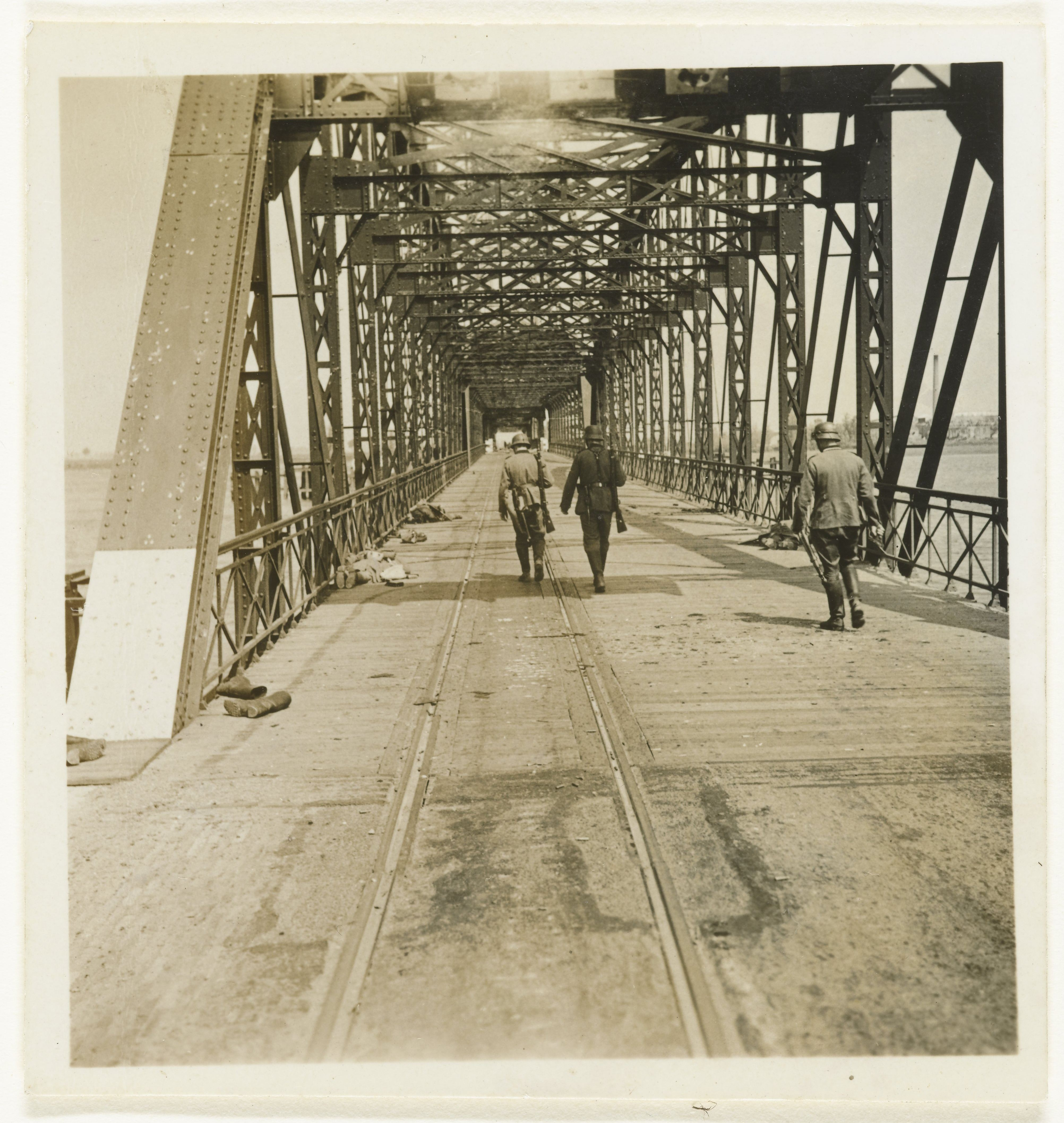
Three German soldiers walk over a bridge in Rotterdam that has just been captured. To the left of them two dead Dutch soldiers, a little more to the front a pair of boots.

=== 14 May ===
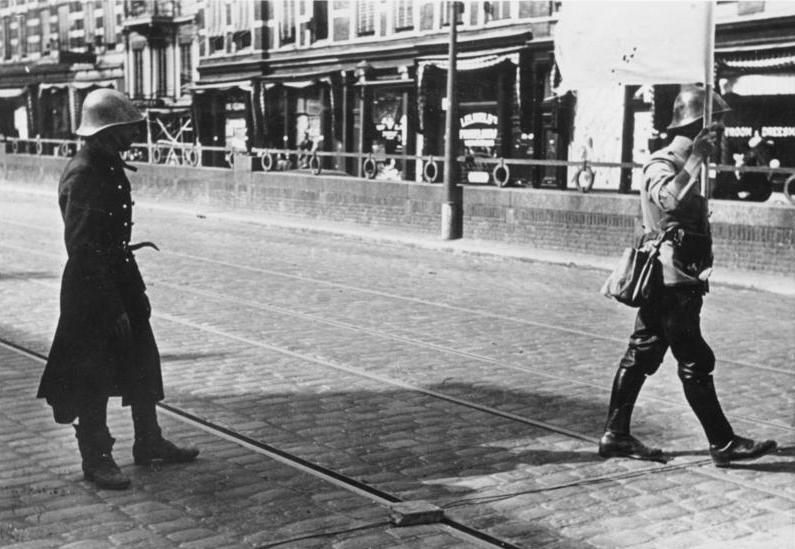
Dutch negotiator at the German occupied part of Rotterdam on 14 May 1940

On the morning of 14 May, General Schmidt prepared a quick note in the form of an ultimatum, which was to be handed over to the Dutch commander of Rotterdam. The text of the ultimatum was set in Dutch. Three German negotiators carried the ultimatum to the Maas bridges. The three men held the banner of truce, but were nevertheless treated harshly by the Dutch. They were stripped of all their weapons, which were thrown into the water, and then blindfolded. The men were then guided to the command post of Colonel Scharroo in the city.

Scharroo was handed the letter, which said that if resistance did not cease the Germans would destroy Rotterdam. Scharroo called General Headquarters and was shortly after called back with instructions from General Winkelman. The ultimatum had to be returned to the German commander with the reply that only a duly undersigned ultimatum, together with statement of name and rank of the commanding officer would be accepted by the Dutch as a legitimate parliamentary letter of ultimatum.

Colonel Scharroo sent his adjutant, Captain J. D. Backer, to the Germans with the Dutch reply. Meanwhile, Göring had ordered the Kampfgeschwader 54 (KG 54)—with its 90 Heinkel He 111 bombers—to take off from three bases near Bremen. Geschwader commander Oberst Walter Lackner led two thirds of his wing on to a course that would bring them on to the target from a northeastern angle. The other 27 bombers were commanded by Oberstleutnant Friedrich Höhne and approached Rotterdam from the south. Estimated time of arrival over the target was 13:20, Dutch time.

== The bombing ==
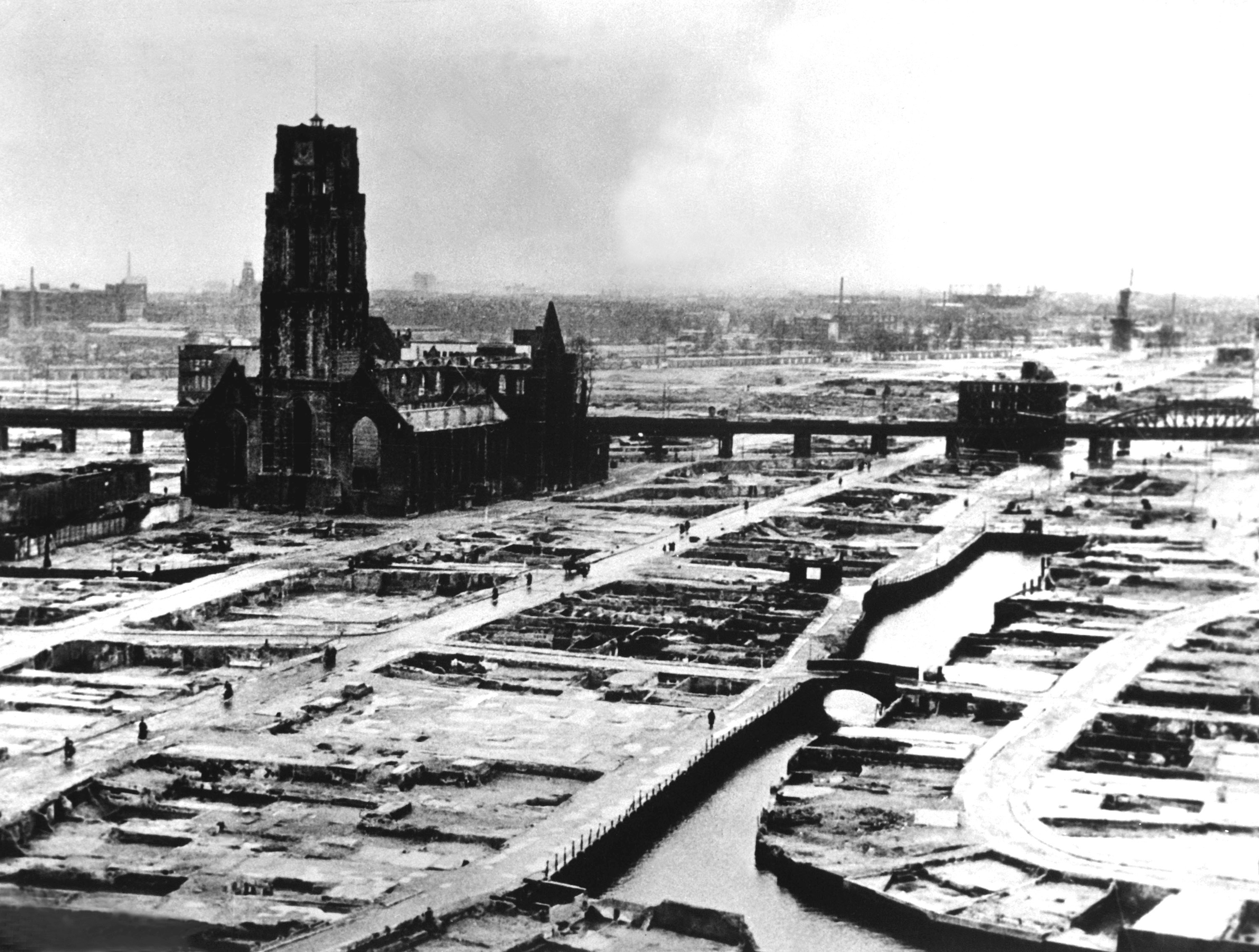
The bombing of Rotterdam

The Germans accepted the reply from Scharroo. General Schmidt had his interpreter quickly draw up a new letter, more extended than the first one, giving the Dutch until 16:20 to comply. He undersigned the new ultimatum with his name and rank. When Captain Backer was being escorted back by Oberstleutnant von Choltitzt to the Maas bridges, German bombers appeared from the south. General Schmidt, who was joined by the two Generals von Hubicki and Student, saw the planes and cried out "My God, this is going to be a catastrophe!"

Panic struck German soldiers on the Noordereiland, most of which were totally unaware of the events being played out between the top brass of both sides. They feared being attacked by their own bombers. Von Choltitz ordered red flares to be launched, and when the first three bombers overhead dropped their bombs the red flares were obscured by smoke. The next 24 bombers of the southern formation closed their bomb hatches and turned westwards.

The other much larger formation came from the northeast. It comprised 60 bombers under Oberst Lackner. Due to the dense smoke, the formation had been ordered to lower the flight plan and as such the angle with the Noordereiland in the south decreased dramatically. There was not a chance that the red flares—if at all seen—would be spotted in time before the bombs would be dropped. Indeed, the entire formation unloaded over the Rotterdam city centre. A mixture of 250 kg (550 lb) and 50 kg (110 lb) bombs rained over the defenceless city.

Eight hundred to nine hundred people were killed, over 80,000 people lost their homes and more than 25,000 buildings were destroyed.

== Dutch surrender ==
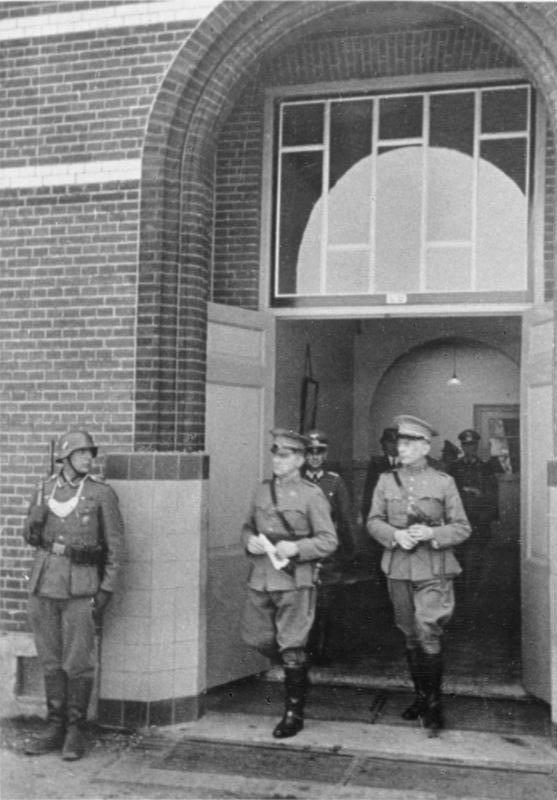
General Henri Winkelman after signing the Dutch capitulation on 15 May 1940

The Dutch defences were hardly hit by the raid and basically stayed intact. However, the fires soon started threatening some of their positions. The troops started to pull back. In the meantime, Colonel Scharroo—by then totally isolated from The Hague since all communication lines had been destroyed—had to decide the fate of the defence of Rotterdam. The Mayor and his aldermen insisted that the city had to capitulate. The Colonel sent them away. He realised that his decision would not only decide the fate of Rotterdam, but possibly that of the whole country. After a brief moment of deliberation Scharroo made the decision to capitulate, which General Winkelman approved of by means of his direct representative, Lieutenant-Colonel Wilson. The latter would convey the Colonel's decision—which he had sanctioned on behalf of the CIC—to General Winkelman later that afternoon. The General concurred.

The Colonel himself accompanied by his adjutant and a Sergeant Major went to the bridges to present the capitulation of the city. He met General Schmidt at the bridge and expressed his resentment over the broken word of a senior officer of the German Wehrmacht. General Schmidt— himself surprised by the Luftwaffe action—could do nothing but express his appreciation. He replied: "Herr Oberst, ich verstehe wenn Sie bitter sind" ("Colonel, I fully understand your bitterness").

At around 18:00, the first German troops started to work their way through the blazing town. The Dutch troops in Rotterdam no longer resisted. They laid down their arms, as ordered by their commanding officer. In the evening, the Germans reached Overschie, where a brief skirmish with a local Dutch outfit—unaware of the cease fire—cost one SS man his life.

== Aftermath ==
Meanwhile, a meeting took place between Captain Backer (being the official representative of the Dutch commander Scharroo) and the Germans led by Generalleutnant Student. The meeting was intended to arrange the final details of the surrender. Scharroo had refused to attend. He was very upset about the German "breach of their word of honour" and refused any further contact with them whatsoever.

At the same time, a Dutch battalion was assembling for their surrender, as ordered by the German military authority. For security reasons a huge white flag was waved to also arriving SS men. Suddenly, the German SS battalion, seeing so many armed Dutch troops in the square, started shooting. General Student—who had just opened the meeting, ran to the window and about the same time—was hit by a bullet in the head. He fell, still conscious, but was severely wounded. It took the skill of a Dutch surgeon to save his life. He would recover, but he remained hospitalised until January 1941. The German soldiers considered the fact that their famous General had been shot a yellow act of Dutch betrayal. All Dutch soldiers and officers—including civilians present—were lined up by the outraged SS in order to be executed on the spot. Machine guns were positioned in front of them. However, Oberstleutnant Von Choltitz—also present at the meeting—stopped the execution. An investigation was launched, which later proved that it had been a stray German bullet that had hit Student.

== See also ==
- List of Dutch military equipment of World War II
- List of German military equipment of World War II
- List of British military equipment of World War II
