= Battle of the Hague (1940) =

Battle during WW2

Battle for The Hague
- Part of the Battle of the Netherlands
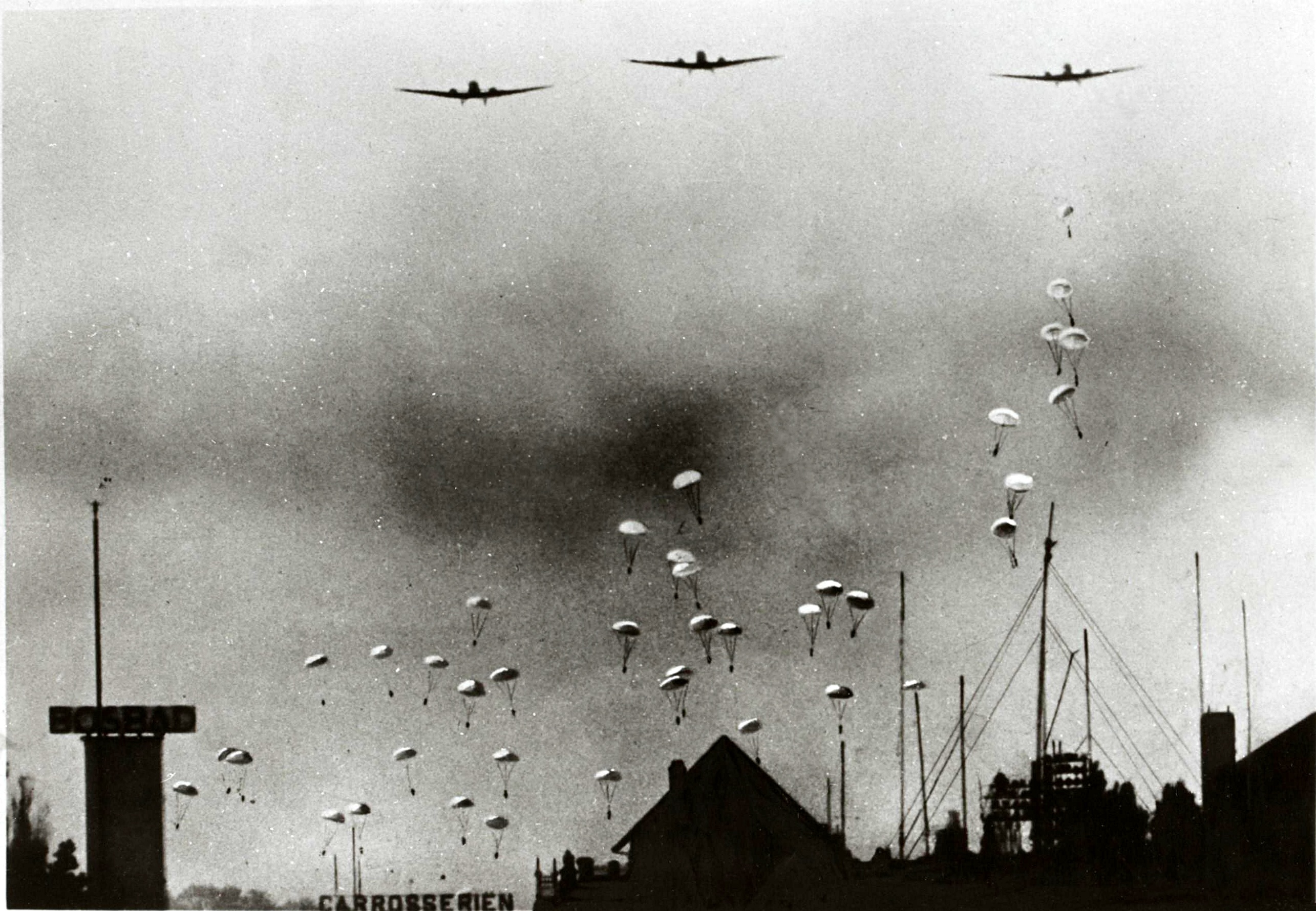
- German paratroopers above The Hague
Date	10 May 1940
Location	The Hague, Netherlands 52°5′N 4°19′E
Result	Dutch victory: Failure of the Fallschirmjäger to hold initial gains; Dutch counter-attacks lead to the failure of the German objective of capturing The Hague

Belligerents
Netherlands	Germany

Commanders and leaders
Henri Winkelman	Hans von Sponeck; Kurt Student

Units involved
Royal Netherlands Army	22nd Air Landing Division

Strength
11,100; 2 armoured car squadrons 4 bombers 1 destroyer	3,000

Casualties and losses
515 killed 1,000 wounded	134–400 killed 700 wounded 1,745 captured 125 aircraft destroyed 47 aircraft damaged

The Battle for The Hague (Dutch: Slag om Den Haag) took place on 10 May 1940 during the Battle of the Netherlands. German Fallschirmjäger units were dropped in and around The Hague to capture Dutch airfields and the city itself.

After securing a bridgehead, Nazi Germany had expected the Netherlands to surrender that day. The Germans, however, failed to achieve that objective since their forces had been unable to hold onto their initial gains. That is because the Dutch regrouped and then launched effective counter-attacks. Isolated pockets of German troops, led by Hans von Sponeck, retreated to the nearby dunes, where they were continually pursued and harassed for five days, when Henri Winkelman, the Dutch commander-in-chief, was forced to surrender by major setbacks on other fronts.

== Background ==
The Germans planned, under the codename Fall Festung, to catch the Dutch off guard and then to isolate the head of the Dutch Army. Their intention was to fly over the Netherlands to lull the Dutch into thinking that the United Kingdom was their target. That was to be followed by approaching the country from the direction of the North Sea; attacking the airfields at Ypenburg, Ockenburg and Valkenburg to weaken potential Dutch defenses; and taking The Hague. It was expected that Queen Wilhelmina and Henri Winkelman, the commander-in-chief of the Dutch Army, might then agree to surrender. However, German plans were otherwise to cut off all roads leading to The Hague to quell any subsequent Dutch counter-attack. One of the German main goals was the capture of the Dutch Queen and government. Captured plans, the so-called "Sponeck papers", contained details and a map for the German paratroopers that had landed at the Ockenburg airstrip. However, the troops were unable to penetrate the defence of The Hague and so the plan failed.

== Battle ==
=== German invasion ===
Bombardments on army barracks and air drops of German paratroopers at the three airports near The Hague. One of their main but unattained goals was the capture of Queen Wilhelmina.

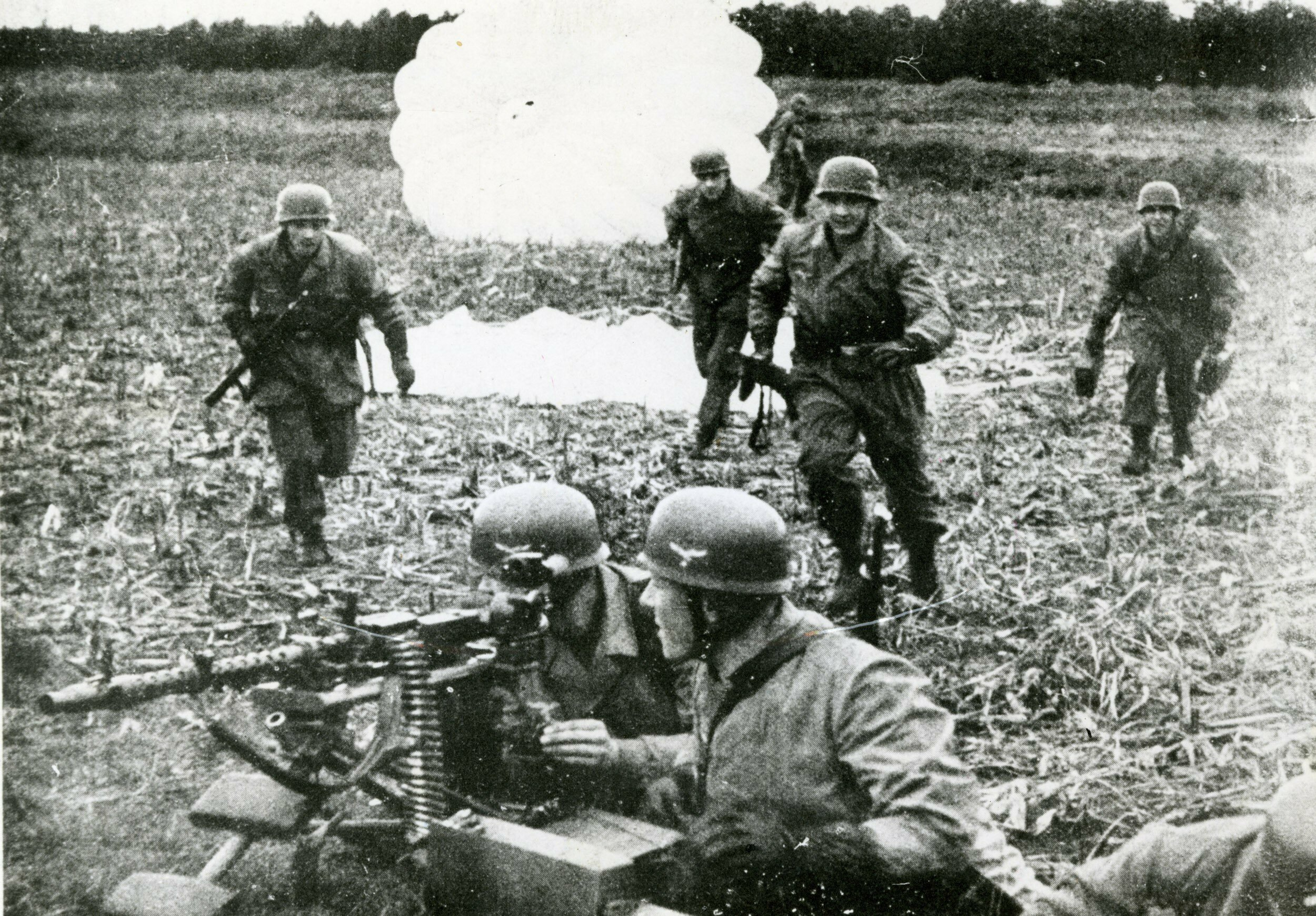
German airborne troops immediately after landing; exact location unknown.

As planned, the Luftwaffe flew over the Netherlands in the early morning hours of 10 May, but rather than deceiving the people of The Hague, their passage alarmed them. A different group of German airplanes flew directly to The Hague and at 04:00 bombed the New Alexander Army Barracks and the adjacent Waalsdorp Army Camp, and 66 and 58 men were killed respectively. The other German air group circled back from the sea and bombed the airfield at Ypenburg at approximately 04:15. Immediately thereafter, transport planes began dropping paratroopers in several waves onto the field and its surroundings, but Dutch machine gun fire inflicted casualties and scattered their landings. Many planes were forced to land either damaged or destroyed by the defenders, which blocked further arrivals. German troops attacked and occupied the airfield's main building and raised the German flag to signal victory. However, the Dutch managed to prevent the Germans from advancing beyond Ypenburg to enter The Hague.

Around the same time, German troops were dropped at the airstrip in Ockenburg. The defenders were unable to prevent the Germans from taking the airfield but delayed them long enough to secure the arrival of additional Dutch infantry units, which prevented the Germans from advancing into The Hague. As the Germans were using the Ockenburg airstrip to strengthen their numbers, the Dutch bombed it to prevent it from being used any further.

The Valkenburg airstrip was only partially constructed at the time, but as with Ypenburg, the Germans troops bombed it and then dropped troops, which caused the defenders heavy casualties. Although subsequent waves of paratroopers also sustained heavy casualties, the defenders were unable to prevent the airstrip from falling into the hands of the German invaders. However, because of its partial construction, the Germans could not take off from it, which rendered further transports unable to land. Many landed on the nearby beaches and were destroyed by Dutch planes and by shelling from the Dutch destroyer HNLMS Van Galen. After several ground skirmishes, German troops occupied the village of Valkenburg and some of the bridges and buildings at Katwijk, along the Old Rhine.

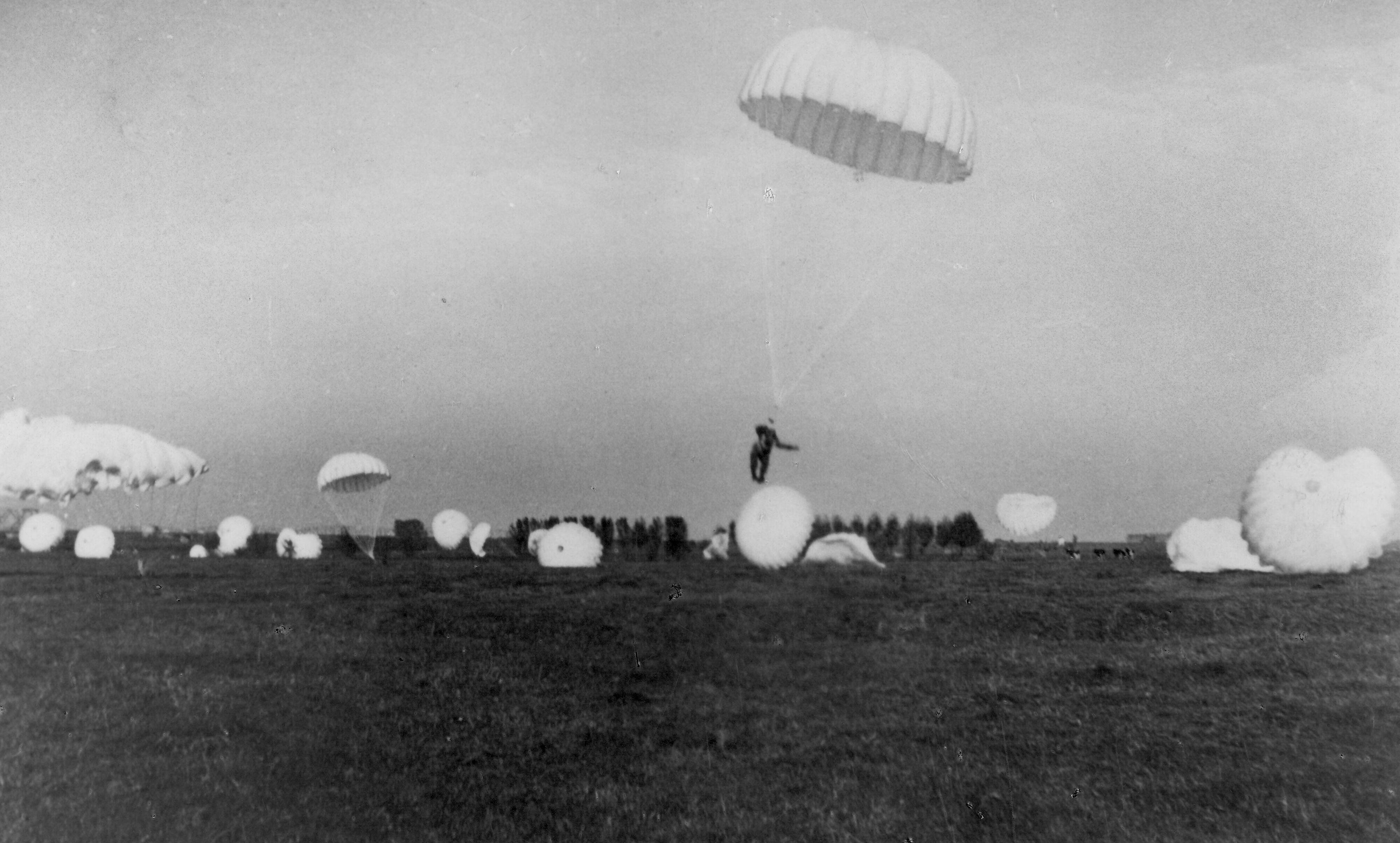
German paratroopers landing at Ockenburg airstrip near The Hague, 10 May 1940

=== Dutch counter-offensive ===
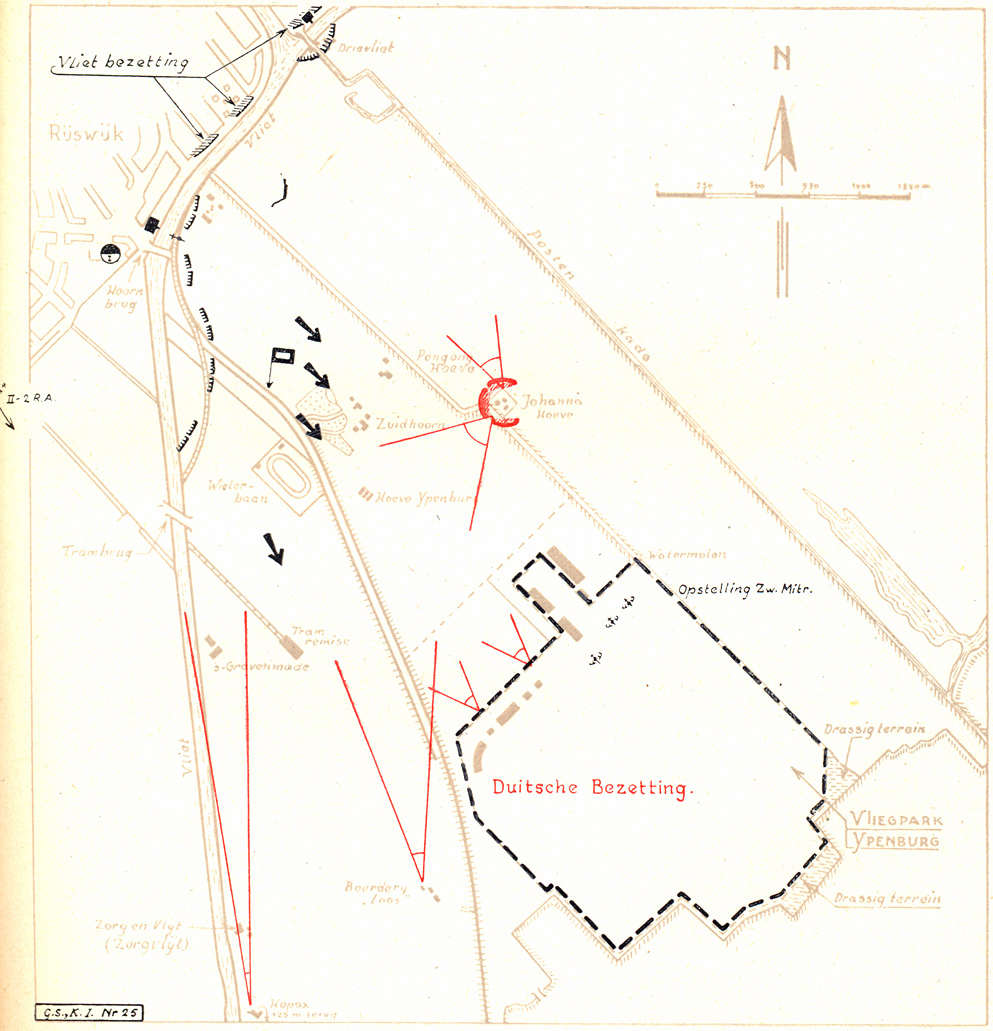
The Dutch counter-attack at Ypenburg

Although the German troops had managed to capture the three airfields, they failed in their primary objectives of taking the city of The Hague and of forcing the Dutch to surrender. Accordingly, the Dutch Army launched a counter-offensive from Ypenburg several hours later. Outnumbered and relying on captured ammunition, the Dutch Grenadier Guards fought their way into a position suitable enough to launch artillery attacks against the airstrip and heavily damaged it. German troops were forced to evacuate the burning buildings and so lost their strong defensive position. The Dutch grenadiers managed to recapture the airstrip and to capture many German soldiers in subsequent skirmishes.

Four Dutch Fokker T.Vs bombed the Ockenburg airstrip and destroyed idle Junkers Ju 52s. The Dutch troops then followed up with an assault and forced the Germans to retreat. The Dutch still managed to capture several prisoners-of-war. However, a pocket of German troops withdrew to the nearby woods and successfully held off any additional attacks by Dutch troops, who soon disengaged and were redirected towards Loosduinen. That allowed the Germans to head back toward Rotterdam.

Having sealed off Leiden and Wassenaar, the Dutch recaptured an important bridge near Valkenburg. After the arrival of reinforcements, they began to harass the Germans on the ground. Meanwhile, Dutch bombers managed to destroy grounded German transport planes. The Germans put up a defense on the outskirts of the airfield but were forced to retreat because of the heavy concentrated fire. By 17:30 the Dutch had secured the area, and the Germans had evacuated to the nearby village.

Several skirmishes to liberate occupied positions were fought between small pockets on both sides. The Dutch used artillery support from the nearby village of Oegstgeest, which was heavily damaged as a result.

By the end of the day, Dutch forces had retaken the airfields, but the tactical victory was shortlived. On 14 May, the bombing of Rotterdam by the Luftwaffe forced General Winkelman to capitulate.

== Aftermath ==
The remaining German forces that had escaped from the airfields ended up being scattered over the dunes in the area. Von Sponeck was ordered to assist the attack on Rotterdam. On his way to Rotterdam, Von Sponeck's isolated group twice avoided Dutch traps, but still 1,600 troops under his command were captured, with 1,200 being shipped to the UK as prisoners-of-war. He was eventually forced to dig in with as many as 1,100 men and himself managed to avoid capture only because of the strategic bombing of Rotterdam on 14 May, which some speculate was because Hermann Göring had insisted on preventing Von Sponeck's humiliation in face of certain defeat. A pocket of German paratroops managed to ward off enemy attacks at the village of Valkenburg until the Dutch surrender. The Dutch Queen and Cabinet were able to flee to Britain and constitute a government-in-exile.

The Dutch suffered 515 dead. One bomber was shot down following a raid on Ockenburg. German estimates have 134 deaths of their own, but Dutch sources estimate 400 Germans were killed, 700 wounded and 1,745 captured. German material losses include 182 transport aircraft, mostly Ju 52s. The heavy loss of aircraft was unforeseen, with Generalfeldmarschall Albert Kesselring stating after the war that the subsequent aircraft shortage had directly contributed to the defeat of the Luftwaffe at the Battle of Britain and had been the cause of heavy German casualties at the invasion of Crete. The Germans' preferred method of landing their troops was no longer feasible, and so an airborne assault was needed.

== See also ==
- List of Dutch military equipment of World War II
- List of German military equipment of World War II
