= P. W. Scharroo =

Dutch military commander (1883–1963)

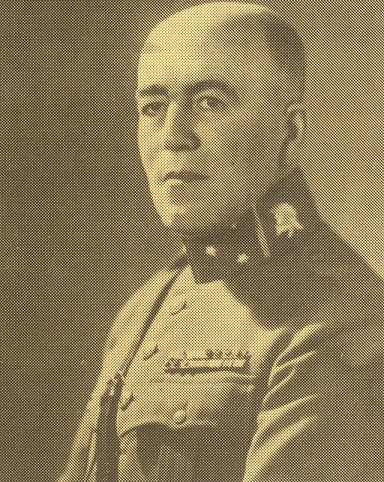
- Scharroo in 1940
- Born: Pieter Wilhelmus Scharroo; 16 September 1883; The Hague, Netherlands
- Died: 19 August 1963 (aged 79); The Hague, Netherlands
- Military career
- Allegiance: Netherlands
- Branch: Royal Netherlands Army
- Service years: 1904–1940
- Rank: Colonel
- Battles: Battle of Rotterdam

Pieter Wilhelmus Scharroo (16 September 1883 – 19 August 1963) was a Dutch military commander in charge during the Battle of Rotterdam. While he was trying to negotiate a ceasefire with his German counterparts, the Rotterdam Blitz took place. Frustrated by the bombing, he refused to continue the negotiations with the German army.

Scharroo was born in The Hague. Prior to the Second World War, he had an impressive civil and military career in the Netherlands as well as the Dutch East Indies. Scharroo was also a long-time member of the International Olympic Committee.

After the war he retired from the army and started a career as a hydrological adviser. He died, aged 79, in his home city of The Hague. He was never decorated for his attempts to defend the city of Rotterdam.
