= Rotterdam City Hall =

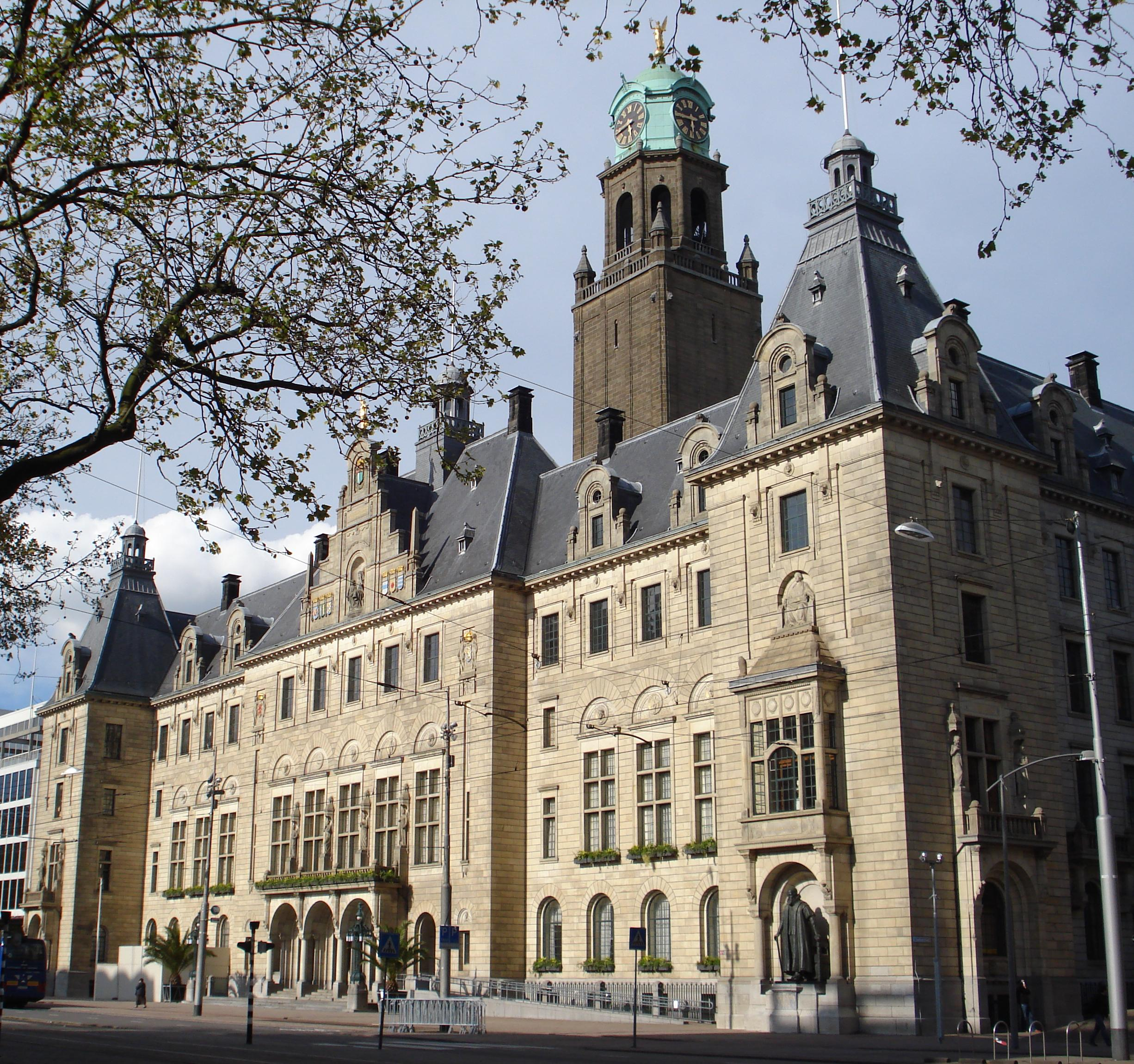
- City Hall
- Interactive map of the Rotterdam City Hall area
- Alternative names: Stadhuis van Rotterdam

General information
- Type: Seat of local government
- Architectural style: Renaissance Revival
- Location: Rotterdam, Coolsingel 40
- Coordinates: 51°55′22″N 4°28′47″E
- Completed: 1920

Design and construction
- Architect: Henri Evers

Rotterdam City Hall was built between 1914 and 1920 by Henri Evers. It is one of the few buildings in the center of Rotterdam that survived the bombing of May 14, 1940. Since 10 October 2000 it has been recognized as a Rijksmonument.

== History ==
Rotterdam's first city hall stood on Hoogstraat and was housed in an old 14th-century urban boarding house. However, By the end of the 19th century, the building could no longer accommodate municipal activities, so in 1905 it was decided to build a new building to house the council chamber on Coolsingel. To make room for the new buildings, an entire neighborhood, Zandstraat, where about 2,400 people lived, was demolished.

Architect Henri Evers drew a first draft in 1911 and presented the final design to the city council, which declared it the winner in 1913. There were several controversies regarding Evers' victory both because there was substantial support for the design drawn by Willem Kromhout and because the mayor at the time, Alfred Rudolph Zimmerman, had close ties to Evers.

Work began in 1914 but the foundation stone was laid on 15 July 1915 in the presence of Queen Wilhelmina, and the inauguration took place after the work was completed with a special session of the city council on 1 September 1920. The construction cost NLG 2,850,000.

Following the 1940 bombing, the building remained virtually intact, but the heat surrounding it damaged the structure's concrete.

== Description ==
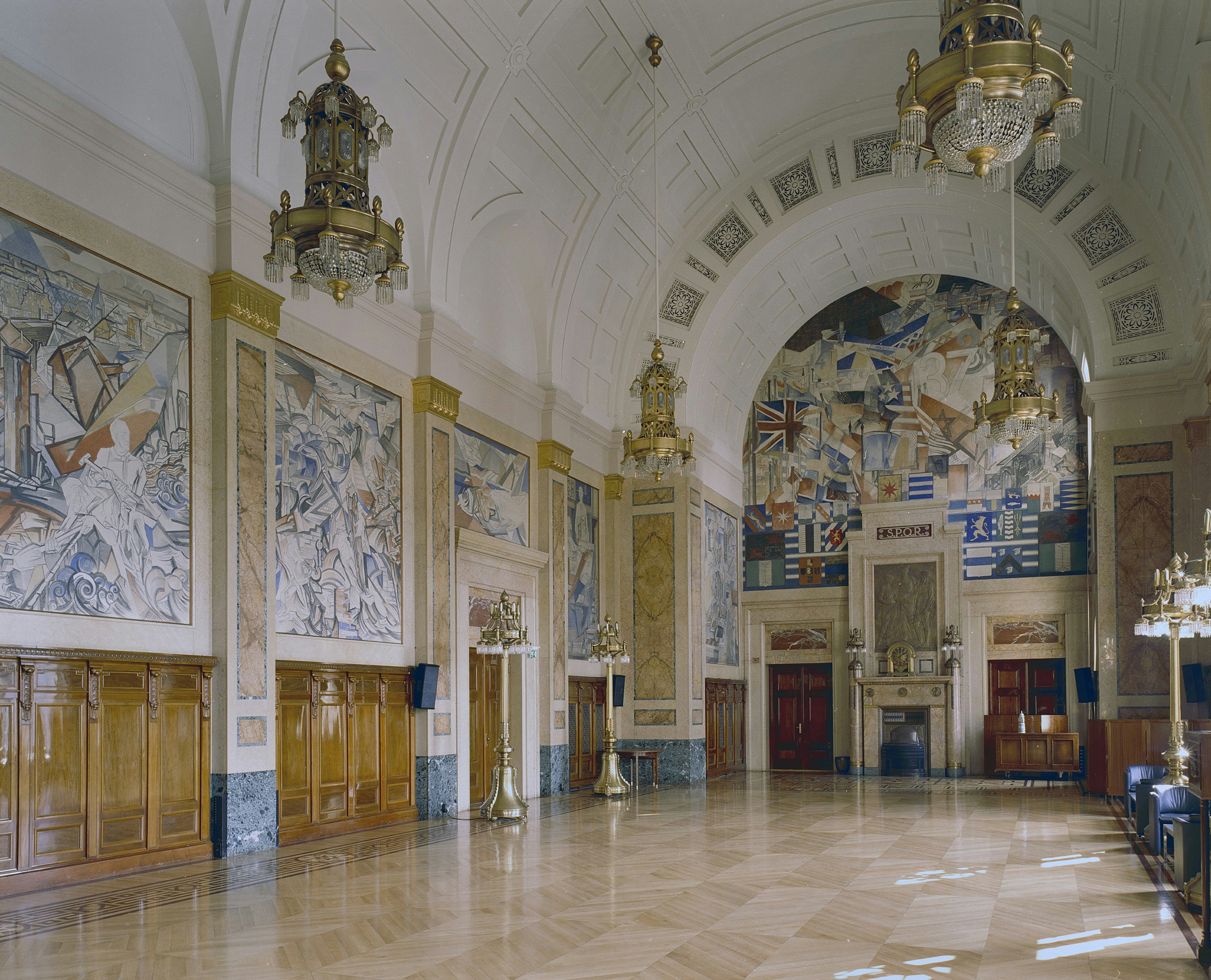
The Burgerzaal

The clock tower stands in the center of the main facade on Coolsingel, at the top of the building's central hall, and is 71 meters high. A gold statue depicting an angel, the work of sculptor Johan Keller, is placed at the top.
