= Ockenburg =

Former airfield in the Netherlands

Coordinates: 52.060°N 4.217°E

Ockenburg was a small Dutch auxiliary airfield near The Hague, in operation from 1919 to 1946. During May 10 to May 12, 1940, it was the scene of bitter fighting between German airborne forces and Dutch defenders during World War II.

== History ==
In 1915 already there was airplane-related activity; an airplane may have been constructed in a building on the site, and in May a privately owned plane was moved to Ockenburg, apparently for the purpose of teaching pilots.

Plans for a airfield near The Hague were in the making: in April 1919 the city council of The Hague discussed buying a parcel of land for an airport in Westduinen, and plans were presented at a national airshow in Amsterdam in September 1919. The plans presented at the airshow in Amsterdam were very ambitious, and included runways, a restaurant, and areas for private planes; the planners envisioned multiple flights per day to Amsterdam, and perhaps to Rotterdam. Also included was a building along the lines of the Scheepvaarthuis in Amsterdam, which was to be a central national location to organize and showcase travel by plane.

In 1938, Ockenburg became an auxiliary base for the Dutch Air Force, one of many constructed in the country in anticipation of expansion. A sports park had been constructed on the area a few years before, and their porters' lodge became part of the airfield as well. The airfield was opened on 13 November 1939. It had one single runway, of ca. 600 bij 200 meter, and was surrounded by a ditch.

== World War II ==
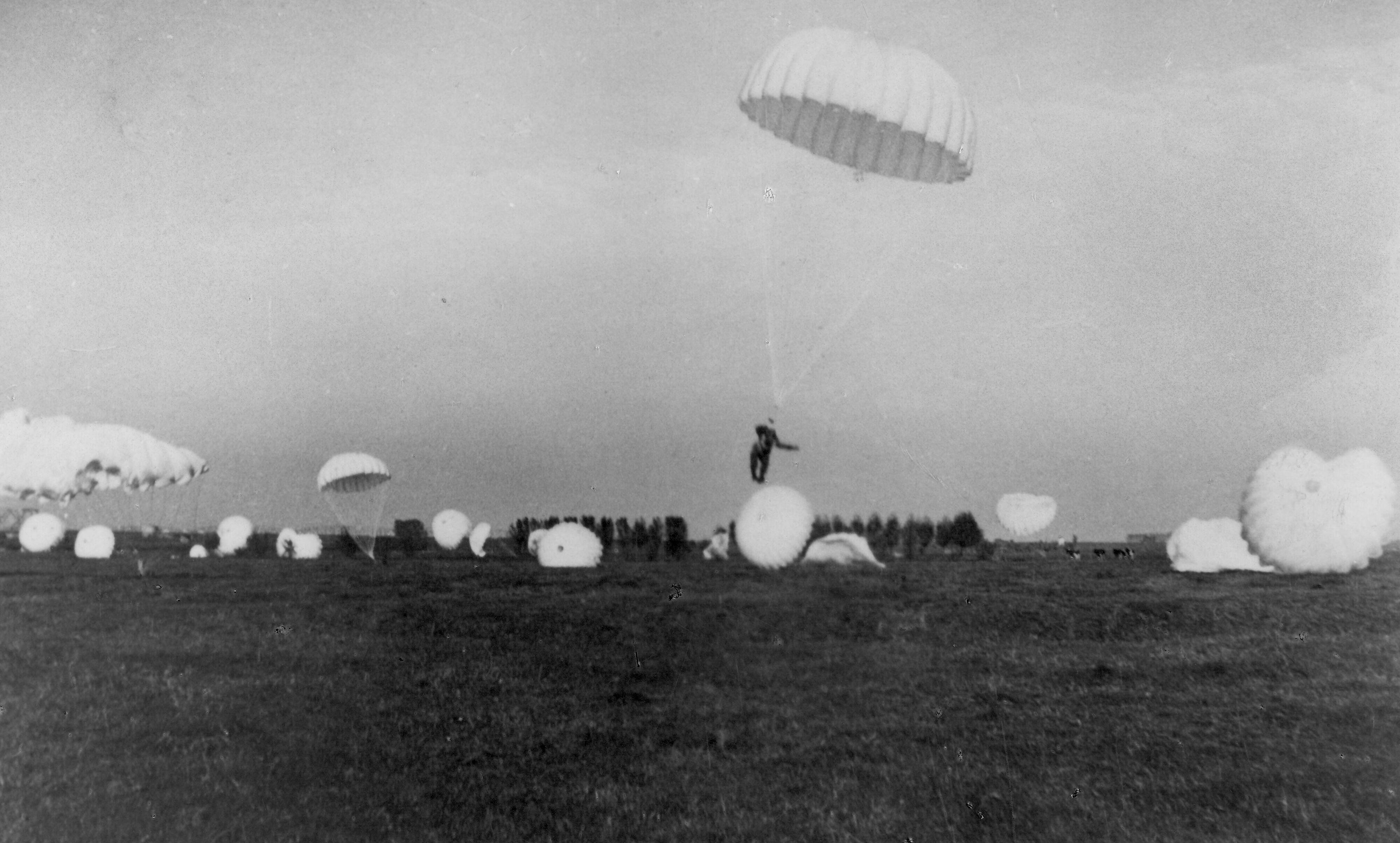
German paratroopers landing at Ockenburg

A German formation of one airborne company of Fallschirmjaeger Regiment 2 and a battalion of Air landing troops of IR.65 (22.ID) was envisaged to take the small base by surprise attack. The strike was part of the grand strategy to seize the Dutch city of the Hague, where the Dutch royal family, Cabinet and Military headquarters were situated. The German battle-plan incorporated large combined airborne and airlanding elements to land at the large Dutch Air Force bases at Valkenburg (South Holland) and Ypenburg and a smaller party at Ockenburg. These three were situated east, south and west of the Hague. Around 8,000 Germans were scheduled to land and march onto the Hague, snatching the Dutch royal family and beheading the Dutch military by capturing their command-centres.

The German air-operation against the Hague failed utterly. At Ypenburg the German airborne battalion and follow-up air landing units initially gained some successes, but they were rapidly pushed into defence. Many were captured or killed. Some hundreds managed to sustain Dutch counter-attacks isolating themselves in the hamlet Overschie.

At Valkenburg the Germans first managed to seize the airfield running the Dutch defenders off. But after re-grouping the Dutch countered the German pocket and pushed the about 1,000 men strong German presence into a tight defence in the village Valkenburg itself, though they couldn't manage to force the surviving Germans into surrender.

The landing at Ockenburg also resulted in initial German seizure of the base, and which 25 Dutch defenders were killed in action. Soon, however, the German landing party - no more than around 400 men - were driven off of the pitch and pushed into the dune area between the airfield and the North Sea. In a daring attempt to break out during the following days, the German force (led by the commander of 22.ID, Lieutenant General Hans Graf von Sponeck himself) managed to outmanoeuvre quite substantial Dutch formations and eventually reach the German held pocket at the hamlet Overschie. At that position a combined remnant force of around 1,000 German invaders managed to hold out until being relieved by German ground-forces in the evening of May 14, 1940, after the Rotterdam Blitz.

=== Outcome ===
The German offensive against the Hague constituted a considerable tactical loss to the Germans. The operational goal was not achieved, notwithstanding the fact that large Dutch formations had been tied around the German pockets for quite some time, and could not be assigned other tasks at that time.

The Dutch lost 29 men during the AFB defensive battle and the following skirmishes. Another 41 men were lost in counter-offensive actions that saw the Dutch regain the airfield, but failed to mop up the German main force who, in turn, rebuffed Dutch attempts to overrun their elevated dune positions. Plaques commemorate the dead.

The Germans lost 52 men in the battle for Ockenburg, including 8 men Luftwaffe personnel. An unknown number was taken prisoner and shipped to Scheveningen and from there on to Ymuiden, from where on 13 and 14 May 1940 ships managed to reach the United Kingdom.

The Luftwaffe lost around 250 airplanes in the area of the Hague. 500 men were killed and about 1,250 airbornes, air-landing troops, and Luftwaffe personnel were evacuated as POW's to the United Kingdom on 14 May 1940. The event outraged Hermann Göring; he had several Dutch officers arrested and interrogated.

== After the war ==
The only existing building is the former porters' lodge, on Wijndaelerweg 5, 7, and 9; this is now a municipal monument, maintained by the municipality of The Hague.

== Gallery ==
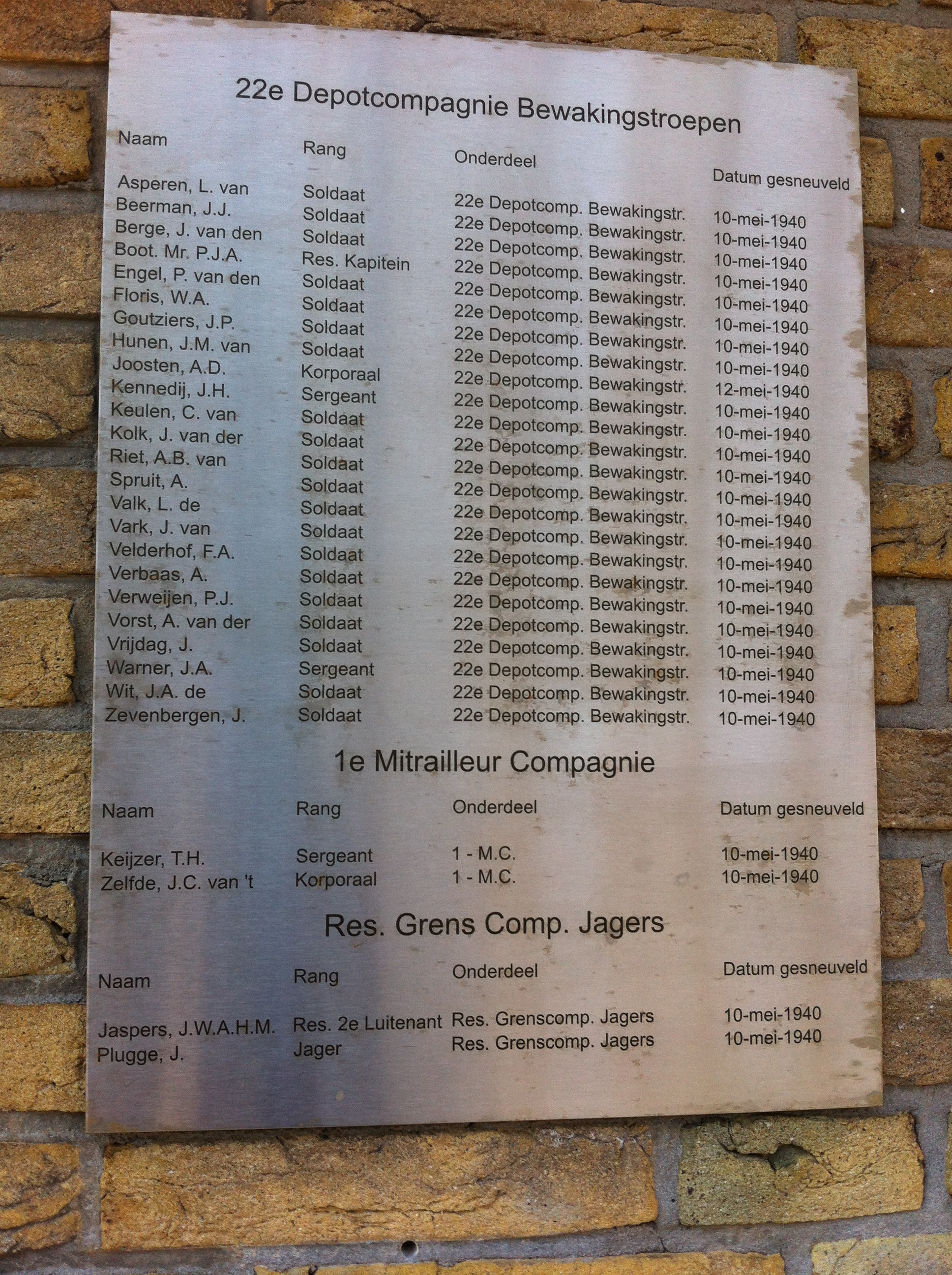

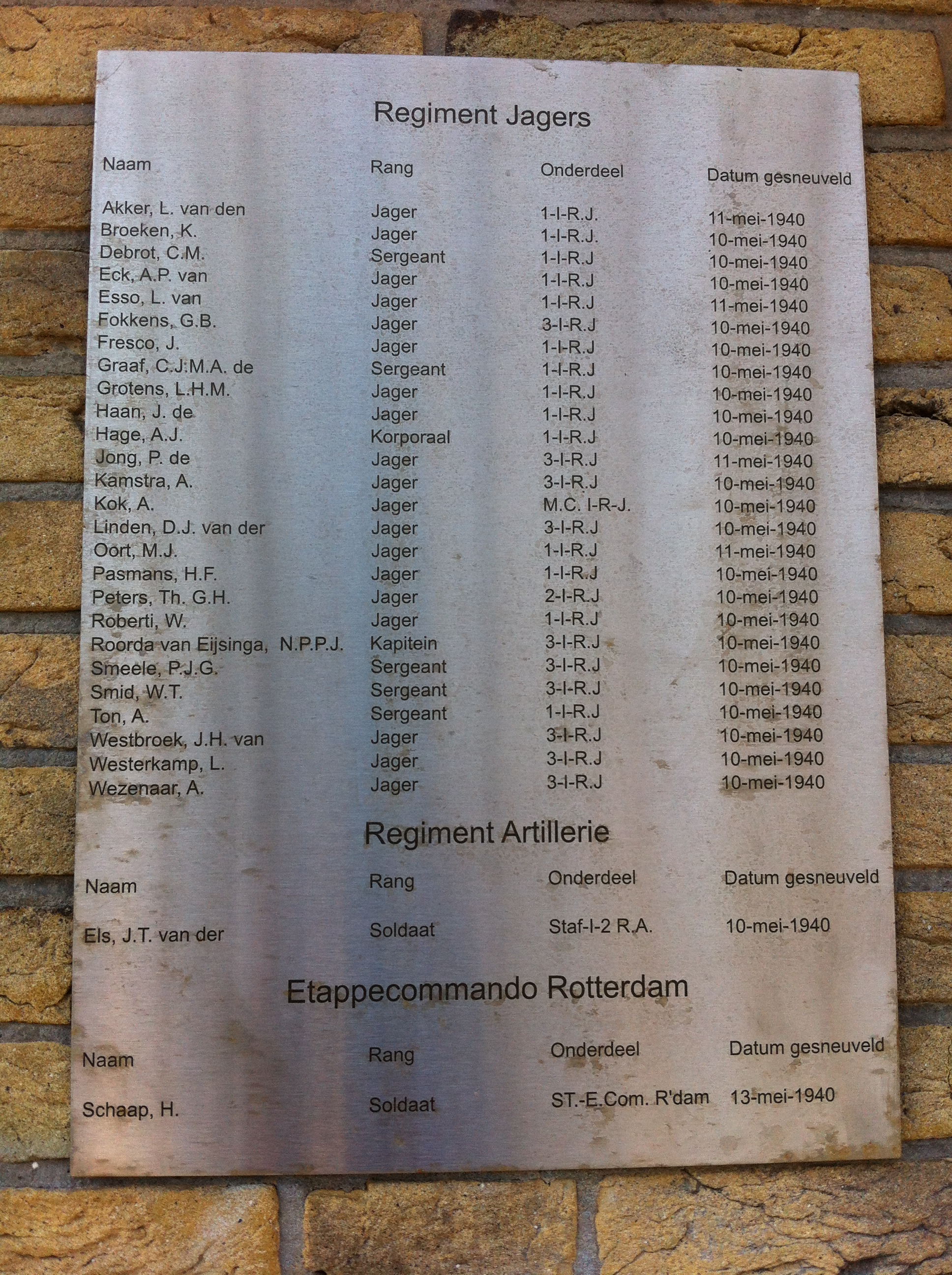

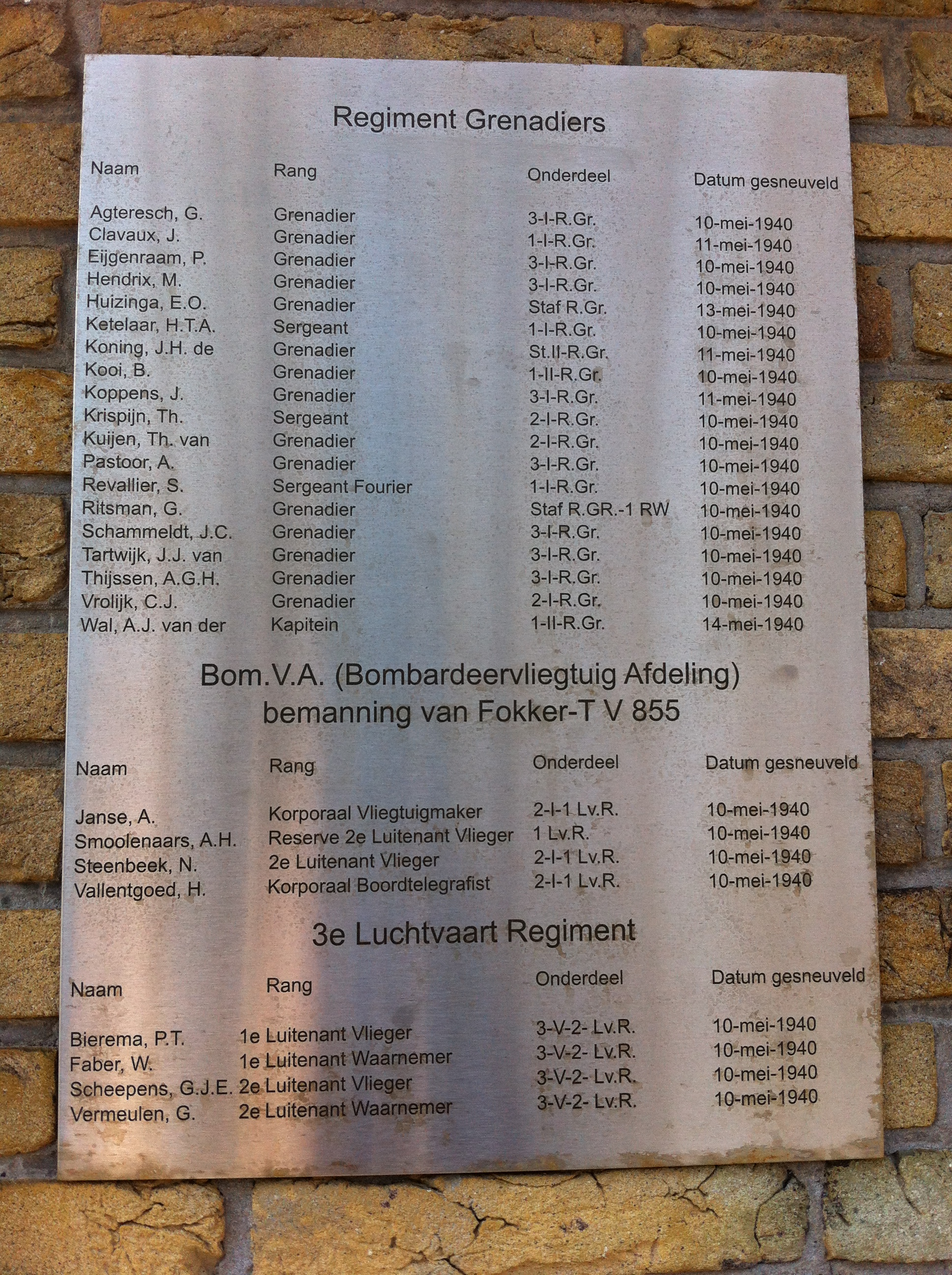
