= List of Rotterdam Metro stations =

The following is the list of the 70 stations on the Rotterdam Metro system in Rotterdam, Netherlands. The Rotterdam Metro has five metro lines, lines A through E. Line E is also referred to by the brand name RandstadRail, although it is operated by the same company as lines A through D. At Beurs station, one can transfer among all five lines.

Line A	Line B	Line C	Line D	Line E
	Hoek van Holland Strand			
	Hoek van Holland Haven			
	Steendijkpolder			
	Maassluis West			
	Maassluis Centrum			
Vlaardingen West	Vlaardingen West			
Vlaardingen Centrum				
Vlaardingen Oost				
Schiedam Nieuwland				
		De Akkers		
		Heemraadlaan		
		Spijkenisse Centrum		
		Zalmplaat		
		Hoogvliet		
		Tussenwater		
		Pernis		
		Vijfsluizen		
		Troelstralaan		
		Parkweg		
Schiedam Centrum				
Marconiplein				
Delfshaven				
Coolhaven				
Dijkzigt				
Eendrachtsplein				
			Poortugaal	
			Rhoon	
			Slinge	
			Zuidplein	
			Maashaven	
			Rijnhaven	
			Wilhelminaplein	
			Leuvehaven	
Beurs			Beurs	
Blaak				
Oostplein				
Gerdesiaweg				
Voorschoterlaan				
Kralingse Zoom				
Capelsebrug				
Schenkel				
Prinsenlaan				
Oosterflank				
Alexander				
Graskruid				
Romeynshof				
Binnenhof				
	Hesseplaats			
	Nieuw Verlaat			
	Ambachtsland			
	De Tochten			
	Nesselande			
		Slotlaan		
		Capelle Centrum		
		De Terp		
			Stadhuis	
			Rotterdam Centraal	
				Blijdorp
				Melanchthonweg
				Meijersplein
				Rodenrijs
				Berkel Westpolder
				Pijnacker Zuid
				Pijnacker Centrum
				Nootdorp
				Leidschenveen
				Forepark
				Leidschendam-Voorburg
				Voorburg 't Loo
				Laan van NOI
				Den Haag Centraal
Line A	Line B	Line C	Line D	Line E

== See also ==
- Rotterdam Metro
- RandstadRail
- List of metro systems
