= Rotterdam Hofplein railway station =

Former railway station in Rotterdam, the Netherlands

Rotterdam Hofplein
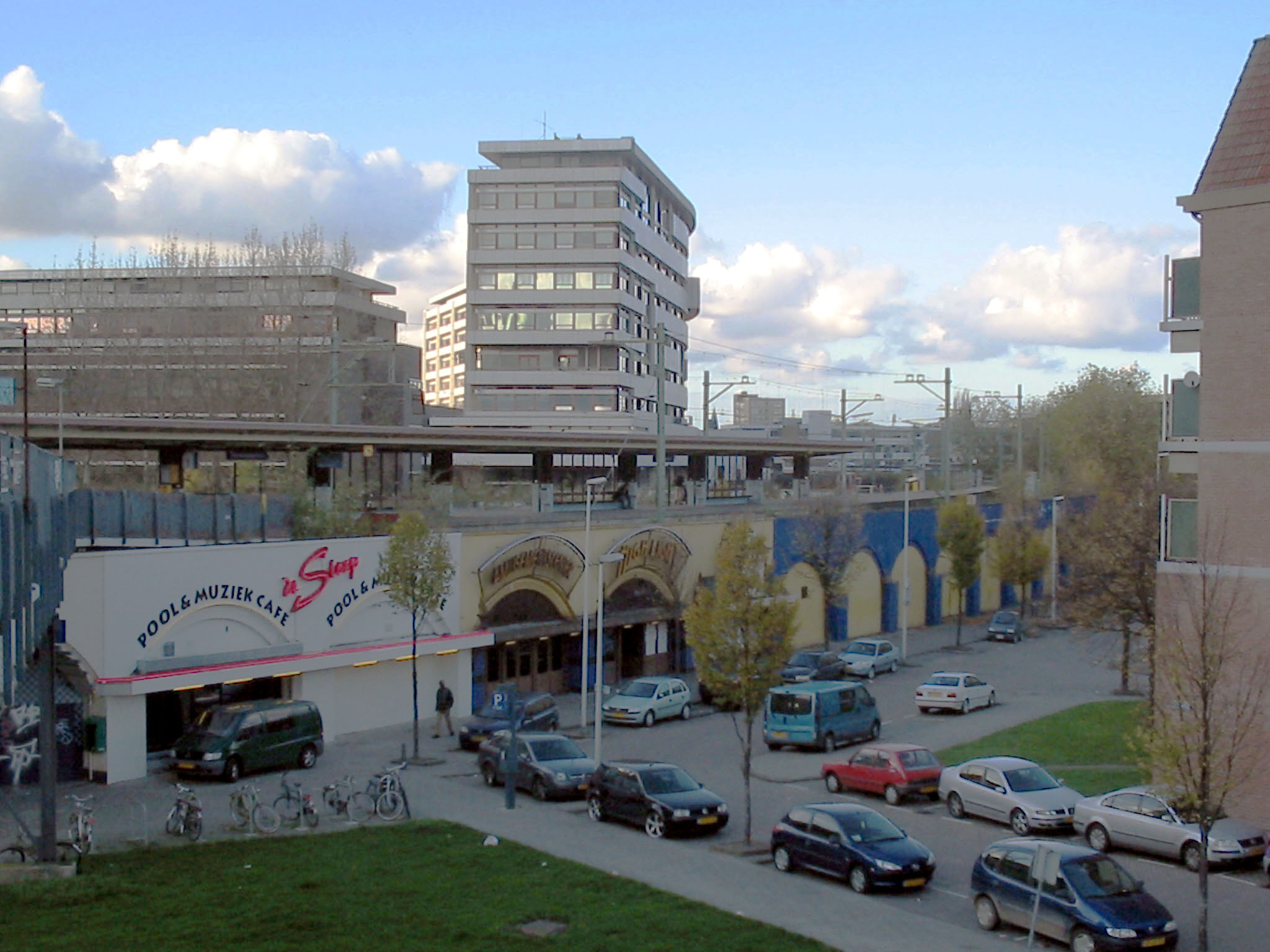
- Hofplein in 2005

General information
- Location: Netherlands
- Coordinates: 51°55′37″N 4°28′45″E
- Platforms: 1

Other information
- Station code: Rth

History
- Opened: 1 Oct 1908, reopened 10 Sep 2006
- Closed: 3 Jun 2006, reclosed 16 Aug 2010
Location
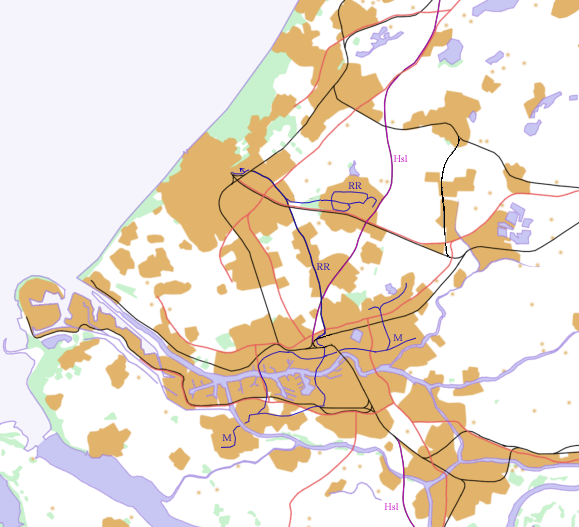
- Location within Southwest Randstad Location within Netherlands

Rotterdam Hofplein railway station in the Netherlands is a former main-line and RandstadRail station. It was the terminus of the former Hofpleinlijn (Hofplein line) which ran trains between Rotterdam and Scheveningen, and were later curtailed to The Hague central station. It was located very close to the railway line between Rotterdam Centraal and Rotterdam Blaak, but never had a direct connection to it.

== History ==
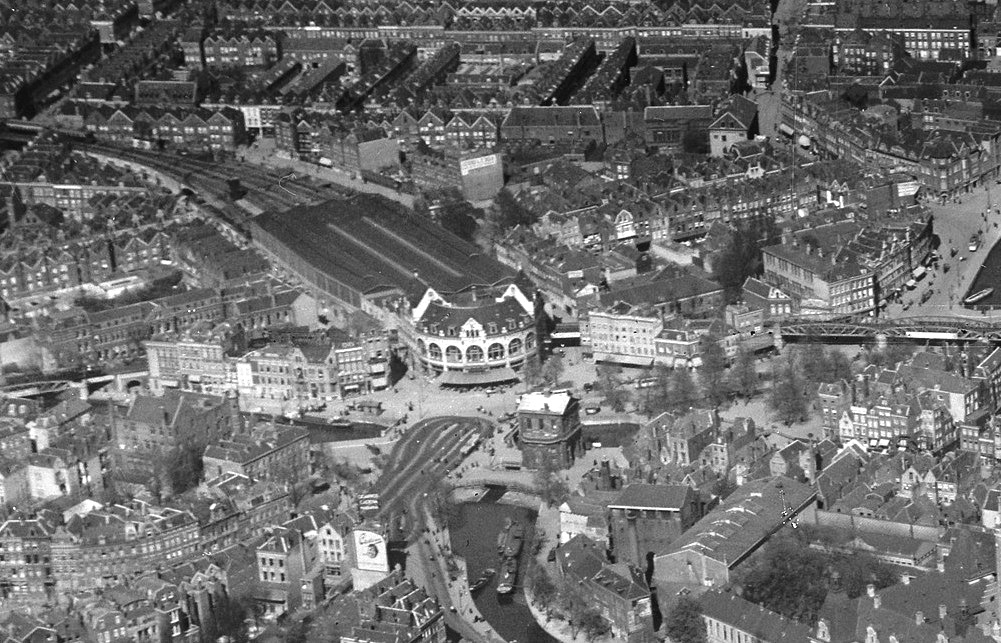
The old station before World War II

Hofplein station was opened on 1 October 1908 by the Zuid-Hollandsche Electrische Spoorweg-Maatschappij. The viaduct (also called the De Hofbogen) was the first major reinforced concrete construction in the Netherlands and is probably the longest (1,9 km) Rijksmonument (since 2002). The station building was destroyed during the Rotterdam Blitz on 14 May 1940, and a new building was opened in 1956, which was demolished for the construction of a railway tunnel between Rotterdam Centraal, Blaak, and Zuid in the early 1990s. When Hofplein station closed on 3 June 2006 for conversion of the Hofpleinlijn to RandstadRail it had one island platform, of which only one side was still in operation.

In 2011, the Hofbogen project office realized the MINI MALL. For this, the first seven arch spaces of the Hofplein Station were renovated and transformed for a new usage. In addition to being the longest building, it could also become the city's longest park. A 'Hofline' after examples like the crowds of tourists who flock to the 2,3 km long High Line in New York City or the 4,7 km long Coulée verte René-Dumont in Paris.

== RandstadRail operation ==
On 10 September 2006 Hofplein re-opened as a temporary RandstadRail station on line E. A new line E tunnel between Melanchthonweg and Rotterdam Centraal opened on 17 August 2010, and Hofplein station was then closed permanently.

=== RandstadRail services ===
The following RandstadRail services called at Hofplein between 2006 and 2010:

Service	Route	Material	Frequency
E	Den Haag Centraal - Laan van NOI - Voorburg 't Loo - Leidschendam-Voorburg - Forepark - Leidschenveen - Nootdorp - Pijnacker Centrum - Pijnacker Zuid - Berkel Westpolder - Rodenrijs - Meijersplein - Melanchthonweg - Rotterdam Hofplein	RET Metro	4 trains per hour Monday - Saturday, every 15 minutes; 2 Sunday and evening, every 30 minutes.

== Gallery ==
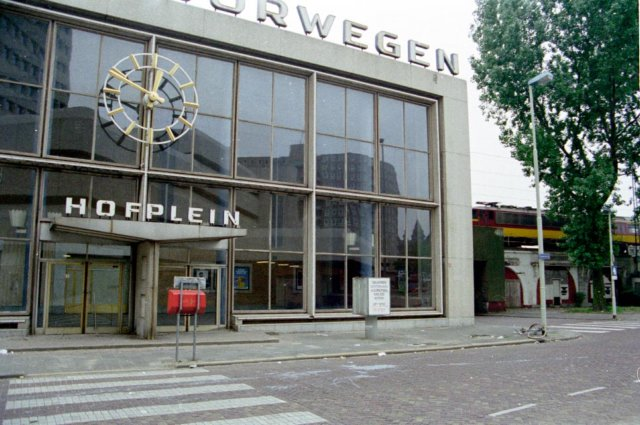
The station building from 1956.

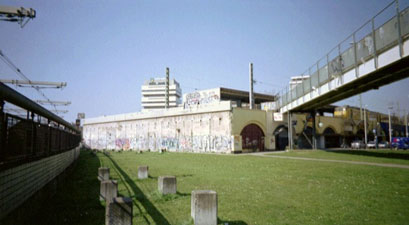
To the very left is the railway line between Rotterdam Centraal and Blaak.

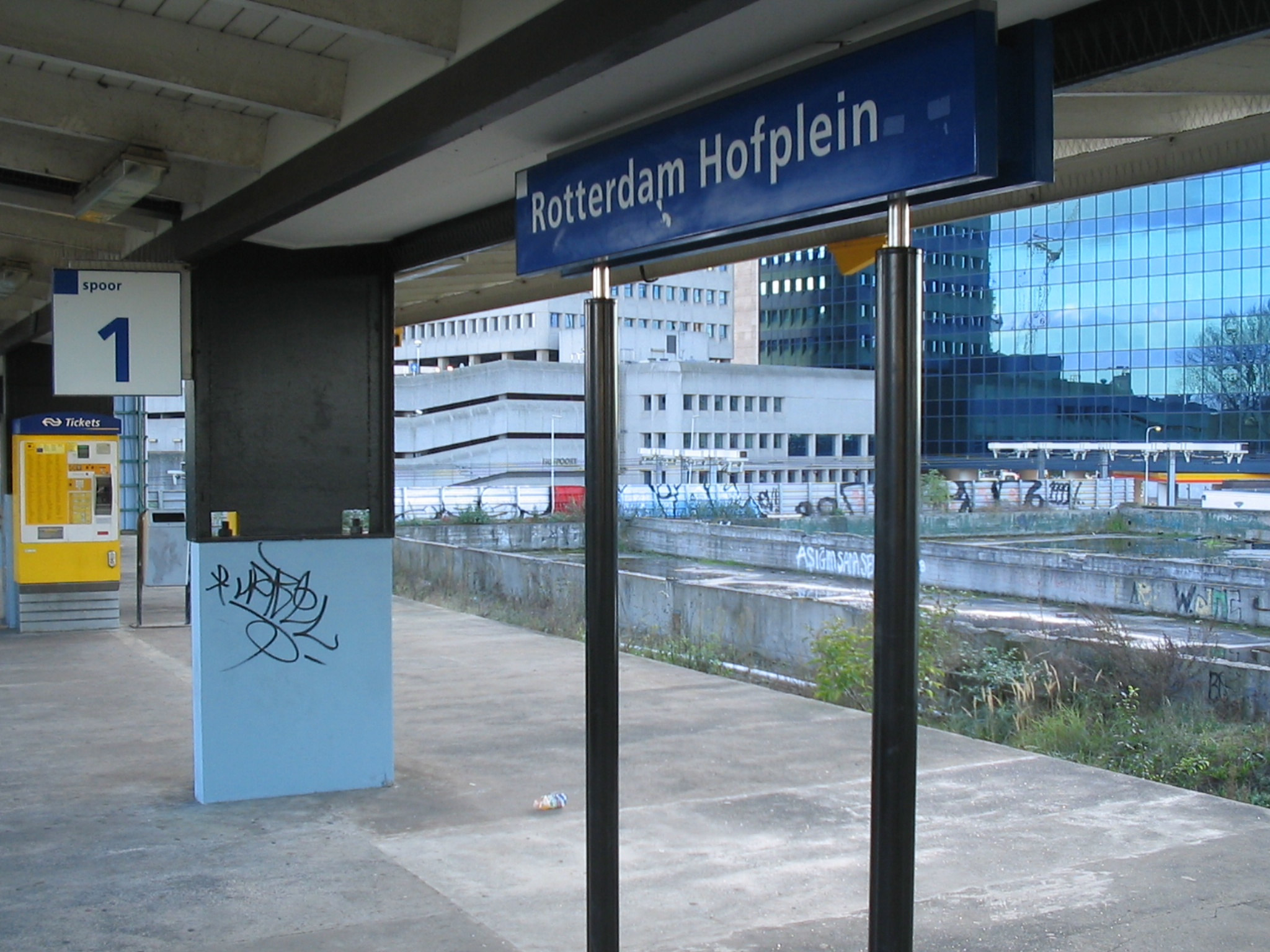
The platform in 2005.

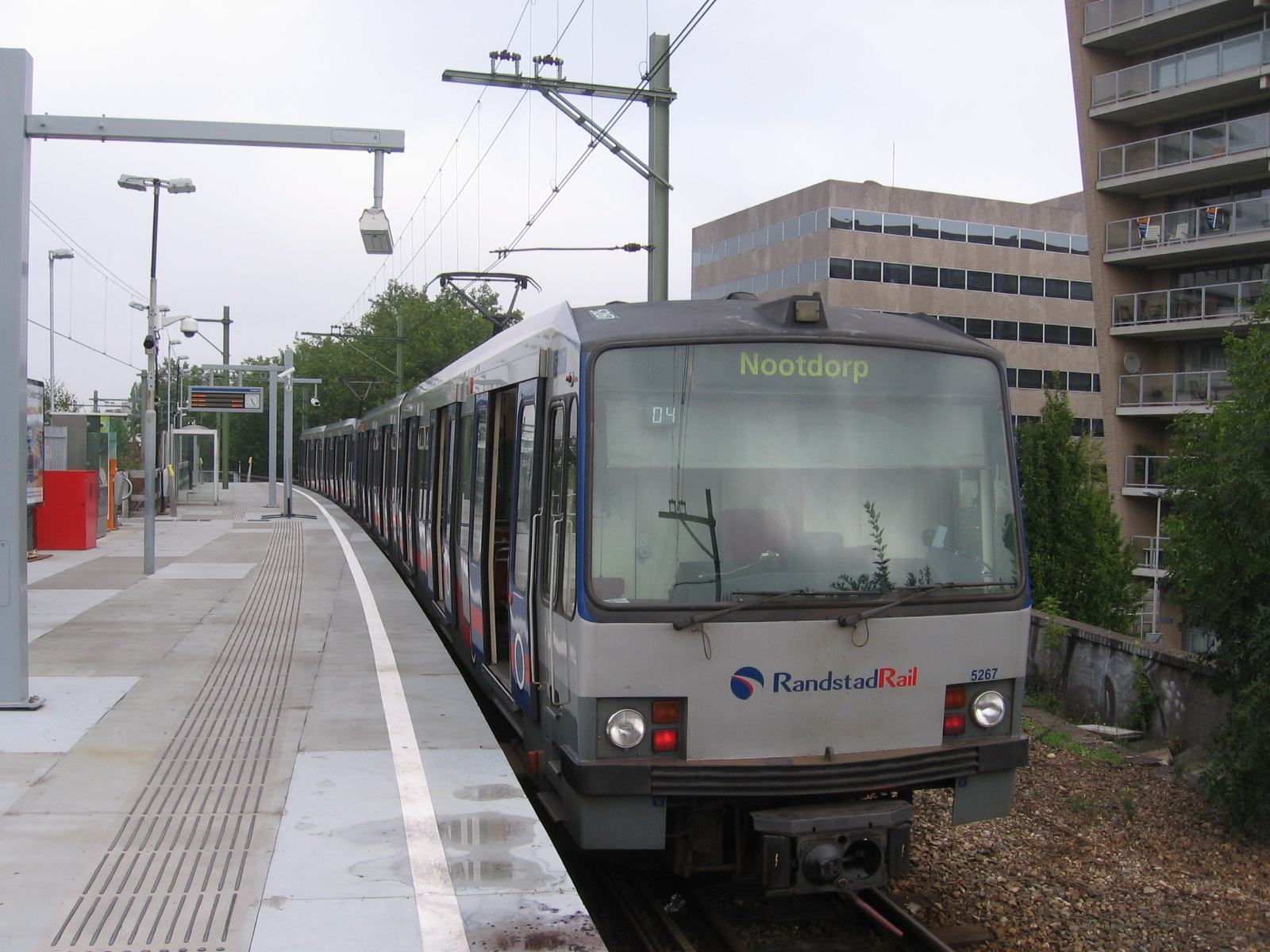
After conversion to RanstadRail with an RET Metro set.
