= Blijdorp RandstadRail station =

Metro station in Rotterdam, Netherlands

Blijdorp
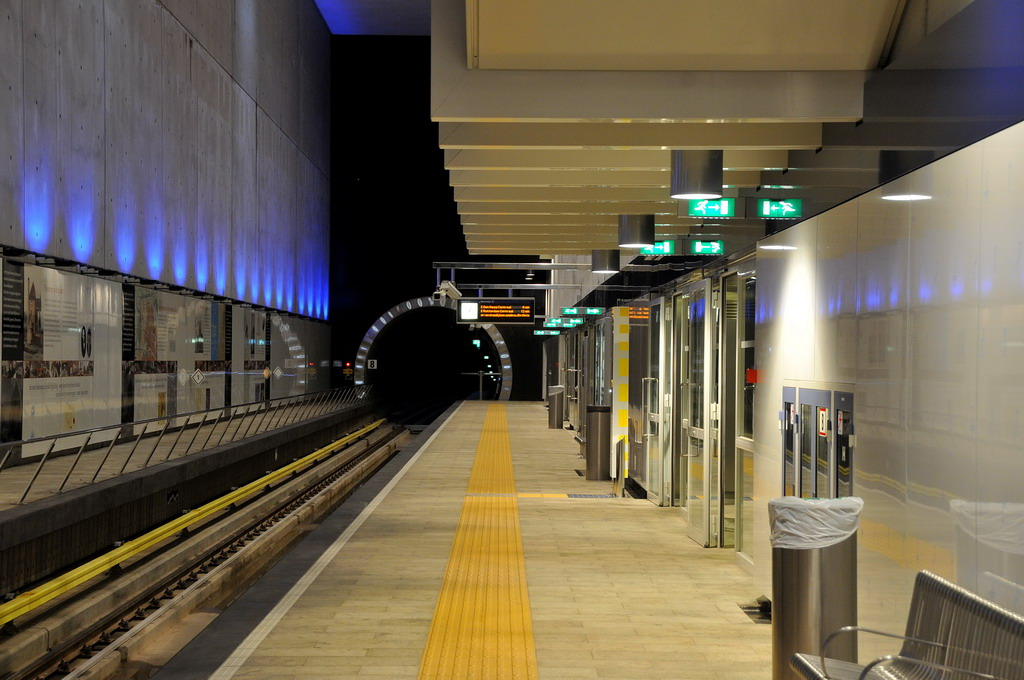

General information
- Location: Netherlands
- Coordinates: 51°55′51″N 4°27′28″E
- Line: E
- Platforms: 2

History
- Opened: 17 August 2010

Services
Preceding station	RandstadRail	Following station
Rotterdam Centraal towards Slinge	Line E (RET)	Melanchthonweg towards Den Haag Centraal
Location
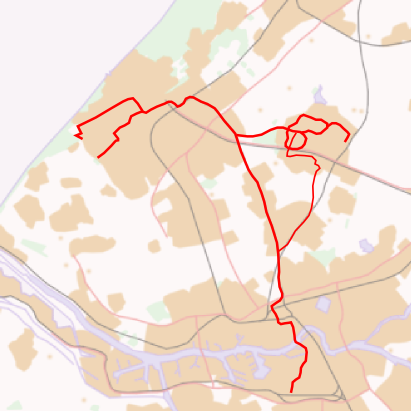
- Location within RandstadRail network

Blijdorp is a metro station, as a part of the Rotterdam metro and the regional light rail system RandstadRail, located in Rotterdam-Blijdorp, the Netherlands.

The station was opened on 17 August 2010, together with the tunnel connecting the metro station of Rotterdam Centraal to the Hofpleinlijn, which is part of the RandstadRail project. Since the station opened, line E trains run from Rotterdam Centraal towards Den Haag Centraal. After approximately one year, in 2011, a connection was established with the existing metro network of Rotterdam, allowing a direct connection between Slinge station and Den Haag Centraal.

On 26 May 2010 a disaster drill was held in this station. In order to make it seem real an old metrocar was destroyed

== Train services ==
The following services currently call at Blijdorp:

Service	Route	Material	Frequency
E	Den Haag Centraal - Laan van NOI - Voorburg 't Loo - Leidschendam-Voorburg - Forepark - Leidschenveen - Nootdorp - Pijnacker Centrum - Pijnacker Zuid - Berkel Westpolder - Rodenrijs - Meijersplein - Melanchthonweg - Blijdorp - Rotterdam Centraal - Stadhuis - Beurs - Leuvehaven - Wilhelminaplein - Rijnhaven - Maashaven - Zuidplein - Slinge	RET Metro	6x per hour (every 10 minutes), evenings and Sundays: 4x per hour (every 15 minutes)
