= Melanchthonweg RandstadRail station =

Metro station in Rotterdam, Netherlands

Melanchthonweg
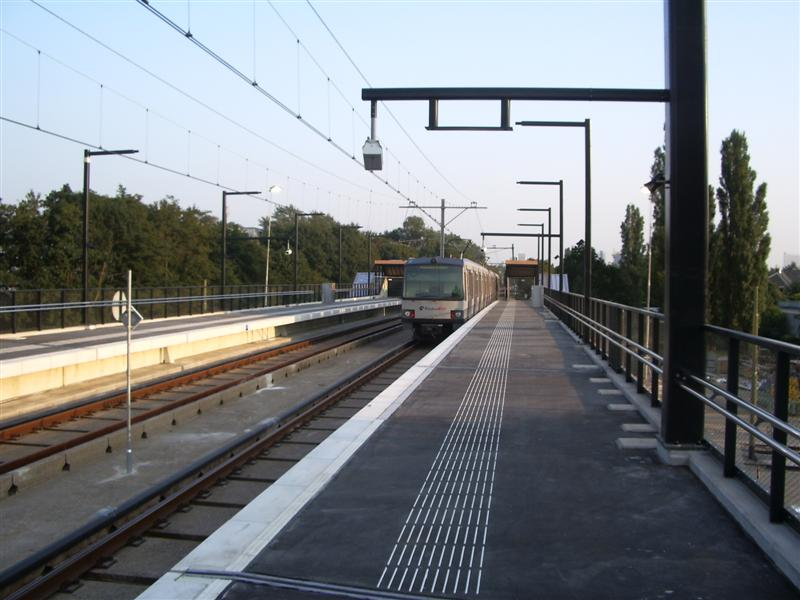
- Melanchthonweg station

General information
- Location: 3045 PN Rotterdam; Hillegersberg-Schiebroek; Netherlands
- Coordinates: 51°56′55″N 4°27′52″E
- Line: E
- Platforms: 2

History
- Opened: 10 September 2006

Services
Preceding station	RandstadRail	Following station
Blijdorp towards Slinge	Line E (RET)	Meijersplein towards Den Haag Centraal
Location
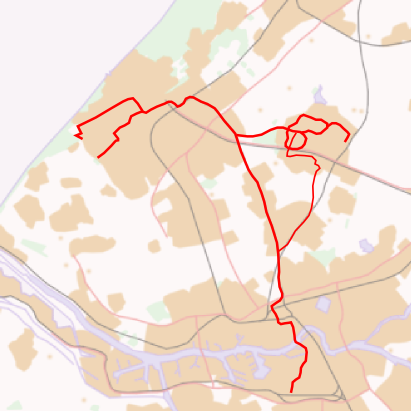
- Location within RandstadRail network

Melanchthonweg is a metro station, as a part of the Rotterdam metro and the regional light rail system RandstadRail, located in Rotterdam, the Netherlands.

== History ==
The RandstadRail station opened on 10 September 2006 for the RET Erasmuslijn metro service, currently line E. It was built to replace the old Rotterdam Kleiweg railway station (Kleiwegkwartier), which was located 300 meters south of the new Melanchthonweg station and was served by trains on the Hofpleinlijn. The station features 2 platforms, that are the same height as the train doors.

Due to a mistake made by the municipality, the street where the station is located is called Melanchtonweg, without the second h. The name of the RandstadRail station does feature this second h.

In 2006 and 2007 the service was operated as a shuttle Rotterdam Hofplein - Nootdorp. Since 17 August 2010, the preceding station is no longer Hofplein, but Blijdorp instead. On this date, the tunnel connecting the existing line to Rotterdam Centraal was opened.

== Train services ==
The following services currently call at Melanchthonweg:

Service	Route	Material	Frequency
E	Den Haag Centraal - Laan van NOI - Voorburg 't Loo - Leidschendam-Voorburg - Forepark - Leidschenveen - Nootdorp - Pijnacker Centrum - Pijnacker Zuid - Berkel Westpolder - Rodenrijs - Meijersplein - Melanchthonweg - Blijdorp - Rotterdam Centraal - Stadhuis - Beurs - Leuvehaven - Wilhelminaplein - Rijnhaven - Maashaven - Zuidplein - Slinge	RET Metro	6x per hour (every 10 minutes), evenings and Sundays: 4x per hour (every 15 minutes)

== Tram and bus services ==
These services, operated by RET, depart from stops underneath the station:

- Tram 25 (Schiebroek - Melanchthonweg RR - Centraal Station NS - Barendrecht-Carnisselande)
- Bus 41 (Rotterdam Noord NS - Melanchthonweg RR - Rotterdam The Hague Airport - Schiedam Centrum NS
