= Leidschendam-Voorburg RandstadRail station =

Railway station in Voorburg, Netherlands

Leidschendam-Voorburg
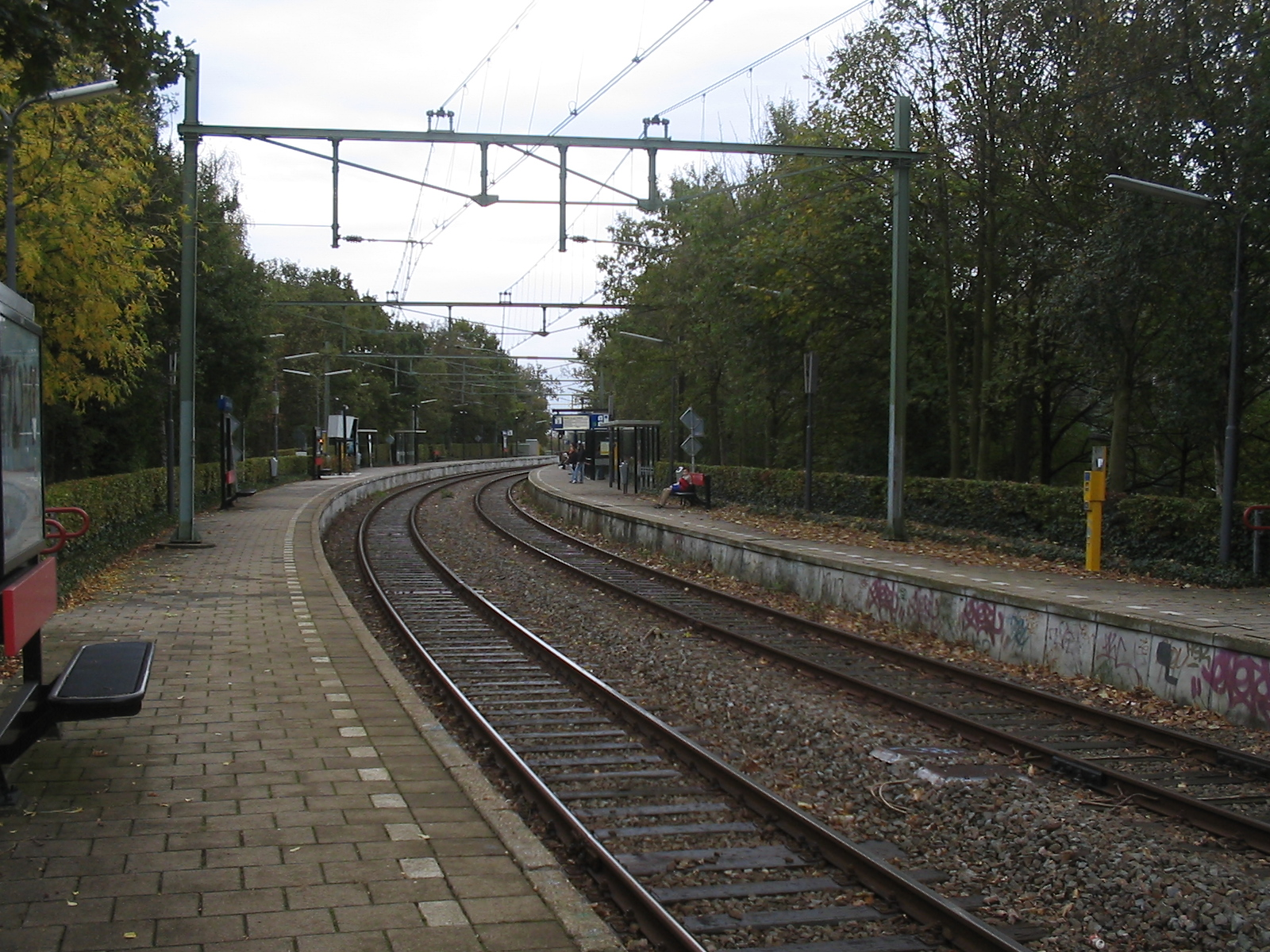

General information
- Location: Netherlands
- Coordinates: 52°04′37″N 4°22′58″E
- Line: E 3 4
- Platforms: 2

History
- Opened: 1 October 1908; 117 years ago, reopened 29 October 2006; 19 years ago
- Closed: 3 June 2006; 20 years ago

Services
Preceding station	RandstadRail	Following station
Forepark towards Slinge	Line E (RET)	Voorburg 't Loo towards Den Haag Centraal
Forepark towards Centrum-West	Line 3 (HTM)	Voorburg 't Loo towards Arnold Spoelplein
Forepark towards Lansingerland-Zoetermeer	Line 4 (HTM)	Voorburg 't Loo towards De Uithof
Location
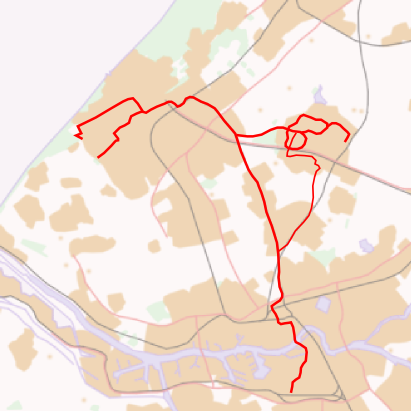
- Location within RandstadRail network

Leidschendam-Voorburg is the RandstadRail station in of Leidschendam-Voorburg, the Netherlands.

== History ==
The station opened, as a railway station, on 1 October 1908 as part of the Hofpleinlijn (Den Haag - Rotterdam Hofplein). From 20 May 1977 the station was also served by services from Den Haag operating on the Zoetermeerlijn, operating Zoetermeer Stadslijn services. The train station closed on 3 June 2006 and reopened as a RandstadRail station on 29 October 2006 for the HTM tram services (3 & 4) and on 11 November 2006 for the RET metro service (line E).

The station features 2 platforms on either side of a viaduct. These have a high and a low platform, with RandstadRail 3 and RandstadRail 4 using the lower platforms, and line E using the higher platforms.

Close to the station, but on the opposite side of the Rijn-Schiekanaal, is Leidschendam NedTrain depot. Trains used to access this depot along this line, but when the line was converted to RandstadRail, the Nootdorp Boog was built, coming off the Den Haag - Gouda railway line, and NS trains run parallel to the RandstadRail line between the split between the Hofpleinlijn and the Zoetermeerlijn and Leidschendam Depot.

== Train services ==
The following services currently call at Leidschendam-Voorburg:

Service	Route	Material	Frequency
RR3	Arnold Spoelplein - Pisuissestraat - Mozartlaan - Heliotrooplaan - Muurbloemweg - Hoefbladlaan - De Savornin Lohmanplein - Appelstraat - Zonnebloemstraat - Azaleaplein - Goudenregenstraat - Fahrenheitstraat - Valkenbosplein - Conradkade - Van Speijkstraat - Elandstraat - MCH Westeinde - Brouwersgracht - Grote Markt - Spui - Den Haag Centraal - Beatrixkwartier - Laan van NOI - Voorburg 't Loo - Leidschendam-Voorburg - Forepark - Leidschenveen - Voorweg (Low Level) - Centrum West - Stadhuis - Palenstein - Seghwaert - Leidsewallen - De Leyens - Buytenwegh - Voorweg (High Level) - Meerzicht - Driemanspolder - Delftsewallen - Dorp - Centrum West	HTM RegioCidatis Tram	6x per hour (Monday - Saturday, Every 10 Minutes), 5x per hour (Sundays, Every 12 Minutes), 4x per hour (Evenings, after 8pm, Every 15 Minutes)
RR4	De Uithof - Beresteinaan - Bouwlustlaan - De Rade - Dedemsvaart - Zuidwoldepad - Leyenburg - Monnickendamplein - Tienhovenselaan - Dierenselaan - De La Reyweg - Monstersestraat - MCH Westeinde - Brouwersgracht - Grote Markt - Spui - Den Haag Centraal - Beatrixkwartier - Laan van NOI - Voorburg 't Loo - Leidschendam-Voorburg - Forepark - Leidschenveen - Voorweg (Low Level) - Centrum West - Stadhuis - Palenstein - Seghwaert - Willem Dreeslaan - Oosterheem - Javalaan	HTM RegioCitadis Tram	6x per hour (Monday - Saturday, Every 10 Minutes), 5x per hour (Sundays, Every 12 Minutes), 4x per hour (Evenings, after 8pm, Every 15 Minutes)
E	Den Haag Centraal - Laan van NOI - Voorburg 't Loo - Leidschendam-Voorburg - Forepark - Leidschenveen - Nootdorp - Pijnacker Centrum - Pijnacker Zuid - Berkel Westpolder - Rodenrijs - Meijersplein - Melanchthonweg - Blijdorp - Rotterdam Centraal - Stadhuis - Beurs - Leuvehaven - Wilhelminaplein - Rijnhaven - Maashaven - Zuidplein - Slinge	RET Metro	6x per hour (every 10 minutes), evenings and Sundays: 4x per hour (every 15 minutes)

== Bus service ==
These services departs from street level, to the west of the station.

- Bus 46 (Station Voorschoten - Leidschendam - Station Leidschendam-Voorburg - Station Voorburg - Den Haag Centraal)
- Bus 45 (Station Leiden Centraal - Station Leiden Lammenschans - Voorschoten - Leidschendam - Station Leidschendam-Voorburg - Station Voorburg - Den Haag Centraal)
