= Meijersplein / Airport RandstadRail station =

Metro station in Rotterdam, Netherlands

Meijersplein / Airport
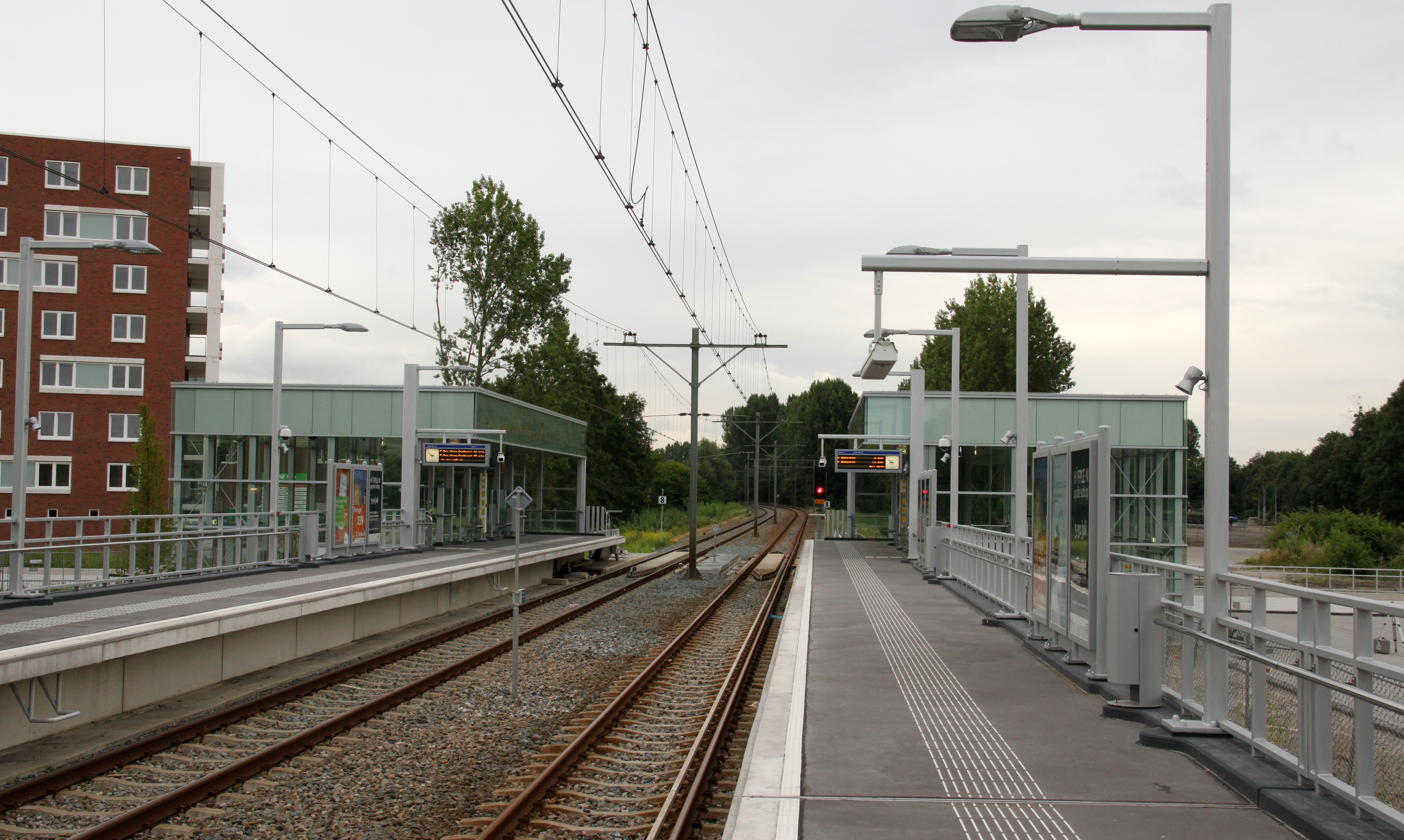

General information
- Location: Netherlands
- Coordinates: 51°57′22″N 4°27′44″E
- Line: E
- Platforms: 2

History
- Opened: 17 May 2010

Services
Preceding station	RandstadRail	Following station
Melanchthonweg towards Slinge	Line E (RET)	Rodenrijs towards Den Haag Centraal
Location
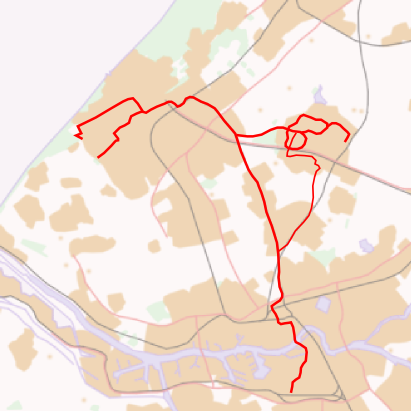
- Location within RandstadRail network

Meijersplein / Airport is a metro station, as a part of the Rotterdam metro and the regional light rail system RandstadRail, located in Schiebroek, a borough of Rotterdam, the Netherlands.

== History ==
Construction of Meijersplein station began in January 2008. The station was built to replace Wilgenplas station, located approximately 500 meters (1,600 ft) north. Wilgenplas was served by railway trains on the Hofplein line before that line was converted for use by metro trains and the station was temporarily kept in service after this conversion took place in 2006.

In May 2010 construction of Meijersplein station completed and Wilgenplas station was duly closed down on 12 May. Meijersplein station was opened on 17 May and it is now being served by metro trains of line E. It has an Airport Shuttle service to and from Rotterdam The Hague Airport. In 2020 a tender was issued for autonomous vehicles for this shuttle service.

== Train services ==
The following services call at Meijersplein:

Service	Route	Material	Frequency
E	Den Haag Centraal - Laan van NOI - Voorburg 't Loo - Leidschendam-Voorburg - Forepark - Leidschenveen - Nootdorp - Pijnacker Centrum - Pijnacker Zuid - Berkel Westpolder - Rodenrijs - Meijersplein - Melanchthonweg - Blijdorp - Rotterdam Centraal - Stadhuis - Beurs - Leuvehaven - Wilhelminaplein - Rijnhaven - Maashaven - Zuidplein - Slinge	RET Metro	6x per hour (every 10 minutes), evenings and Sundays: 4x per hour (every 15 minutes)

== Bus services ==
- 33 (RET) Meijersplein - Rotterdam-The Hague Airport - Overschie - Rotterdam Centraal
