= Rodenrijs RandstadRail station =

Metro station in Rodenrijs, Netherlands

Rodenrijs
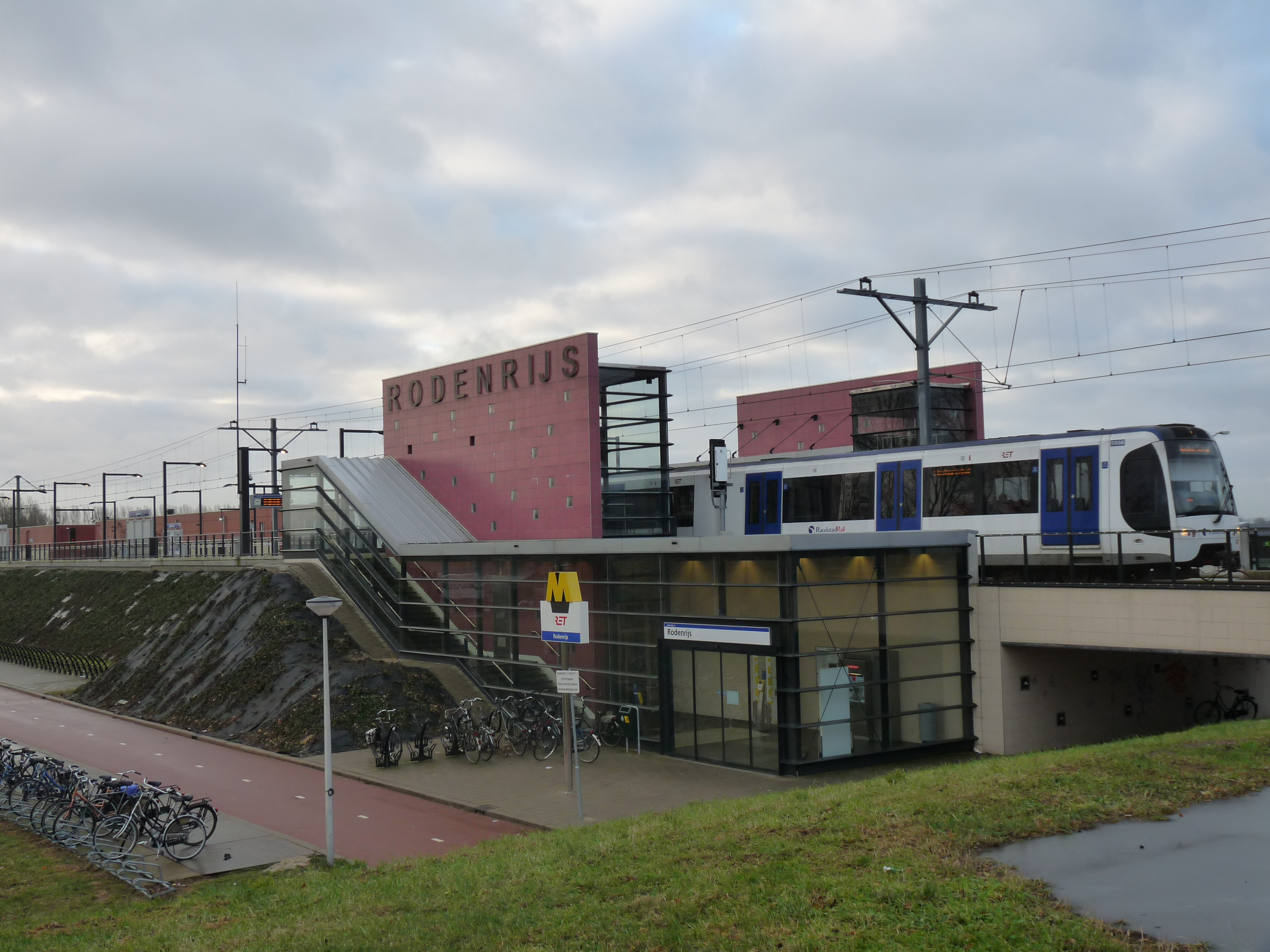
- The railway station after conversion to RandstadRail

General information
- Location: Netherlands
- Coordinates: 51°58′34″N 4°27′39″E
- Line: E
- Platforms: 2

History
- Opened: 1 October 1908, reopened 10 September 2006
- Closed: 3 June 2006

Services
Preceding station	RandstadRail	Following station
Meijersplein towards Slinge	Line E (RET)	Berkel Westpolder towards Den Haag Centraal
Location
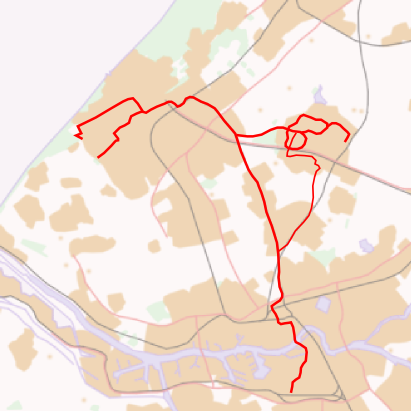
- Location within RandstadRail network

Rodenrijs is a metro station, as a part of the Rotterdam metro and the regional light rail system RandstadRail, located in Rodenrijs, the Netherlands.

== History ==
The railway station opened here on 1 October 1908 as part of the Hofpleinlijn. As the nearby station Berkel was closed in 1965, the name of the Rodenrijs station was changed into Berkel en Rodenrijs. This station was closed on 3 June 2006 for refurbishment work to a RandstadRail metro station.

The RandstadRail station opened on 10 September 2006 for the RET Erasmuslijn metro service, currently line E, now under the name of Rodenrijs again, as at the same time the new station Berkel Westpolder was opened. The station features 2 platforms, that are the same height as the train doors.

In 2006 and 2007 the service was operated as a shuttle Rotterdam Hofplein - Nootdorp. The station lies in the south west of Rodenrijs. As of 2008 the service was after Nootdorp extended to The Hague Central station. In 2010 the route on the Rotterdam side changed to Rotterdam Central and in 2011 to Rotterdam Slinge.

Ten years after its opening, Rodenrijs station had a facelift. Waiting areas for passengers and parking spaces for bicycles were improved.

== Train services ==
The following services currently call at Rodenrijs:

Service	Route	Material	Frequency
E	Den Haag Centraal - Laan van NOI - Voorburg 't Loo - Leidschendam-Voorburg - Forepark - Leidschenveen - Nootdorp - Pijnacker Centrum - Pijnacker Zuid - Berkel Westpolder - Rodenrijs - Meijersplein - Melanchthonweg - Blijdorp - Rotterdam Centraal - Stadhuis - Beurs - Leuvehaven - Wilhelminaplein - Rijnhaven - Maashaven - Zuidplein - Slinge	RET Metro	6x per hour (every 10 minutes), evenings and Sundays: 4x per hour (every 15 minutes)

== Bus services ==
These services depart from near the station, on the Oostlaan:

- 172 (Rodenrijs Town Service (Anticlockwise) - Rodenrijs RR - Berkel en Rodenrijs - Bergschenhoek - Rodenrijs RR) (operated by Qbuzz)
- 174 (Rodenrijs Town Service (Clockwise) - Rodenrijs RR - Bergschenhoek - Berkel en Rodenrijs - Rodenrijs RR) (operated by Qbuzz)
