= Pijnacker Zuid RandstadRail station =

Metro station in Pijnacker-Nootdorp, Netherlands

Pijnacker Zuid
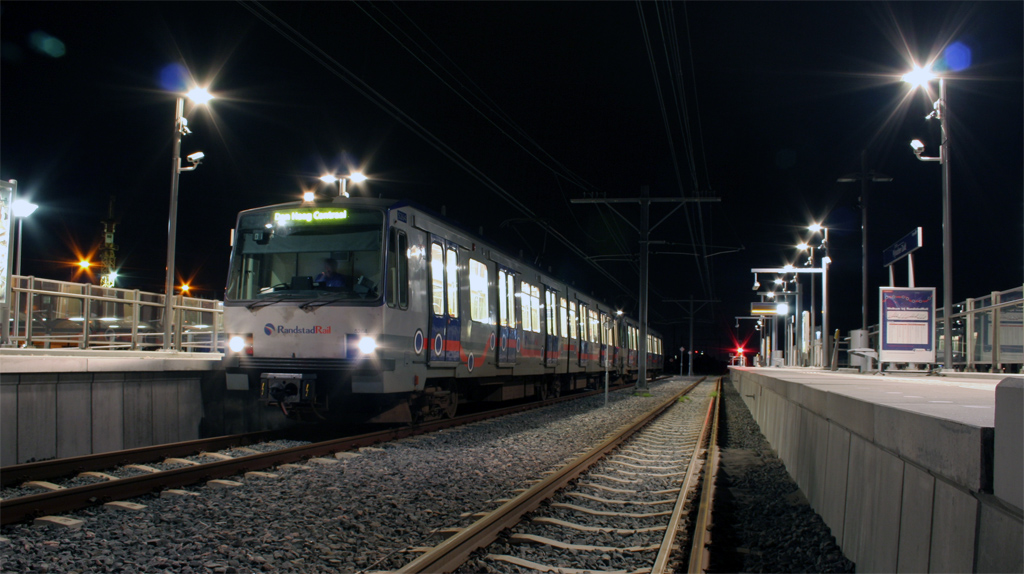

General information
- Location: Netherlands
- Coordinates: 52°00′17″N 4°26′47″E
- Line: E
- Platforms: 2

History
- Opened: 10 Sep 2006

Services
Preceding station	RandstadRail	Following station
Berkel Westpolder towards Slinge	Line E (RET)	Pijnacker Centrum towards Den Haag Centraal
Location
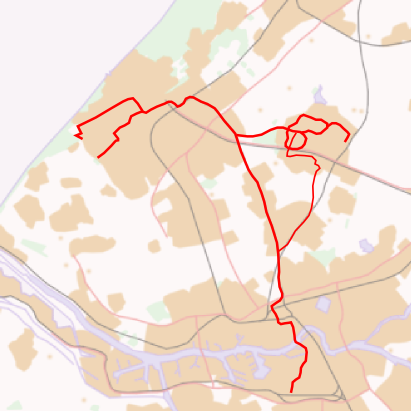
- Location within RandstadRail network

Pijnacker Zuid is a RandstadRail station located in Pijnacker, the Netherlands.

== History ==
The RandstadRail station opened on 10 September 2006 for the RET Erasmuslijn metro service, currently line E. The station features 2 platforms, that are the same height as the train doors.

In 2006 and 2007 the service was operated as a shuttle Rotterdam Hofplein - Nootdorp. The station lies in the very south of Pijnacker, near a new housing development, Klapwijk where there will be 3400 new homes. In 2022 a new housing development next to Pijnacker Zuid station was announced with 330 homes.

In 2020 a new turning track was built just south of Pijnacker Zuid. This enabled RET to extend metro line D to Pijnacker Zuid during peak hours.

== Train services ==
The following services currently call at Pijnacker Zuid:

Service	Route	Material	Frequency
E	Den Haag Centraal - Laan van NOI - Voorburg 't Loo - Leidschendam-Voorburg - Forepark - Leidschenveen - Nootdorp - Pijnacker Centrum - Pijnacker Zuid - Berkel Westpolder - Rodenrijs - Meijersplein - Melanchthonweg - Blijdorp - Rotterdam Centraal - Stadhuis - Beurs - Leuvehaven - Wilhelminaplein - Rijnhaven - Maashaven - Zuidplein - Slinge	RET Metro	6x per hour (every 10 minutes), evenings and Sundays: 4x per hour (every 15 minutes)

== Bus services ==
These services depart from near the station, at the bus stop Ade on the N472, by the roundabout:

- 171 (Pijnacker Centrum RR - Pijnacker South - Rodenrijs - Rotterdam Centraal NS) (operated by Qbuzz)
- 176 (Pijnacker Centrum RR - Pijnacker South - Rodenrijs - Bergschenhoek - Hillegersberg - Rotterdam Alexander NS) (operated by Qbuzz)
- 484 (Pijnacker Buurtbus - Pijnacker - Delft East)
