= Pijnacker Centrum RandstadRail station =

Metro station in Pijnacker-Nootdorp, Netherlands

Pijnacker Centrum
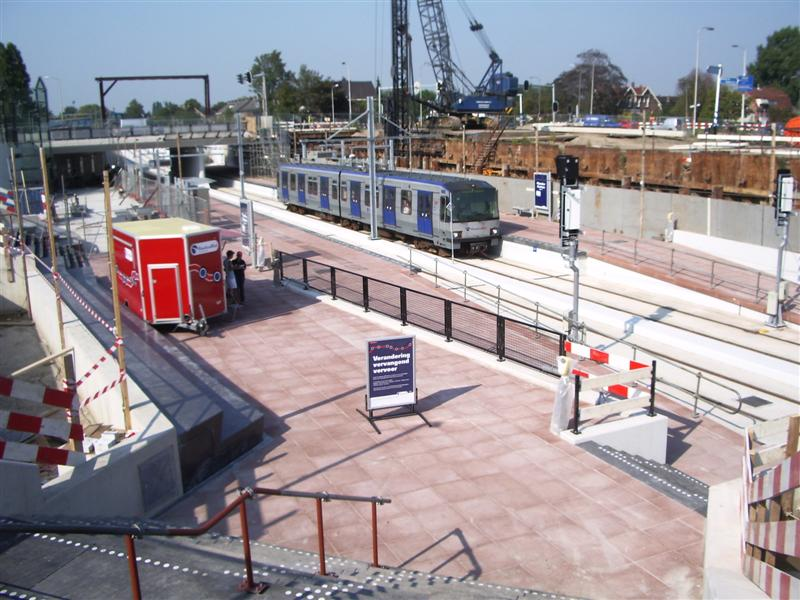
- Pijnacker Centrum RandstadRail station in 2006

General information
- Location: Netherlands
- Coordinates: 52°01′13″N 4°26′16″E
- Line: E
- Platforms: 2

History
- Opened: 1 October 1908, reopened 10 September 2006
- Closed: 3 June 2006

Services
Preceding station	RandstadRail	Following station
Pijnacker Zuid towards Slinge	Line E (RET)	Nootdorp towards Den Haag Centraal
Location
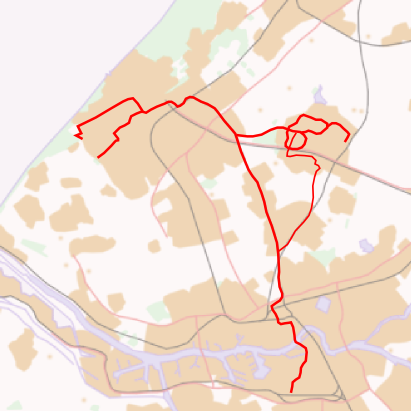
- Location within RandstadRail network

Pijnacker Centrum is a RandstadRail station located in Pijnacker, the Netherlands.

== History ==
The railway station opened here on 1 October 1908 as part of the Hofpleinlijn. This station was closed on 3 June 2006 for conversion to a RandstadRail metro station.

The RandstadRail station opened on 10 September 2006 for the RET Erasmuslijn metro service, currently line E. The station features 2 platforms, that are the same height as the train doors.

In 2006 and 2007 the service was operated as a shuttle Rotterdam Hofplein - Nootdorp. The station lies in the centre of Pijnacker, near the Oostlaan.

In 2017 a pilot project was proposed to have a night-time metro service from Rotterdam to Pijnacker. The municipal council rejected the stop at Pijnacker-Centrum station for the night service because of noise pollution.

== Train services ==
The following services currently call at Pijnacker Centrum:

Service	Route	Material	Frequency
E	Den Haag Centraal - Laan van NOI - Voorburg 't Loo - Leidschendam-Voorburg - Forepark - Leidschenveen - Nootdorp - Pijnacker Centrum - Pijnacker Zuid - Berkel Westpolder - Rodenrijs - Meijersplein - Melanchthonweg - Blijdorp - Rotterdam Centraal - Stadhuis - Beurs - Leuvehaven - Wilhelminaplein - Rijnhaven - Maashaven - Zuidplein - Slinge	RET Metro	6x per hour (every 10 minutes), evenings and Sundays: 4x per hour (every 15 minutes)

== Bus service ==
These service departs from near the station, on the Oostlaan, one level higher than the station:

- 455 (Zoetermeer Centrum West - Zoetermeer NS - Pijnacker Centrum - Delfgauw - Delft University - Delft NS) (operated by RNET)

== Gallery ==
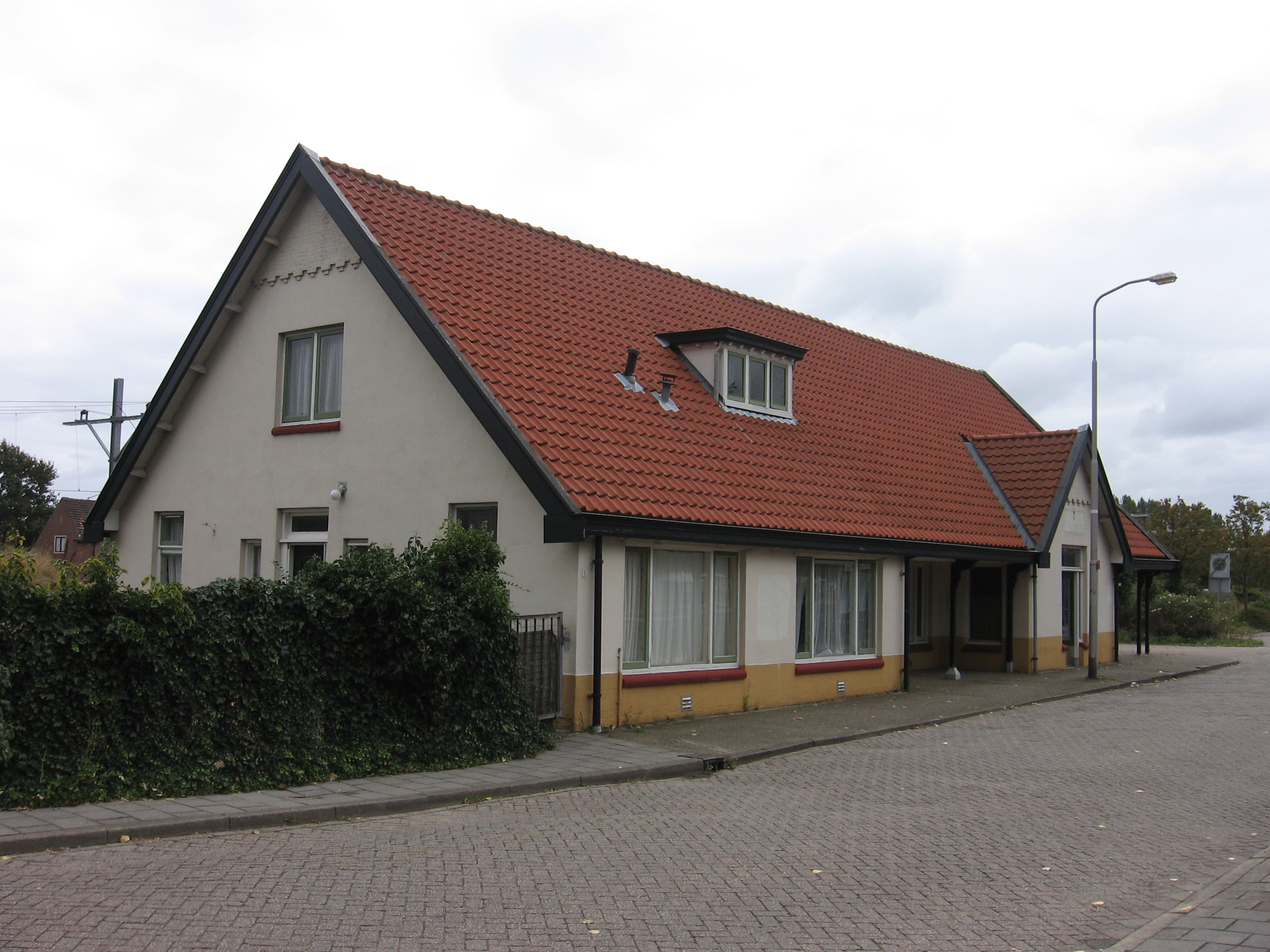
The old station building.

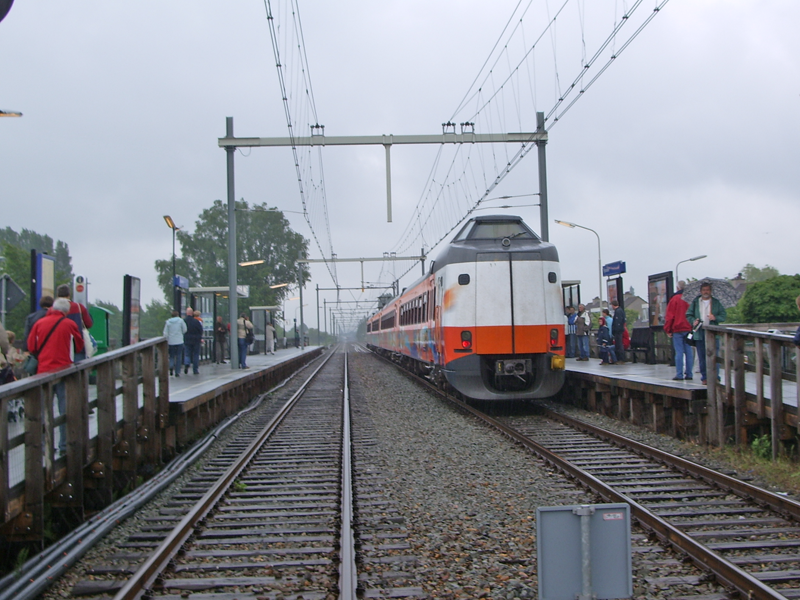
An Olympic ICM train set at the temporary station in May 2006.
