= Leidschenveen RandstadRail station =

Railway station in The Hague, Netherlands

Leidschenveen
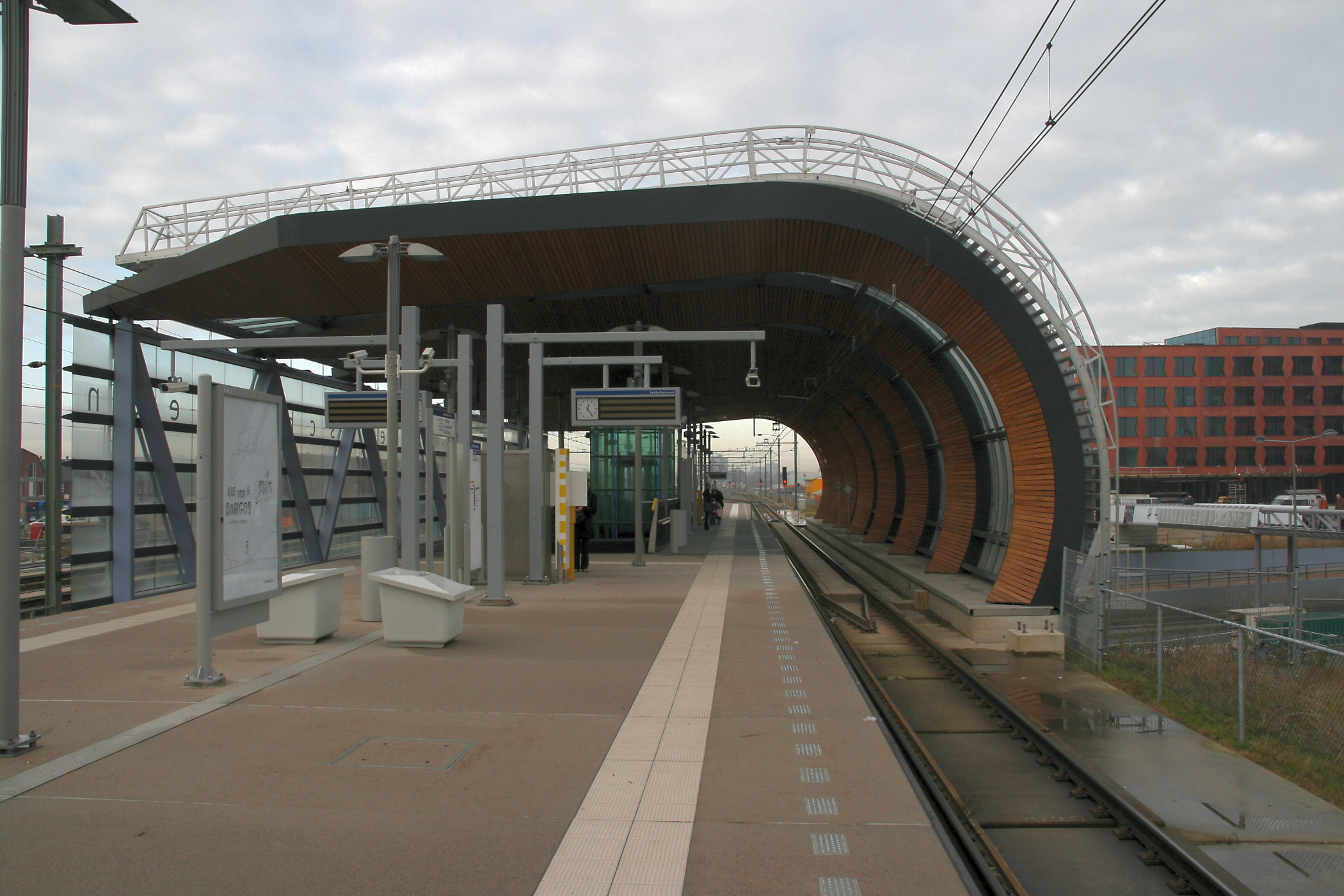
- The station's platform

General information
- Location: Netherlands
- Coordinates: 52°03′53″N 4°24′00″E
- Line: E 3 4
- Platforms: 2

History
- Opened: 29 October 2006; 19 years ago

Services
Preceding station	RandstadRail	Following station
Nootdorp towards Slinge	Line E (RET)	Forepark towards Den Haag Centraal
Voorweg towards Centrum-West	Line 3 (HTM)	Forepark towards Arnold Spoelplein
Voorweg towards Lansingerland-Zoetermeer	Line 4 (HTM)	Forepark towards De Uithof
Location
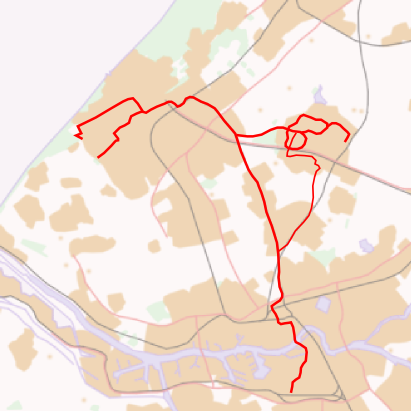
- Location within RandstadRail network

Leidschenveen is the RandstadRail station in the centre of Leidschenveen in the neighbourhood Leidschenveen-Ypenburg in The Hague, Netherlands. The station features 2 platforms on a viaduct. These have a high and a low platform, with tram lines RandstadRail 3 and RandstadRail 4 using the lower platforms, and metro line E using the higher platforms. Leidschenveen is the station where the metro and the tram lines split, with the metro (line E) continuing to Rotterdam, while the trams (3 & 4) continue to Zoetermeer.

== History ==
Leidschenveen opened as a RandstadRail station on 29 October 2006 for the HTM tram services (4) and for the RET metro service (line E), and on 20 October 2007 for tram service 3. In 2014 a pilot study focused on means to reduce litter, prompting measures that improved the perception of cleanliness. Neighbourhood organizations complained in 2020 about safety issues related to loitering teens.

== Train services ==
The following services currently call at Leidschenveen:

Service	Route	Material	Frequency
RR3	Arnold Spoelplein - Pisuissestraat - Mozartlaan - Heliotrooplaan - Muurbloemweg - Hoefbladlaan - De Savornin Lohmanplein - Appelstraat - Zonnebloemstraat - Azaleaplein - Goudenregenstraat - Fahrenheitstraat - Valkenbosplein - Conradkade - Van Speijkstraat - Elandstraat - MCH Westeinde - Brouwersgracht - Grote Markt - Spui - Den Haag Centraal - Beatrixkwartier - Laan van NOI - Voorburg 't Loo - Leidschendam-Voorburg - Forepark - Leidschenveen - Voorweg (Low Level) - Centrum West - Stadhuis - Palenstein - Seghwaert - Leidsewallen - De Leyens - Buytenwegh - Voorweg (High Level) - Meerzicht - Driemanspolder - Delftsewallen - Dorp - Centrum West	HTM RegioCidatis Tram	6x per hour (Monday - Saturday, Every 10 Minutes), 5x per hour (Sundays, Every 12 Minutes), 4x per hour (Evenings, after 8pm, Every 15 Minutes)
RR4	De Uithof - Beresteinaan - Bouwlustlaan - De Rade - Dedemsvaart - Zuidwoldepad - Leyenburg - Monnickendamplein - Tienhovenselaan - Dierenselaan - De La Reyweg - Monstersestraat - MCH Westeinde - Brouwersgracht - Grote Markt - Spui - Den Haag Centraal - Beatrixkwartier - Laan van NOI - Voorburg 't Loo - Leidschendam-Voorburg - Forepark - Leidschenveen - Voorweg (Low Level) - Centrum West - Stadhuis - Palenstein - Seghwaert - Willem Dreeslaan - Oosterheem - Javalaan	HTM RegioCitadis Tram	6x per hour (Monday - Saturday, Every 10 Minutes), 5x per hour (Sundays, Every 12 Minutes), 4x per hour (Evenings, after 8pm, Every 15 Minutes)
E	Den Haag Centraal - Laan van NOI - Voorburg 't Loo - Leidschendam-Voorburg - Forepark - Leidschenveen - Nootdorp - Pijnacker Centrum - Pijnacker Zuid - Berkel Westpolder - Rodenrijs - Meijersplein - Melanchthonweg - Blijdorp - Rotterdam Centraal - Stadhuis - Beurs - Leuvehaven - Wilhelminaplein - Rijnhaven - Maashaven - Zuidplein - Slinge	RET Metro	6x per hour (every 10 minutes), 4x per hour (every 15 minutes) in evenings and on Sundays

== Tram and bus services ==
These services depart from street level, directly below the station.

- Tram 19 (Leidschendam - Station Leidschenveen - Station Ypenburg - Ypenburg - Delft - Station Delft - Delft University)
- Bus 33 (Leidschenveen - Station Leidschenveen - Station Ypenburg - Ypenburg - Rijswijk - Station Rijswijk - Rijswijk De Schilp)

== Gallery ==
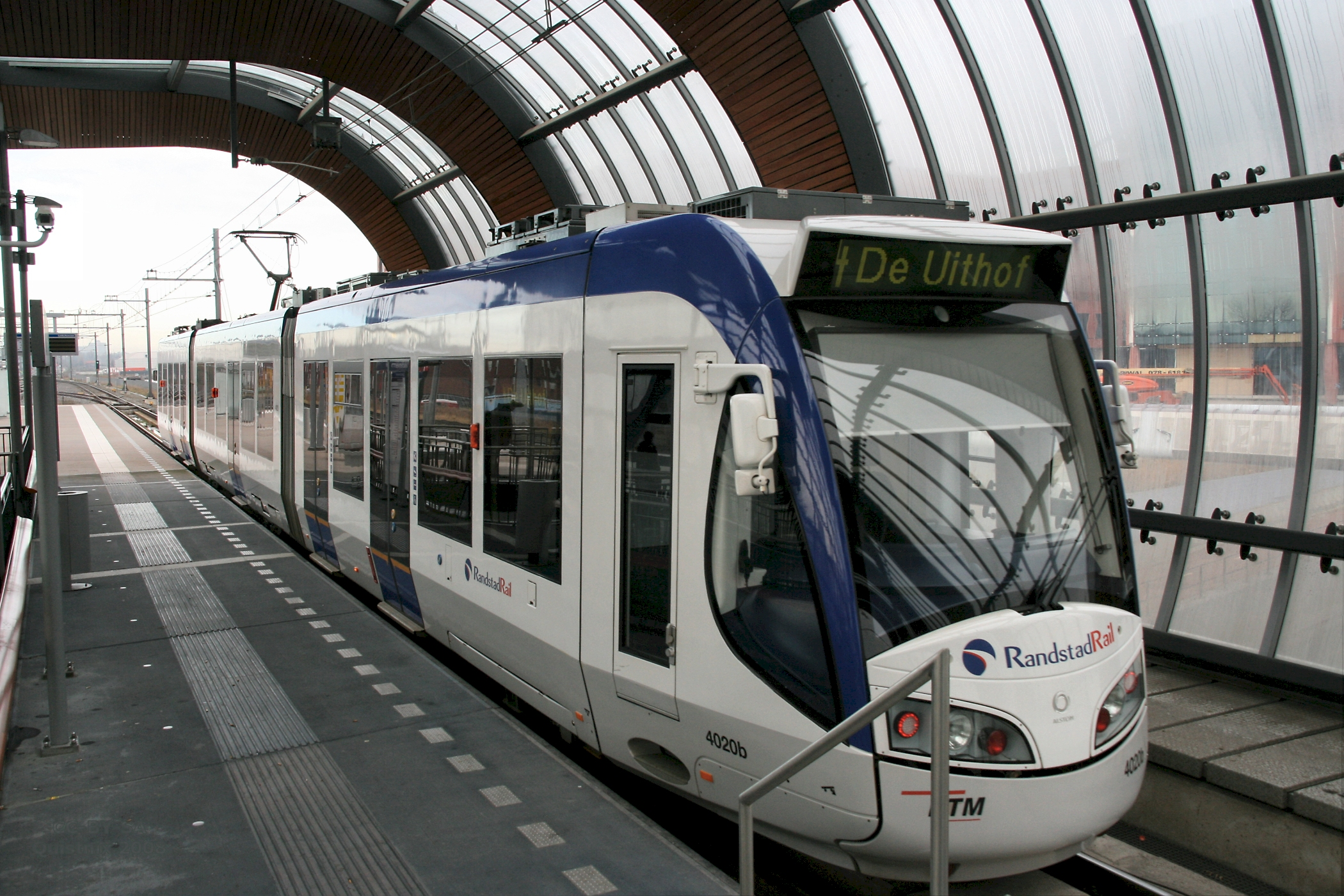
An RR4 Tram at Leidschenveen, leaving the Tram Platforms.

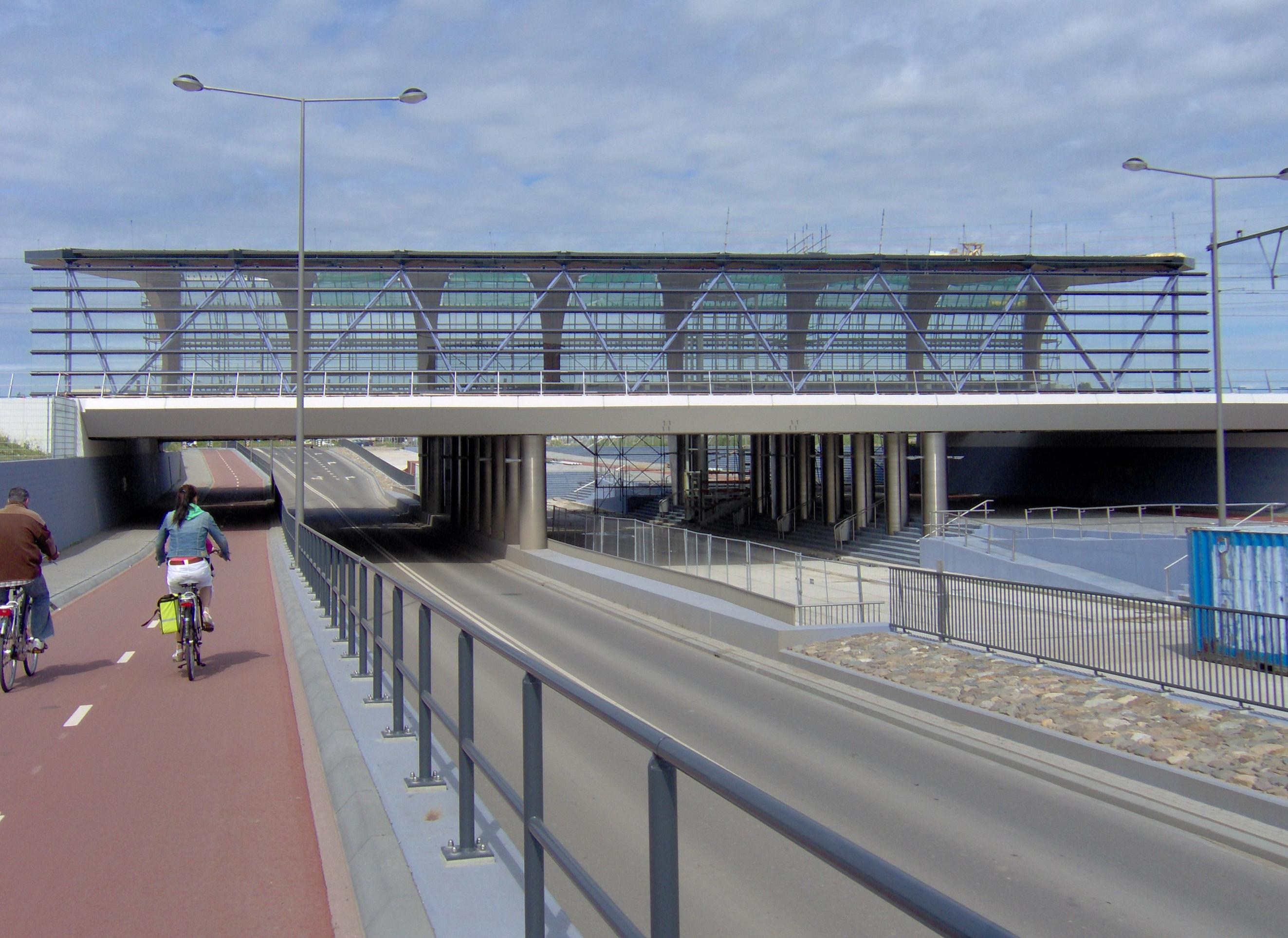
Leidschenveen Station, before completion.

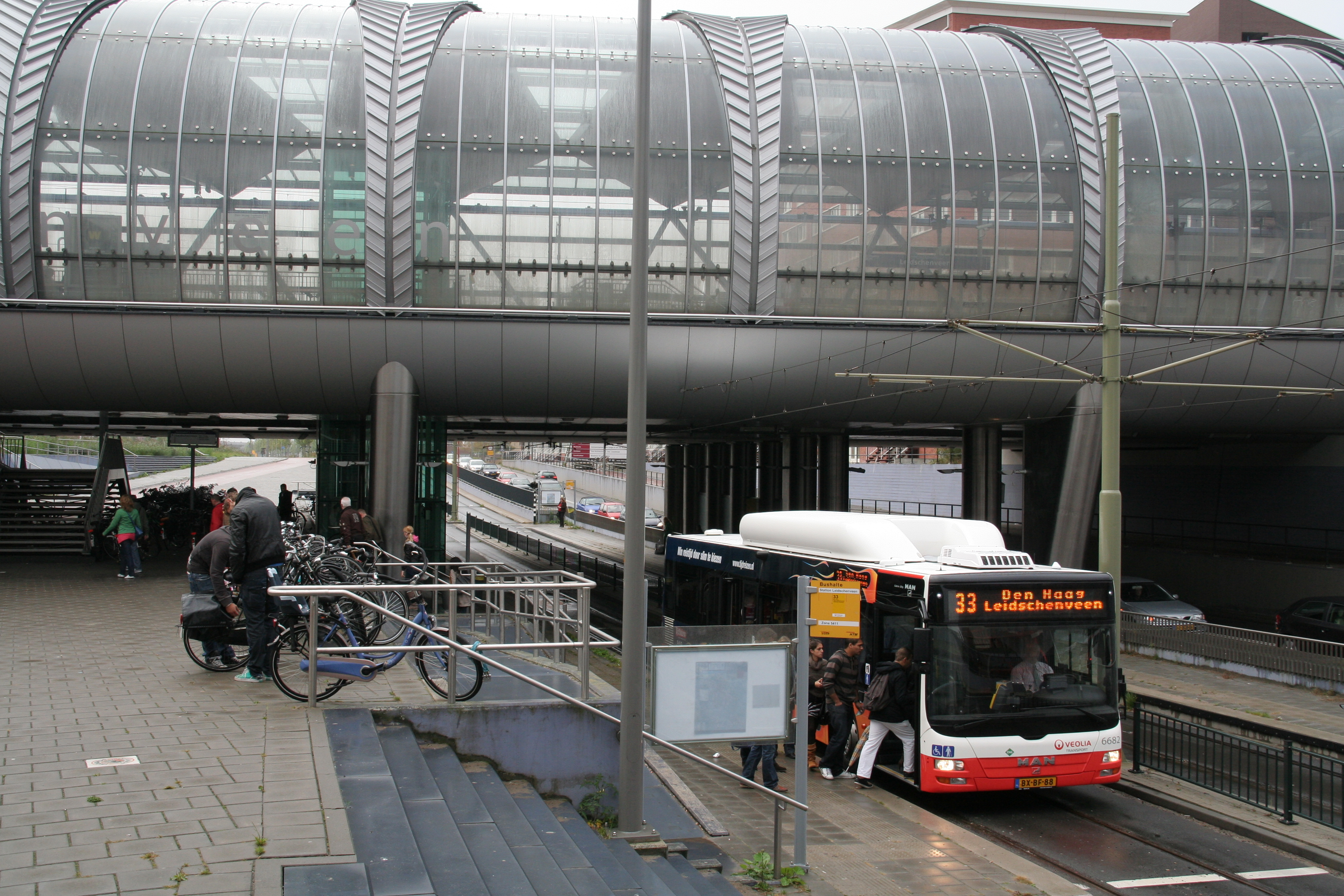
Leidschenveen Station, with a service 33 at the stop. The tram tracks have already been built for tram 19, which started in 2009.
