= Forepark RandstadRail station =

Forepark
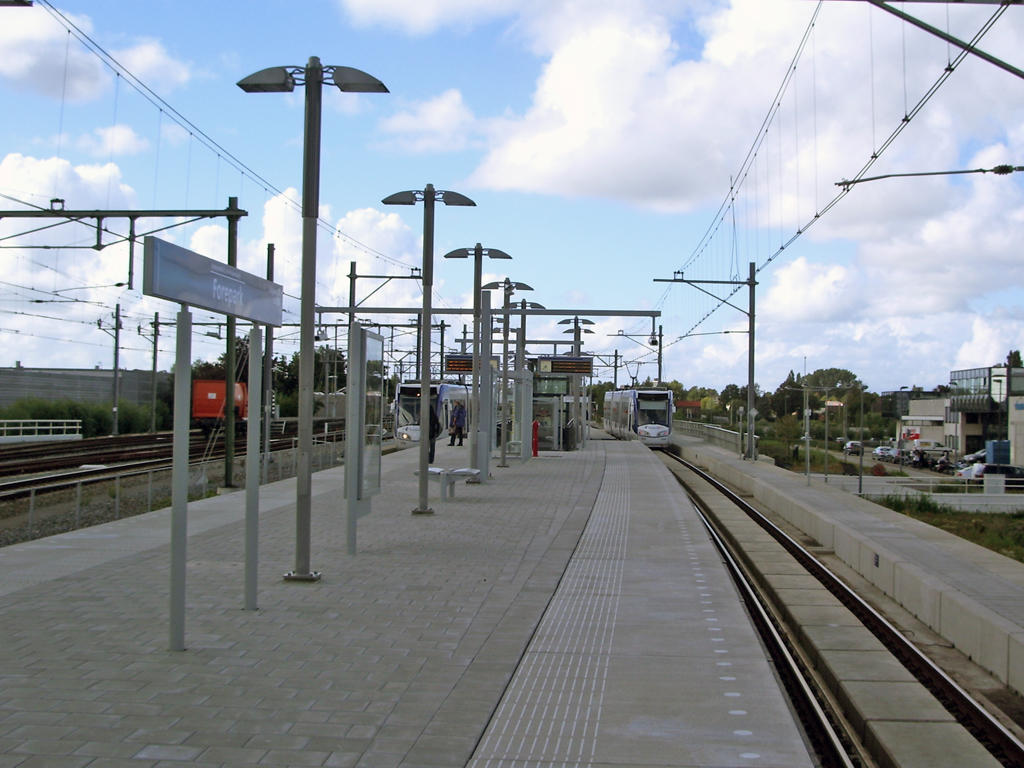
- A RR tram leaving Forepark for Den Haag.

General information
- Location: Netherlands
- Coordinates: 52°04′12″N 4°23′33″E
- Line: E 3 4
- Platforms: 2

History
- Opened: 3 September 2007; 18 years ago

Services
Preceding station	RandstadRail	Following station
Leidschenveen towards Slinge	Line E (RET)	Leidschendam-Voorburg towards Den Haag Centraal
Leidschenveen towards Centrum-West	Line 3 (HTM)	Leidschendam-Voorburg towards Arnold Spoelplein
Leidschenveen towards Lansingerland-Zoetermeer	Line 4 (HTM)	Leidschendam-Voorburg towards De Uithof
Location
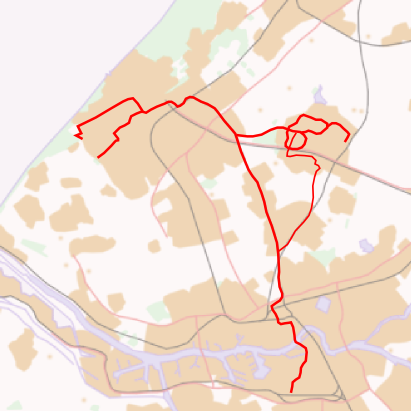
- Location within RandstadRail network

Forepark is the RandstadRail station in the industrial area of Leidschenveen-Ypenburg, a neighbourhood in The Hague, Netherlands. The station features 2 platforms on either side of a viaduct. These have a high and a low platform, with RandstadRail 3 and RandstadRail 4 using the lower platforms, and line E using the higher platforms.

== History ==
The station opened, as part of the RandstadRail project, on 3 September 2007 for the RET metro service (line E) and the HTM tram services (3 & 4). Forepark station serves the ADO Den Haag stadium.

== Train services ==
The following services currently call at Forepark:

Service	Route	Material	Frequency
RR3	Arnold Spoelplein - Pisuissestraat - Mozartlaan - Heliotrooplaan - Muurbloemweg - Hoefbladlaan - De Savornin Lohmanplein - Appelstraat - Zonnebloemstraat - Azaleaplein - Goudenregenstraat - Fahrenheitstraat - Valkenbosplein - Conradkade - Van Speijkstraat - Elandstraat - MCH Westeinde - Brouwersgracht - Grote Markt - Spui - Den Haag Centraal - Beatrixkwartier - Laan van NOI - Voorburg 't Loo - Leidschendam-Voorburg - Forepark - Leidschenveen - Voorweg (Low Level) - Centrum West - Stadhuis - Palenstein - Seghwaert - Leidsewallen - De Leyens - Buytenwegh - Voorweg (High Level) - Meerzicht - Driemanspolder - Delftsewallen - Dorp - Centrum West	HTM RegioCidatis Tram	6x per hour (Monday - Saturday, Every 10 Minutes), 5x per hour (Sundays, Every 12 Minutes), 4x per hour (Evenings, after 8pm, Every 15 Minutes)
RR4	De Uithof - Beresteinaan - Bouwlustlaan - De Rade - Dedemsvaart - Zuidwoldepad - Leyenburg - Monnickendamplein - Tienhovenselaan - Dierenselaan - De La Reyweg - Monstersestraat - MCH Westeinde - Brouwersgracht - Grote Markt - Spui - Den Haag Centraal - Beatrixkwartier - Laan van NOI - Voorburg 't Loo - Leidschendam-Voorburg - Forepark - Leidschenveen - Voorweg (Low Level) - Centrum West - Stadhuis - Palenstein - Seghwaert - Willem Dreeslaan - Oosterheem - Javalaan - van Tuyllpark - Lansingerland-Zoetermeer	HTM RegioCitadis Tram	6x per hour (Monday - Saturday, Every 10 Minutes), 5x per hour (Sundays, Every 12 Minutes), 4x per hour (Evenings, after 8pm, Every 15 Minutes)
E	Den Haag Centraal - Laan van NOI - Voorburg 't Loo - Leidschendam-Voorburg - Forepark - Leidschenveen - Nootdorp - Pijnacker Centrum - Pijnacker Zuid - Berkel Westpolder - Rodenrijs - Meijersplein - Melanchthonweg - Blijdorp - Rotterdam Centraal - Stadhuis - Beurs - Leuvehaven - Wilhelminaplein - Rijnhaven - Maashaven - Zuidplein - Slinge	RET Metro	6x per hour (every 10 minutes), evenings and Sundays: 4x per hour (every 15 minutes)

== Bus service ==
This service departs from street level, 50m north of the station at the bus stop Loire.

- Bus 60 (Leidschenveen - Station Leidschenveen - Station Forepark - Forepark - Station Ypenburg - Nootdorp - Delft - Station Delft)
