= Berkel Westpolder RandstadRail station =

Metro station in Lansingerland, Netherlands

Berkel Westpolder
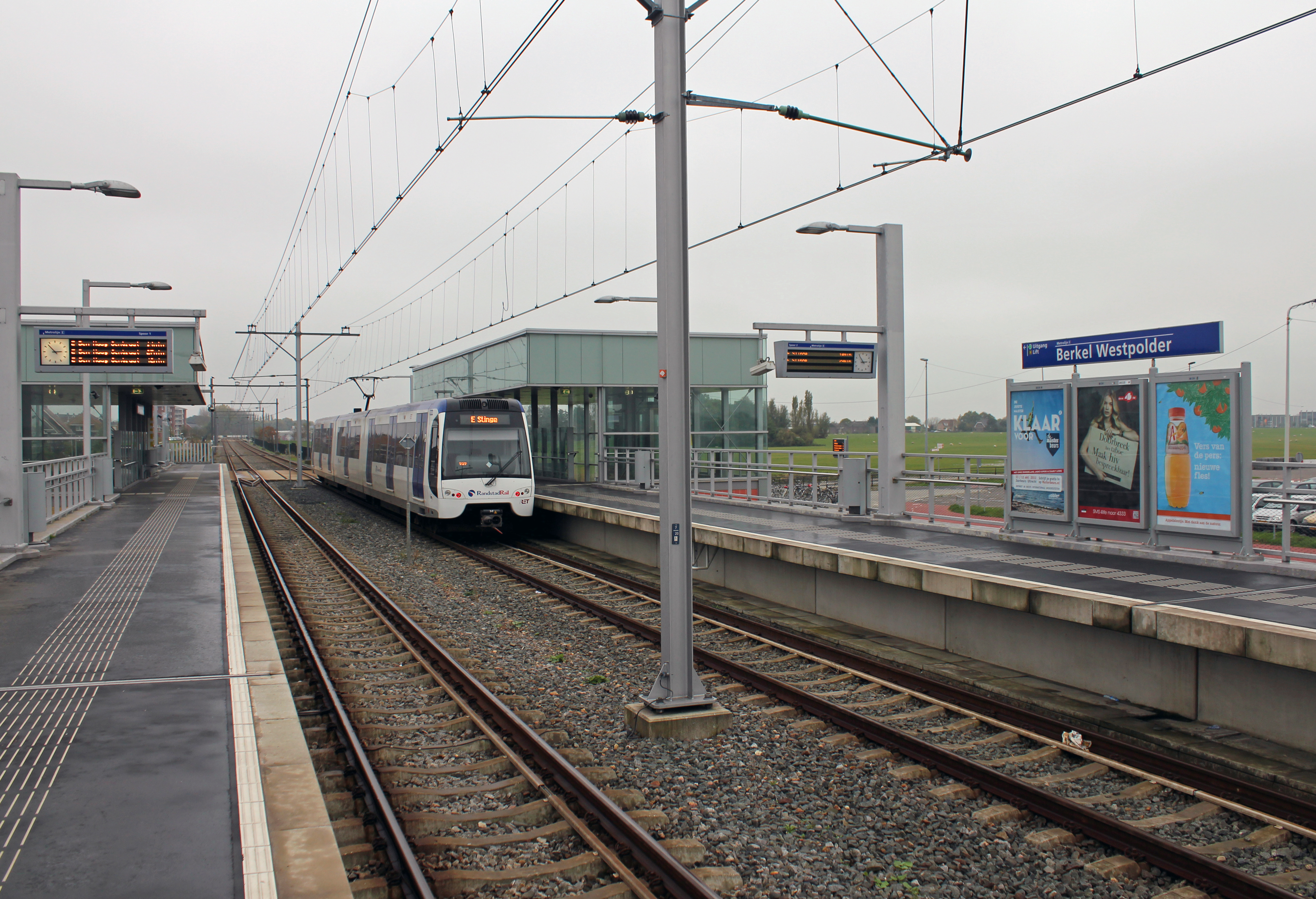

General information
- Location: Netherlands
- Coordinates: 51°59′22″N 4°27′18″E
- Line: E
- Platforms: 2

History
- Opened: 19 December 2008

Services
| Preceding station | RandstadRail | Following station |
|---|---|---|
| Rodenrijs towards Slinge | Line E (RET) | Pijnacker Zuid towards Den Haag Centraal |
Location
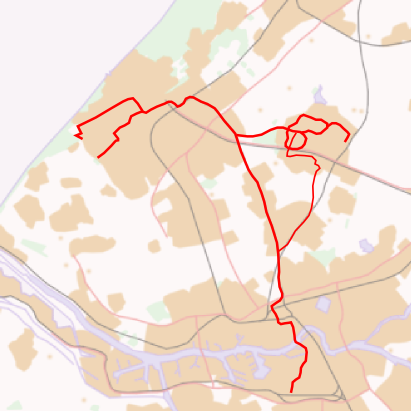
- Location within RandstadRail network

Berkel Westpolder is a metro station, as a part of the Rotterdam metro and the regional light rail system RandstadRail, located in Berkel en Rodenrijs, the Netherlands.

== History ==
The RandstadRail station opened on 19 December 2008 for the RET Erasmuslijn metro service, currently line E. The station features 2 platforms, that are the same height as the train doors.

The station lies at the heart of a new housing development, called Westpolder/Bolwerk. The station was officially opened on 19 January 2009.

The guarded bicycle parking station was closed at the end of 2023 due to budget cuts.

== Train services ==
The following services currently call at Berkel Westpolder:

| Service | Route | Material | Frequency |
|---|---|---|---|
| E | Den Haag Centraal - Laan van NOI - Voorburg 't Loo - Leidschendam-Voorburg - Forepark - Leidschenveen - Nootdorp - Pijnacker Centrum - Pijnacker Zuid - Berkel Westpolder - Rodenrijs - Meijersplein - Melanchthonweg - Blijdorp - Rotterdam Centraal - Stadhuis - Beurs - Leuvehaven - Wilhelminaplein - Rijnhaven - Maashaven - Zuidplein - Slinge | RET Metro | 6x per hour (every 10 minutes), evenings and Sundays: 4x per hour (every 15 minutes) |

== Bus services ==
- 174 (Delft station - Delft TU (University) - Station Westpolder - Berkel en Rodenrijs - Bleiswijk - Bergschenhoek - Berkel en Rodenrijs - Station Westpolder - Delft TU (University) - Delft station)

Operated by Qbuzz, see www.qbuzz.nl or https://web.archive.org/web/20100305175339/http://www.qbuzz.nl/regio%2Brotterdam/cDU3_default.aspx
