= Nootdorp RandstadRail station =

Nootdorp
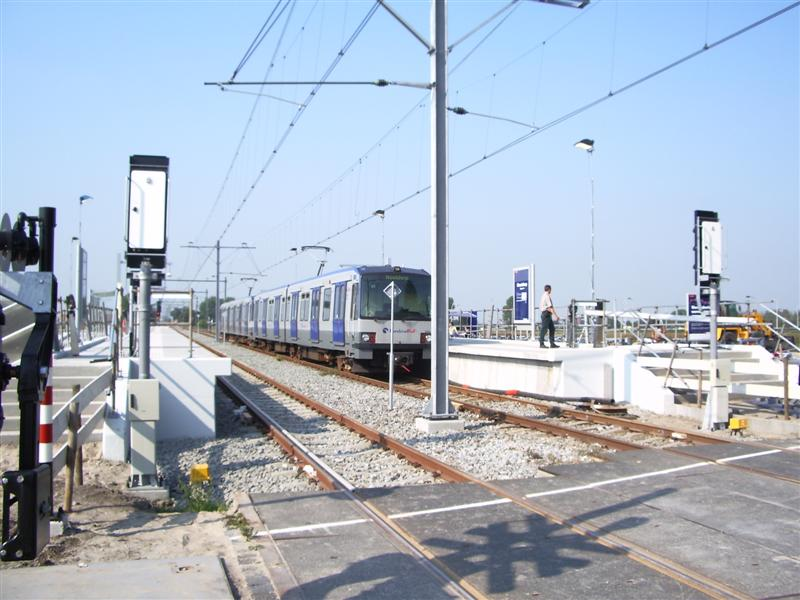
- Nootdorp RandstadRail station in 2006

General information
- Location: Netherlands
- Coordinates: 52°02′52″N 4°24′52″E
- Line: E
- Platforms: 2

History
- Opened: 10 Sep 2006

Services
| Preceding station | RandstadRail | Following station |
|---|---|---|
| Pijnacker Centrum towards Slinge | Line E (RET) | Leidschenveen towards Den Haag Centraal |
Location
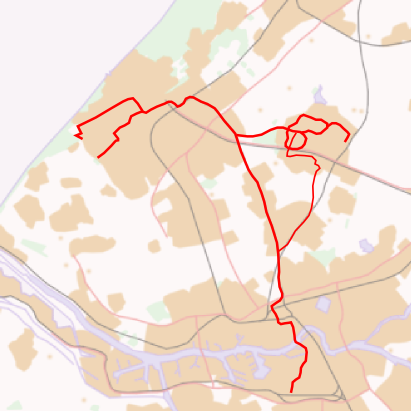
- Location within RandstadRail network

Nootdorp is a RandstadRail station located in Nootdorp, the Netherlands.

== History ==
The RandstadRail station opened on 10 September 2006 for the RET Erasmuslijn metro service, currently line E. The station features 2 platforms, by a level crossing of the 's Gravenweg. These have platforms that are the same height as the train doors.

Between 1908 and 1938 the station Nootdorp Oost was located here.

In 2006 and 2007 the station was the terminus of all metro services, when they only operated Rotterdam Hofplein - Nootdorp. The station lies near the new housing area 's-Gravenhout and the industrial estate Grote Driehoek.

== Train services ==
The following services currently call at Nootdorp:

| Service | Route | Material | Frequency |
|---|---|---|---|
| E | Den Haag Centraal - Laan van NOI - Voorburg 't Loo - Leidschendam-Voorburg - Forepark - Leidschenveen - Nootdorp - Pijnacker Centrum - Pijnacker Zuid - Berkel Westpolder - Rodenrijs - Meijersplein - Melanchthonweg - Blijdorp - Rotterdam Centraal - Stadhuis - Beurs - Leuvehaven - Wilhelminaplein - Rijnhaven - Maashaven - Zuidplein - Slinge | RET Metro | 6x per hour (every 10 minutes), evenings and Sundays: 4x per hour (every 15 minutes) |

== Bus services ==
These services depart from near the station: Follow the cycle path southwards, over the Hofweg, walk about 200m.

- 131 (Nootdorp Centrum - Nootdorp RR - Pijnacker Centrum RR - Pijnacker Gemeentekantoor (operated by Veolia Haaglanden)

== Gallery ==
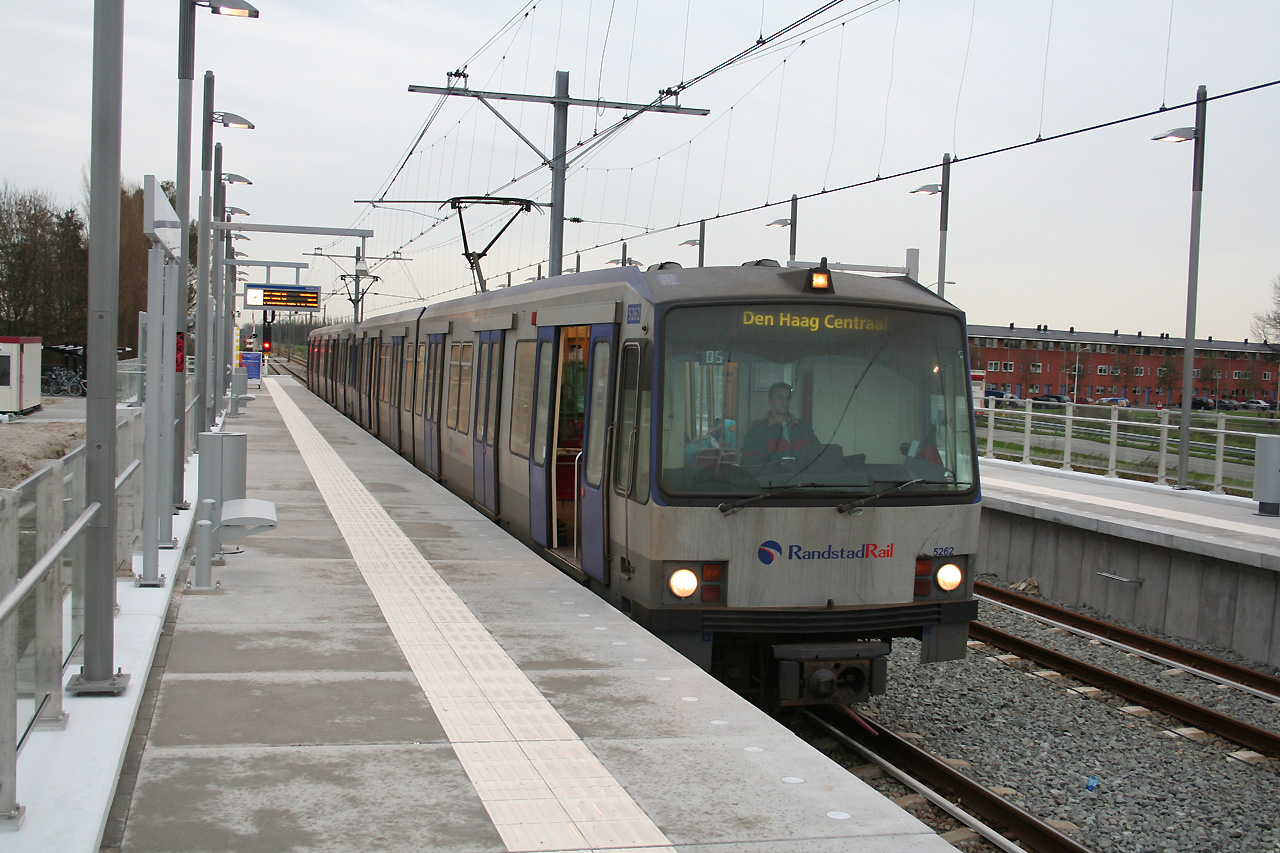
The station with a RET metro set heading to Den Haag Centraal.

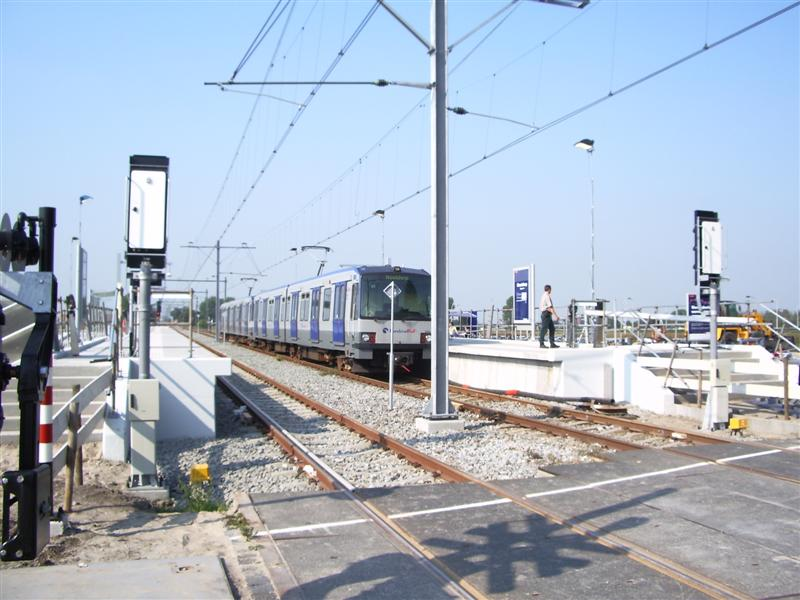
The station in 2006, while it was still the terminus station.
