= Klapwijk =

Klapwijk is a Dutch surname. Notable people with the surname include:

- Arie Klapwijk (1921–2008), Dutch physician
- Jacob Klapwijk (1933–2021), Dutch philosopher and professor
- Niels Klapwijk (born 1985), Dutch volleyball and beach volleyball player
- Philip Klapwijk, British economist
- Truus Klapwijk (1904–1991), Dutch diver and swimmer
- Vrouwke Klapwijk (born 1956), Dutch children's writer
