= Hofpleinlijn =

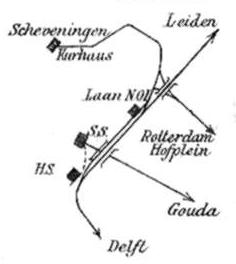
Railway lines and stations in The Hague (1936), including the Scheveningen line and the connection to Rotterdam Hofplein. The Hague S.S. is now known as The Hague Central.

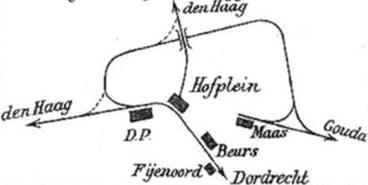
Stations in Rotterdam.

The Hofpleinlijn (Spoorlijn Rotterdam Hofplein - Scheveningen) was one of two railways between the Dutch cities of The Hague and Rotterdam. In 2006 it was converted to metro-like operation as RandstadRail line E.

== History ==
The Zuid-Hollandsche Electrische Spoorweg-Maatschappij (ZHESM) company was founded in 1900 to build electric railway lines in the province of South Holland. Their first railway line connected Den Haag Hollands Spoor station with the seaside resort of Scheveningen. This line opened with steam traction on 1 May 1907 and was electrified in 1908. Its second line connected The Hague with Rotterdam. It opened in 1908, and was the first electrified railway line in the Netherlands (using world-unique 10 kV 25 Hz voltage, changed in 1926 to Netherlands standard 1500 V). The terminus in Rotterdam was the Rotterdam Hofplein station, which gives the line its name.

In Rotterdam, connecting curves to the main railway towards Rotterdam Delftsche Poort and from 1951 also towards Rotterdam Noord existed, but nevertheless the Hofpleinlijn had only local significance. In 1953 the line to Scheveningen closed. The line between The Hague and Hofplein was converted to metro-like operation in 2006. Hofplein station was closed in 2010, when a tunnel connected the line to the Rotterdam Metro at Rotterdam Centraal station.

== See also ==
- History of rail transport in the Netherlands
