= Den Haag Laan van NOI railway station =

Railway station in The Hague, Netherlands

Den Haag Laan van NOI
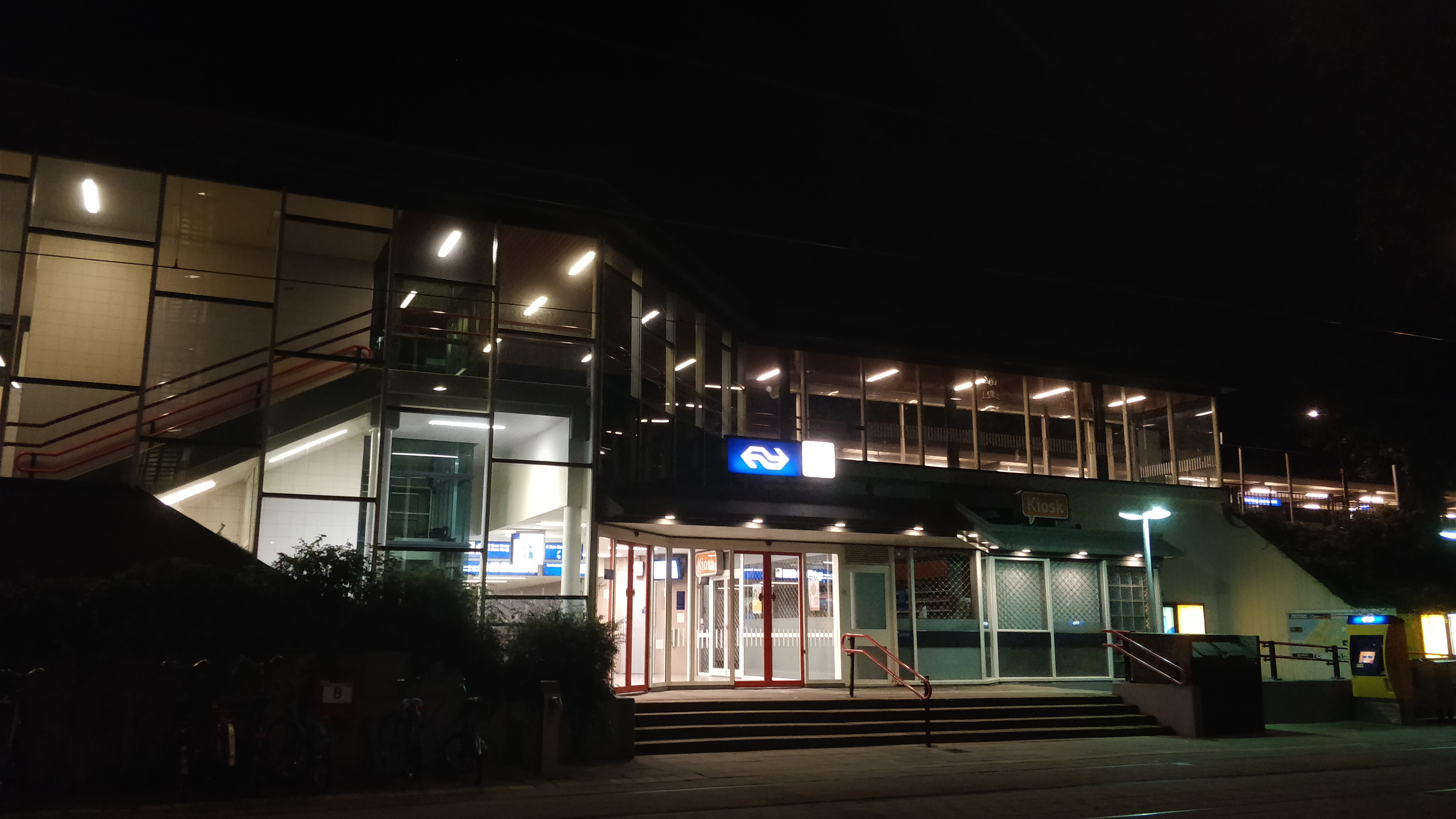

General information
- Location: Laan van Nieuw Oost-Indië, The Hague; Netherlands
- Coordinates: 52°4′44″N 4°20′35″E
- Operator: Nederlandse Spoorwegen
- Line: Amsterdam–Rotterdam railway
- Platforms: 4 (Nederlandse Spoorwegen), 2 (RandstadRail)
- Connections: RET Rotterdam Metro: E HTM Den Haag Tram: 2, 3, 4 HTM: 23

Other information
- Station code: LAA

History
- Opened: 1 May 1907; 119 years ago (current)

Services
Preceding station	Nederlandse Spoorwegen	Following station
Den Haag HS towards Vlissingen	NS Intercity 2200	Leiden Centraal towards Amsterdam Centraal
Den Haag HS towards Vlissingen	NS Intercity 2300 Mon-Fri until 20:00	Leiden Centraal towards Amsterdam Centraal
Den Haag HS towards Rotterdam Centraal	NS Intercity 3200 Mon-Thurs before 19:00	Leiden Centraal towards Arnhem Centraal
Den Haag HS towards Dordrecht	NS Intercity 3500	Leiden Centraal towards Venlo
Den Haag Centraal Terminus	NS Sprinter 4300	Den Haag Mariahoeve towards Lelystad Centrum
Den Haag Centraal Terminus	NS Sprinter 6300 2x/hour; Not on evenings and weekends	Den Haag Mariahoeve towards Haarlem
Preceding station	RandstadRail	Following station
Voorburg 't Loo towards Slinge	Line E (RET)	Den Haag Centraal Terminus
Voorburg 't Loo towards Centrum-West	Line 3 (HTM)	Beatrixkwartier towards Arnold Spoelplein
Voorburg 't Loo towards Lansingerland-Zoetermeer	Line 4 (HTM)	Beatrixkwartier towards De Uithof
Location
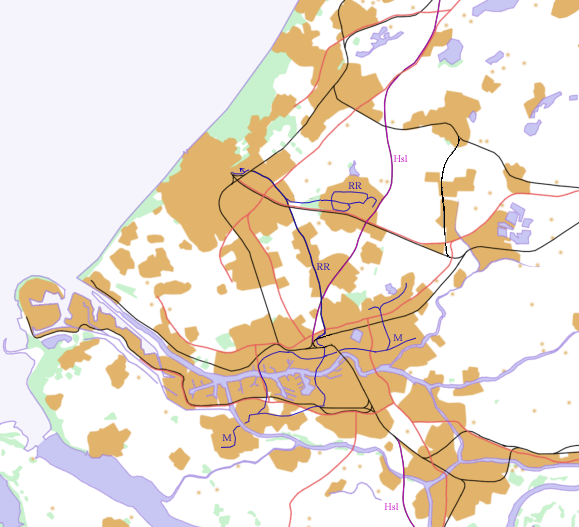
- Location within Southwest Randstad Location within Netherlands

Den Haag Laan van NOI railway station is a railway station in the Netherlands, on the border between The Hague and the town of Voorburg. It is served by the Nederlandse Spoorwegen (Dutch railway) and by the RandstadRail light-rail network. The station is named after the road on which it is located, Laan van Nieuw Oost-Indië, which literally translates as New East Indies Avenue, but probably refers to a former inn called Nieuw Oosteinde (New East End).

== History ==
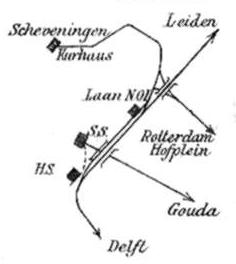
Train stations in The Hague; situation between 1908 and 1953.

Laan van NOI is located on the oldest railway line in the Netherlands, the "Old Line" between Amsterdam and Rotterdam. The part of the line between Leiden and The Hague opened in 1843. The station "Nieuw Oosteinde" was located on the crossing with the Laan van Nieuw Oosteinde, near the inn "Nieuw Oosteinde". Nieuw Oosteinde was open from 1843 to 1864.

A new station opened in the same location on 1 May 1907 on the new line Den Haag Hollands Spoor - Scheveningen, and in 1908 the Hofpleinlijn between Hollands Spoor and Rotterdam Hofplein via Laan van NOI was opened: the first electrified railway in the Netherlands. Both new lines followed the "Old Line" between Hollands Spoor and Laan van NOI. Although the new station was located on the old line, it did not have platforms on that line, and trains between The Hague and Leiden did not stop there until 15 May 1931.

The line to Scheveningen closed in 1953. In 1979, a new connection was opened to Zoetermeer. Both the Hofpleinlijn to Rotterdam and the line to Zoetermeer were converted to light rail in 2006.

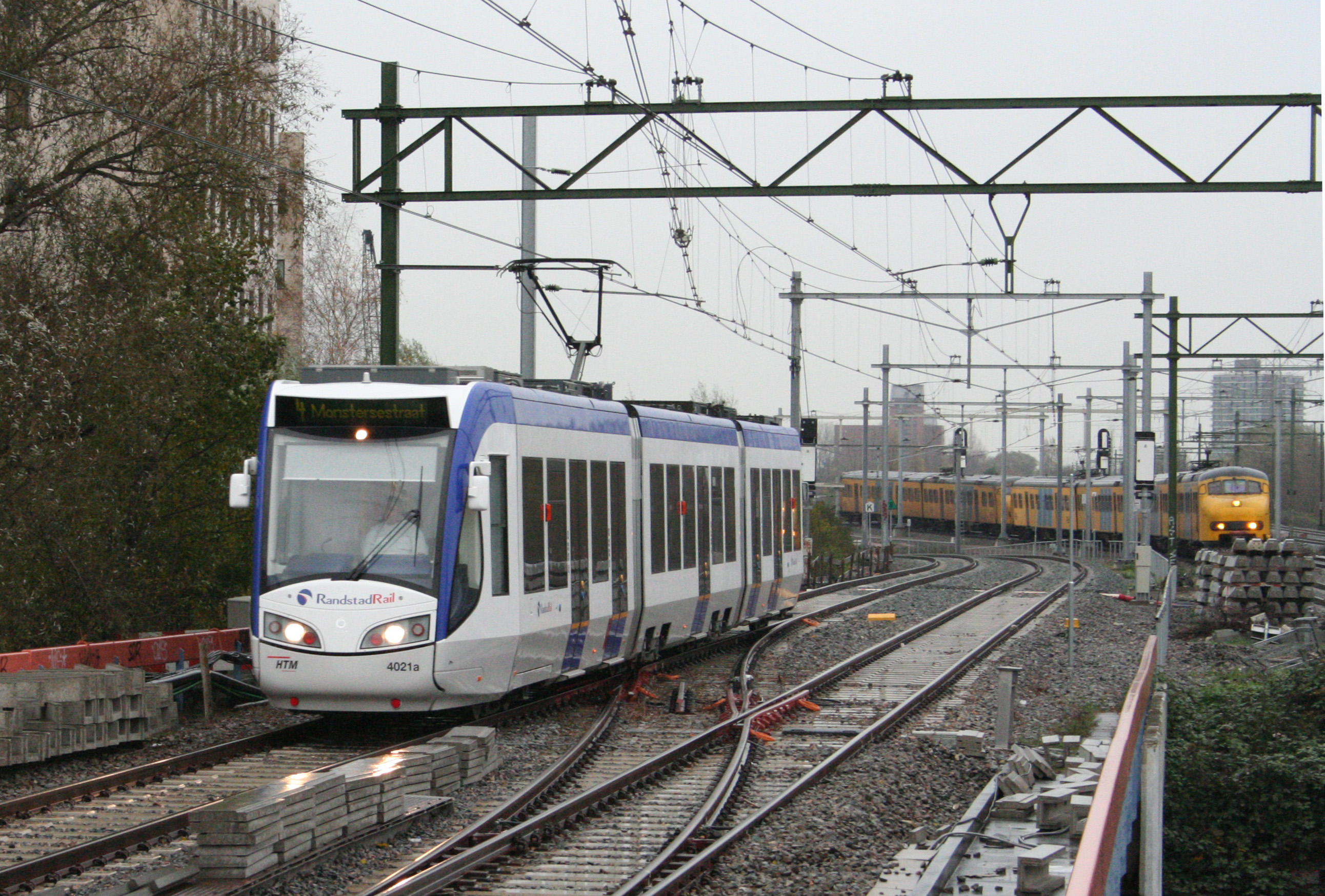
A RandstadRail Tram and an NS Train at Laan van NOI

== Name of the station ==
The first station was named after an inn, "Nieuw Oosteinde". When the station re-opened in 1907, it took the name of the road. The road crosses an administrative border at the railway station, and changes its name at that point: it is currently called "Laan van Nieuw Oost-Indië" in The Hague, and "Laan van Nieuw Oosteinde" in Voorburg. Both names were formerly used for the entire road, and for the railway station; in recent years, the "Oost-Indië" variant was most common for the station, possibly because the station is located on the Hague side of the border.

In 1978, the city name was added, and the road name was abbreviated: since then, the railway station has been called "Den Haag Laan van NOI". The name of the RandstadRail stop is just "Laan van NOI".

== Current services ==
Den Haag Laan van NOI is served by the following services:

- Nederlandse Spoorwegen trains:
  - 2x per hour intercity service Amsterdam - Haarlem - The Hague - Rotterdam - Dordrecht- Roosendaal - Vlissingen
  - 2x per hour intercity service Lelystad - Almere - Amsterdam - Schiphol - The Hague - Rotterdam - Dordrecht
  - 2x per hour local service (sprinter) The Hague - Leiden - Schiphol - Amsterdam
  - 2x per hour local service (sprinter) The Hague - Leiden - Haarlem
- RandstadRail light rail:
  - line E The Hague - Pijnacker - Rotterdam
  - line RR3 Loosduinen - The Hague centre - Zoetermeer
  - line RR4 De Uithof - The Hague centre - Zoetermeer
- HTM tram 2 Kraayenstein - The Hague centre - Leidschendam
