= Beurs metro station =

Main transfer station of the Rotterdam Metro

Beurs
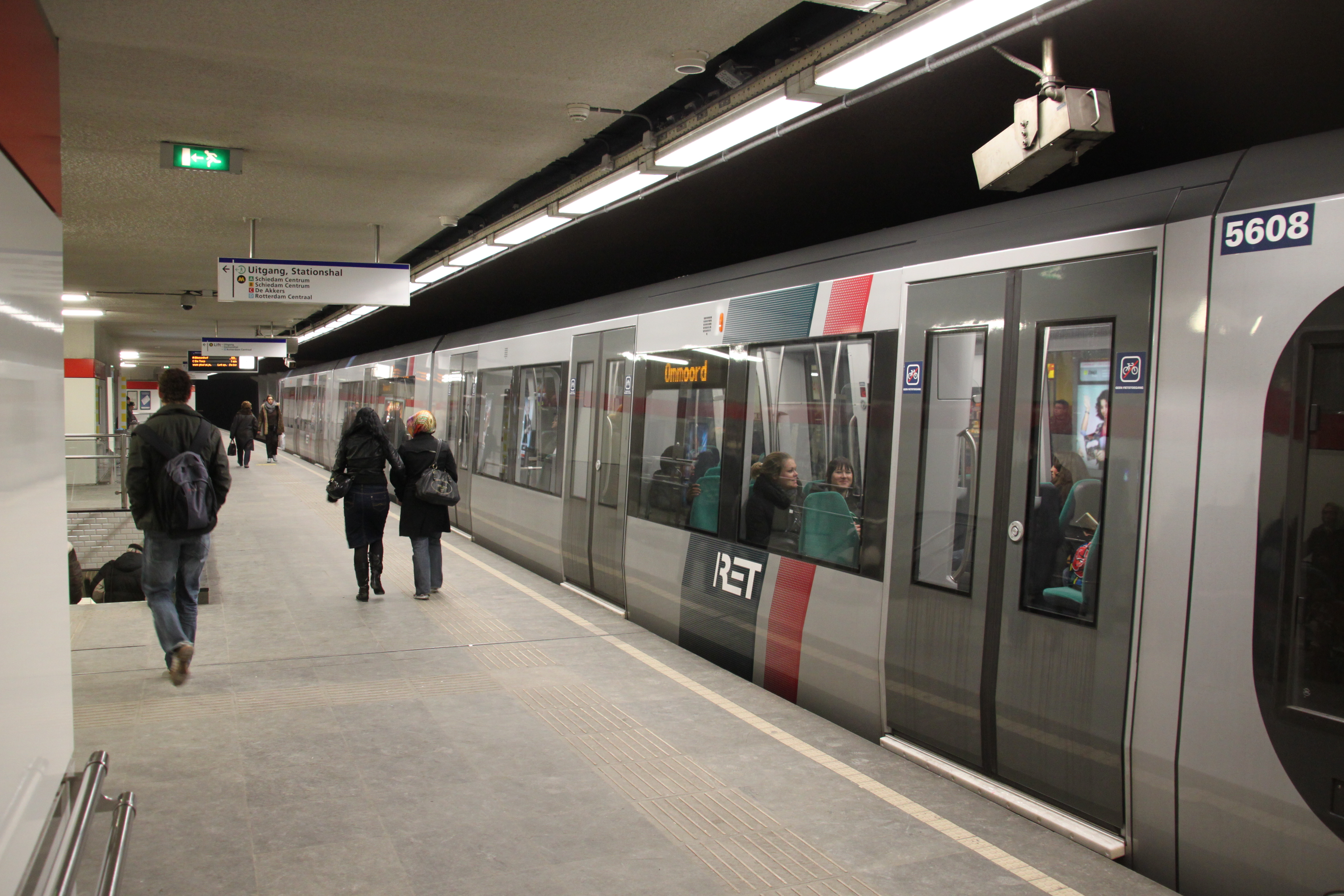

General information
- Coordinates: 51°55′07″N 4°28′50″E
- System: Rotterdam Metro station
- Owner: RET

Construction
- Structure type: Underground

History
- Opened: 1968

Services
Preceding station	Rotterdam Metro	Following station
Eendrachtsplein towards Vlaardingen West	Line A Not on evenings and early weekend mornings	Blaak towards Binnenhof
Eendrachtsplein towards Hoek van Holland Strand	Line B	Blaak towards Nesselande
Eendrachtsplein towards De Akkers	Line C	Blaak towards De Terp
Leuvehaven towards De Akkers	Line D	Stadhuis towards Rotterdam Centraal
Leuvehaven towards Slinge	Line E	Stadhuis towards Den Haag Centraal
Location

Beurs is a major subway interchange station in the center of Rotterdam. Underneath Churchill Square (Dutch: Churchillplein), the two lines through the city center (lines A-B-C and lines D-E) intersect. Passengers for Rotterdam Central Station change here to line D or E if they started their journey on line A, B, or C.

All destinations within the network are accessible from Beurs. Since December 2011, it has also been incorporated into the new RandstadRail network, resulting in a direct connection to The Hague (line E).

== History ==
One of the oldest railway stations in Rotterdam was called Beurs, but that station was on the location where in 1953 Rotterdam Blaak was built.

The metro station Beurs opened on 9 February 1968 on the North-South Line (also temporarily called Erasmuslijn). On 6 May 1982 a new station, Churchillplein, was opened nearby on the new East-West Line (also temporarily Calandlijn). Both stations were connected by an underground walkway. In 2000, this separate naming was abandoned. For a while, signs in the East-West Line-portion of the station still had 'Churchillplein' in a smaller font below 'Beurs', but this has been removed.

In 2002, the capacity of Beurs metrostation was doubled. In 2018, Beurs was the busiest metrostation of the Netherlands with 128.000 transit passengers per day. For 2024, another renovation was proposed.
