= Stadhuis metro station =

Metro station in Rotterdam, the Netherlands

Stadhuis
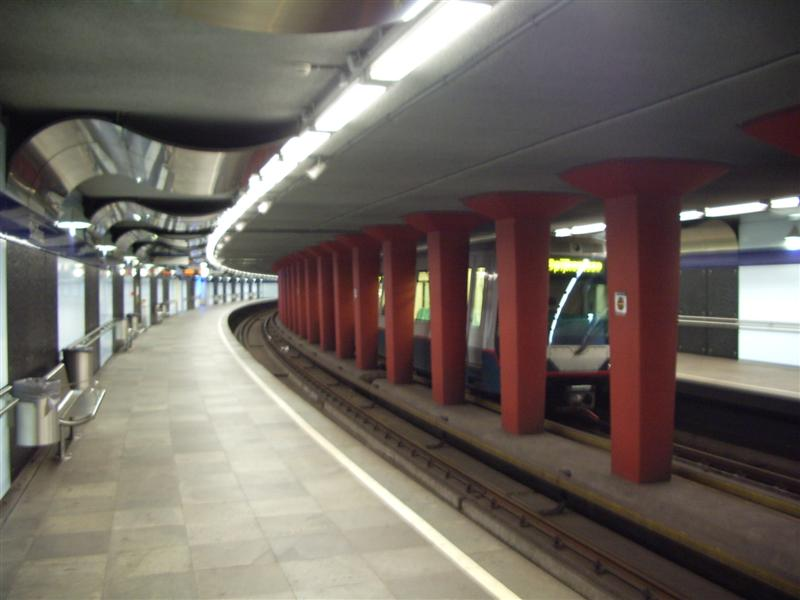

General information
- Coordinates: 51°55′24″N 4°28′42″E
- System: Rotterdam Metro station
- Owner: RET
- Tracks: 2

Construction
- Structure type: Underground

History
- Opened: 1968

Services
Preceding station	Rotterdam Metro	Following station
Beurs towards De Akkers	Line D	Rotterdam Centraal Terminus
Beurs towards Slinge	Line E	Rotterdam Centraal towards Den Haag Centraal
Location

Stadhuis (Dutch for town hall) is an underground subway station in the city of Rotterdam, and is located on Rotterdam Metro lines D and E. The station opened on 9 February 1968, the same date that the North-South Line (also temporarily called Erasmus line), of which it is a part, was opened.

The station is located in the center of Rotterdam, underneath the Coolsingel, a major street through the center.
