= Rijnhaven metro station =

Subway station in Rotterdam, Netherlands

Rijnhaven
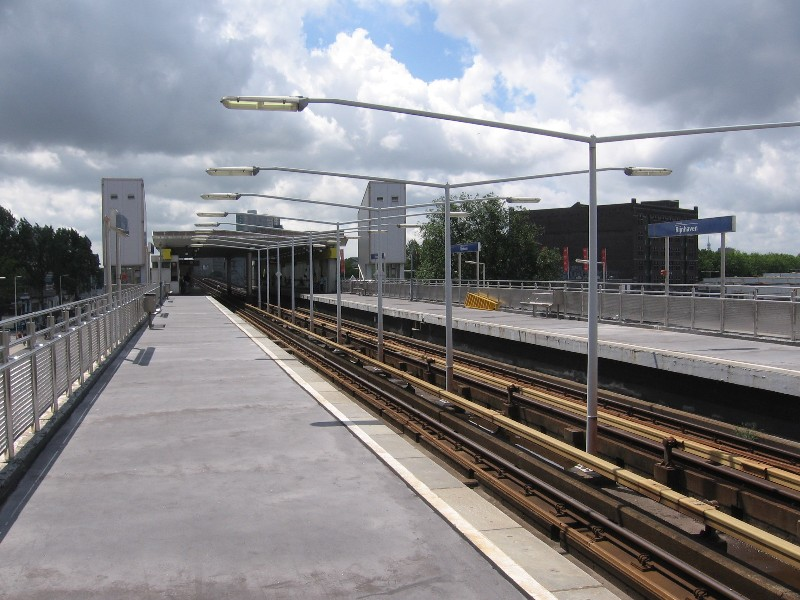

General information
- Coordinates: 51°54′14″N 4°29′49″E
- System: Rotterdam Metro station
- Owner: RET
- Platforms: Side platforms
- Tracks: 2

Construction
- Structure type: Elevated

History
- Opened: 1968

Services
Preceding station	Rotterdam Metro	Following station
Maashaven towards De Akkers	Line D	Wilhelminaplein towards Rotterdam Centraal
Maashaven towards Slinge	Line E	Wilhelminaplein towards Den Haag Centraal
Location

Rijnhaven is an above-ground subway station in the south of the city of Rotterdam. It is part of Rotterdam Metro lines D and E.

The station opened on 9 February 1968, the same date that the North-South Line (also formerly called Erasmus line), of which it is a part, was opened. The station is in the borough “Kop van Zuid - Entrepot”. Near the station, travelers can get on RET-operated bus line 77 which can bring them to the SS Rotterdam.

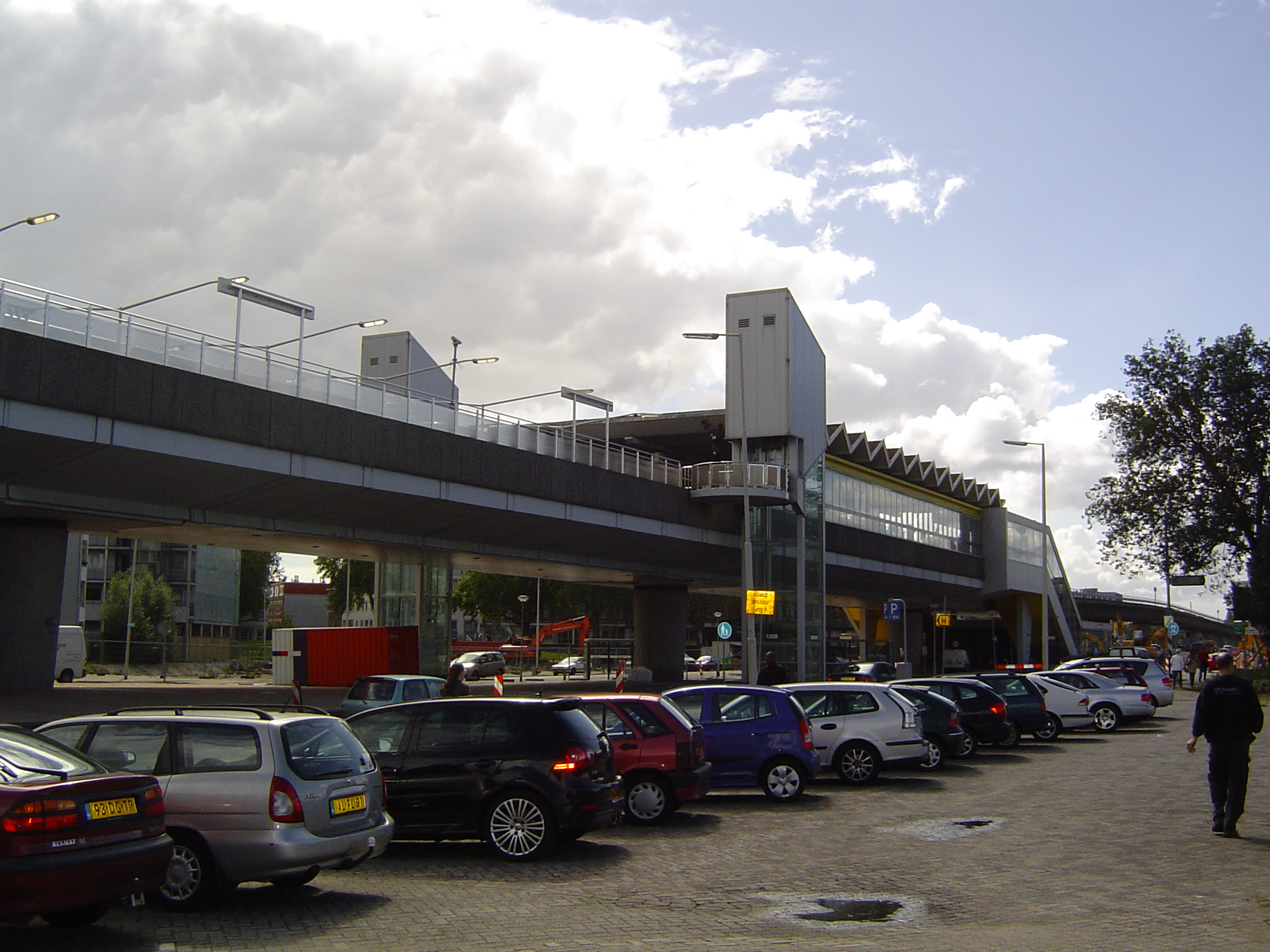
Elevated Rijnhaven station as seen from street-level
