= Slinge metro station =

Metro station in Rotterdam, Netherlands

Slinge
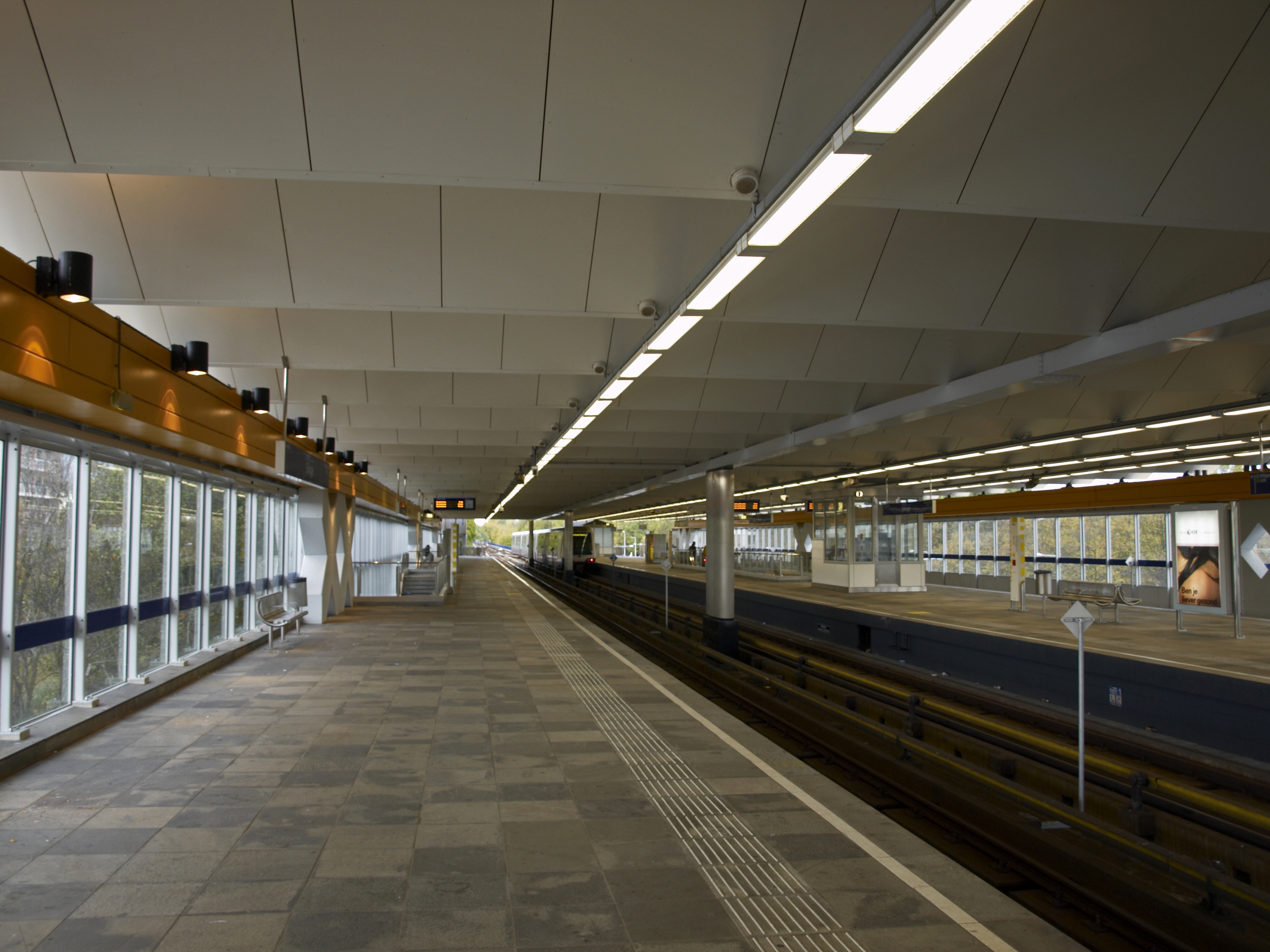

General information
- Coordinates: 51°52′29″N 4°28′40″E
- System: Rotterdam Metro station
- Owner: RET
- Platforms: One side and one island platform
- Tracks: 3

Construction
- Structure type: Elevated

History
- Opened: 1970

Services
Preceding station	Rotterdam Metro	Following station
Rhoon towards De Akkers	Line D	Zuidplein towards Rotterdam Centraal
Terminus	Line E	Zuidplein towards Den Haag Centraal
Location

Slinge is an above-ground subway station in the south of the city of Rotterdam. It is part of Rotterdam Metro lines D and E. Slinge is the southern terminus of line E, while line D trains continue towards De Akkers station.

== History ==
The station opened on 25 November 1970 as part of a one-station extension of the North-South Line (also formerly called Erasmus line). It improved the accessibility of Pendrecht. It has two platforms and three running tracks; the inner track is only used by trains terminating at Slinge, while the other trains use the outer two tracks.
