= Den Haag HS railway station =

Railway station in The Hague, Netherlands

Den Haag HS
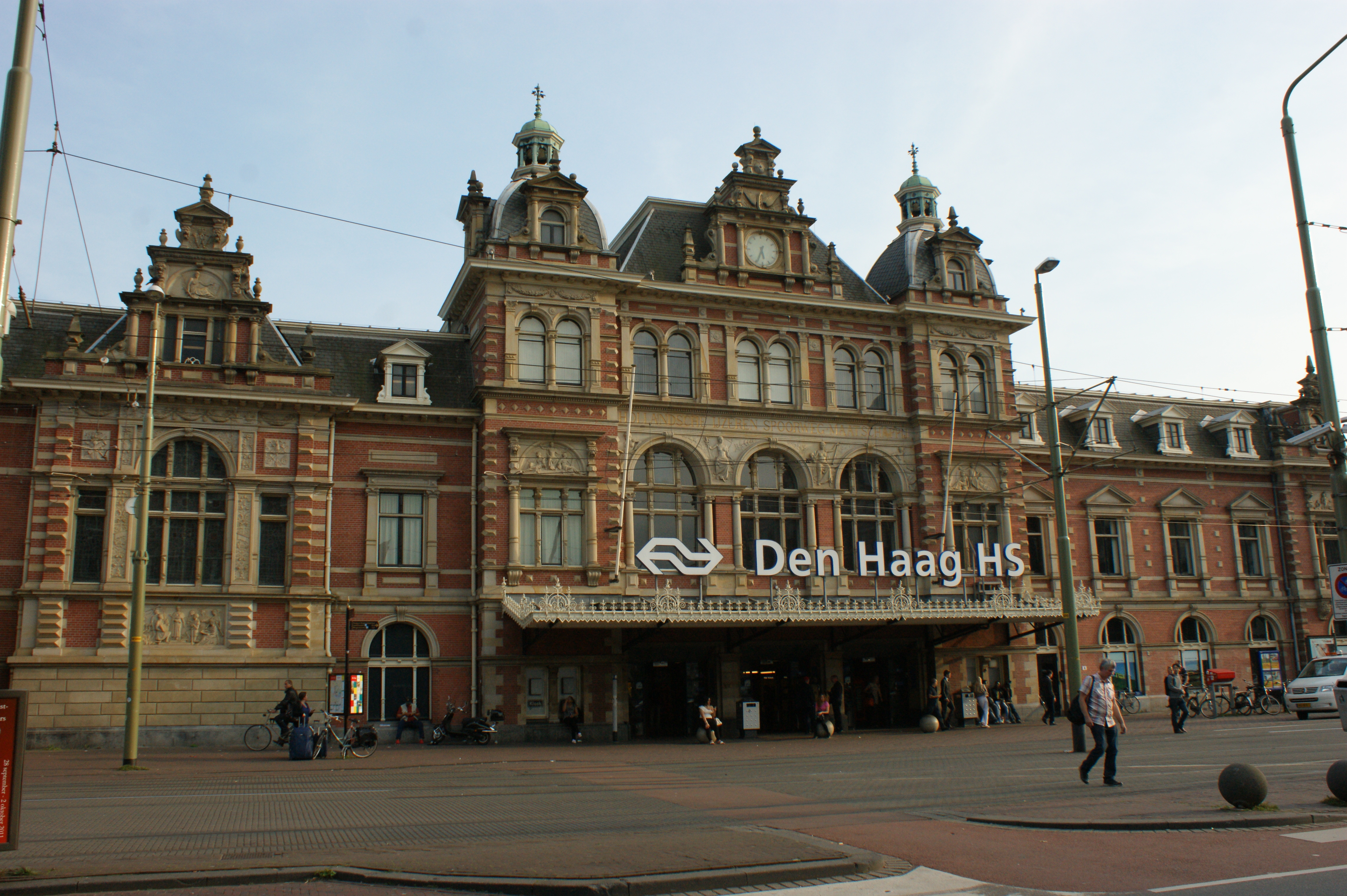

General information
- Location: Stationsplein 41; 2515 BV The Hague, South Holland, Netherlands; Netherlands
- Coordinates: 52°4′11″N 4°19′18″E
- Operator: Nederlandse Spoorwegen
- Line: Amsterdam–Haarlem–Rotterdam railway
- Platforms: 6
- Connections: HTM Den Haag Tram: 1, 9, 11, 12, 15, 16, 17; HTM: 22, 26, 27, 29

Other information
- Station code: Gv

History
- Opened: 6 December 1843; 182 years ago
Services
Preceding station	European Sleeper	Following station
Rotterdam Centraal towards Brussels-South	Brussels–Prague	Amsterdam Centraal towards Prague
Preceding station	Nederlandse Spoorwegen	Following station
Delft towards Eindhoven Centraal	NS Intercity 1100	Den Haag Centraal Terminus
Delft towards Rotterdam Centraal	NS Nachtnet 1400 Night train, Not on Wed	Leiden Centraal towards Utrecht Centraal
Delft towards Vlissingen	NS Intercity 2200	Den Haag Laan van NOI towards Amsterdam Centraal
Delft towards Vlissingen	NS Intercity 2300 Mon-Fri until 20:00	Den Haag Laan van NOI towards Amsterdam Centraal
Delft towards Rotterdam Centraal	NS Intercity 3200 Mon-Thurs before 19:00	Den Haag Laan van NOI towards Arnhem Centraal
Delft towards Dordrecht	NS Intercity 3500	Den Haag Laan van NOI towards Venlo
Reverses direction	NS Nachtnet 11400 Wednesday Night only	Leiden Centraal towards Utrecht Centraal
Reverses direction	NS Nachtnet 11400 Wednesday Night only	Rotterdam Centraal Terminus
Den Haag Moerwijk towards Dordrecht	NS Sprinter 5000 Mon-Fri until 20:00	Den Haag Centraal Terminus
Den Haag Moerwijk towards Dordrecht	NS Sprinter 5100	Den Haag Centraal Terminus
Den Haag Moerwijk towards Dordrecht	NS Sprinter 5200 Mon-Thu until 19:00	Den Haag Centraal Terminus
Location
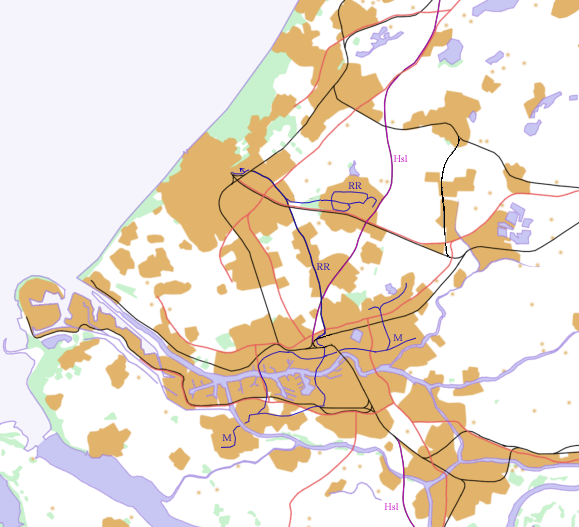
- Location within Southwest Randstad Location within Netherlands

Den Haag HS (English: The Hague HS), an abbreviation of the original name Den Haag Hollands Spoor (The Hague Holland Rail), is the oldest train station in The Hague, South Holland, Netherlands, located on the Amsterdam–Haarlem–Rotterdam railway. It is the second main station in The Hague and, unlike The Hague Central Station, it is not a terminus station. The name of the station is derived from the former Hollandsche IJzeren Spoorweg-Maatschappij (HIJSM) which was the first Dutch railway company.

== History ==
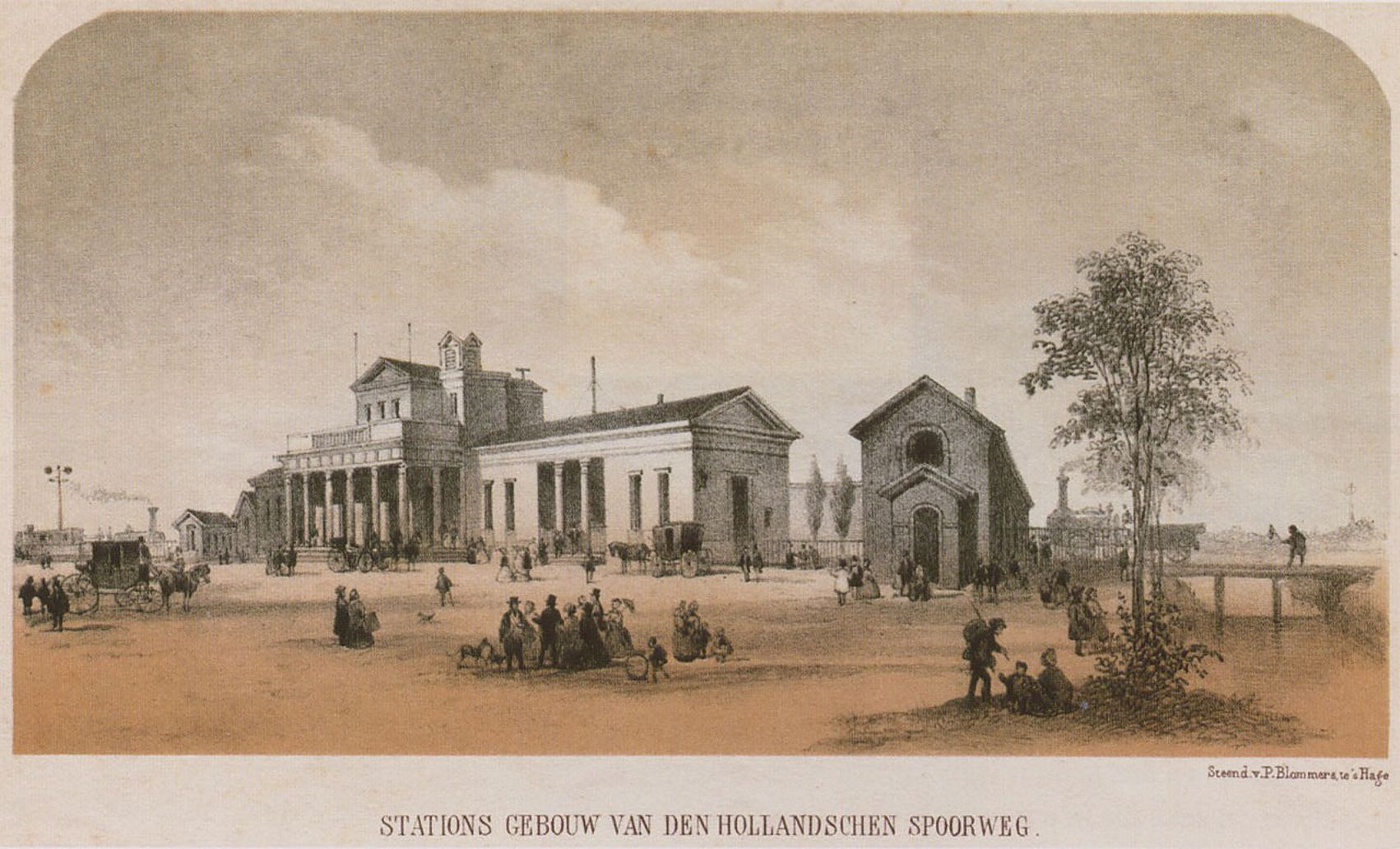
The original building of Hollands Spoor, designed by Frederik Willem Conrad.

Hollands Spoor opened on 6 December 1843, after the Amsterdam–Haarlem railway, the oldest railway in the country, had been extended to The Hague. This line was further extended to Rotterdam in 1847. At the time, the area was a grassland and belonged to the municipality of Rijswijk. Lacking the people to manage law enforcement around the station, Rijswijk ceded the land to the municipality of The Hague. The railway station was named Holland Spoor, after the company which operated it, the Hollandsche IJzeren Spoorweg-Maatschappij. The original building, which was designed by Frederik Willem Conrad, was demolished in 1891 to make way for a Neo-Renaissance building designed by Dirk Margadant. The current station building is one of three in the Netherlands with an active royal waiting room reserved for the Dutch monarchy.

In 1870, the rival company Nederlandsche Rhijnspoorweg-Maatschappij opened a second main railway station in The Hague, Den Haag Rhijnspoor, on the newly constructed Gouda–Den Haag railway. A railway connection between the two stations was constructed a year later. In 1962, David Jokinen saw an opportunity to put an end to the situation between the two. The plan was not implemented. Despite the plan not being implemented, Staatsspoor station was demolished in 1973, to make way for the Den Haag Centraal railway station. As a result, The Hague has two main railway stations: Centraal Station and Hollands Spoor. Trains from Amsterdam to Rotterdam and beyond (Brussels) tend to stop at The Hague HS, whereas trains from Utrecht and Eastern and North-Eastern directions (also by Leiden/Amsterdam Airport Schiphol/Amsterdam) usually stop at Centraal Station. Several trains in southern direction serve both stations.

== Train services ==
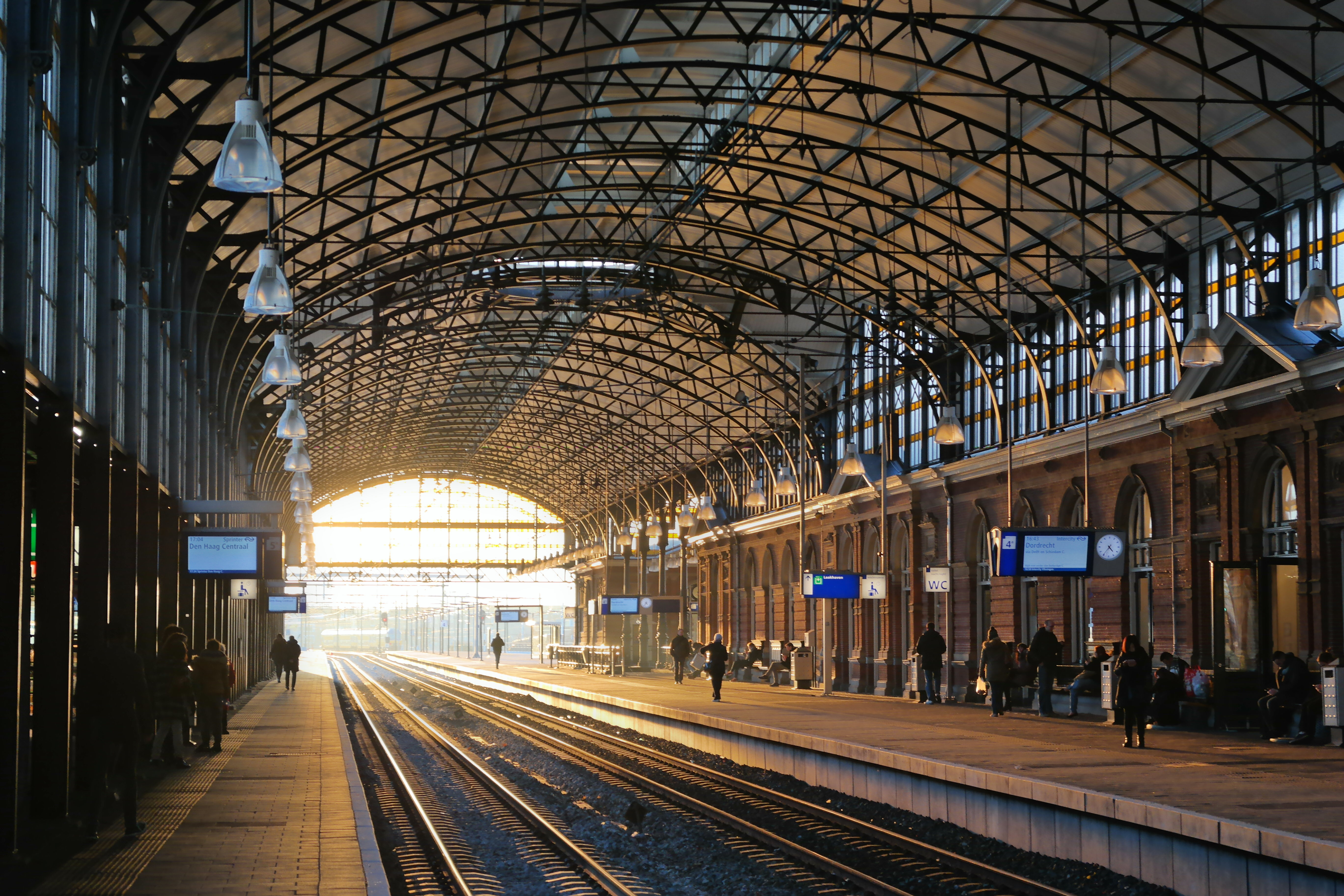
View of the platforms inside the station.

The station is served by the following services:

- 4x per day International services (Intercity) The Hague - Rotterdam - Breda - Antwerp - Mechelen - Brussels
- 1x per hour night train (nachtnet) services Rotterdam - The Hague - Amsterdam - Utrecht
- 2x per hour Intercity services Amsterdam - Haarlem - Leiden - The Hague - Dordrecht - Roosendaal - Vlissingen
- 2x per hour Intercity services Lelystad - Almere - Amsterdam - Schiphol - The Hague - Rotterdam - Dordrecht
- 2x per hour Intercity services The Hague - Rotterdam - Breda - Eindhoven
- 4x per hour Local services (Sprinter) The Hague - Rotterdam - Dordrecht

== Tram services ==
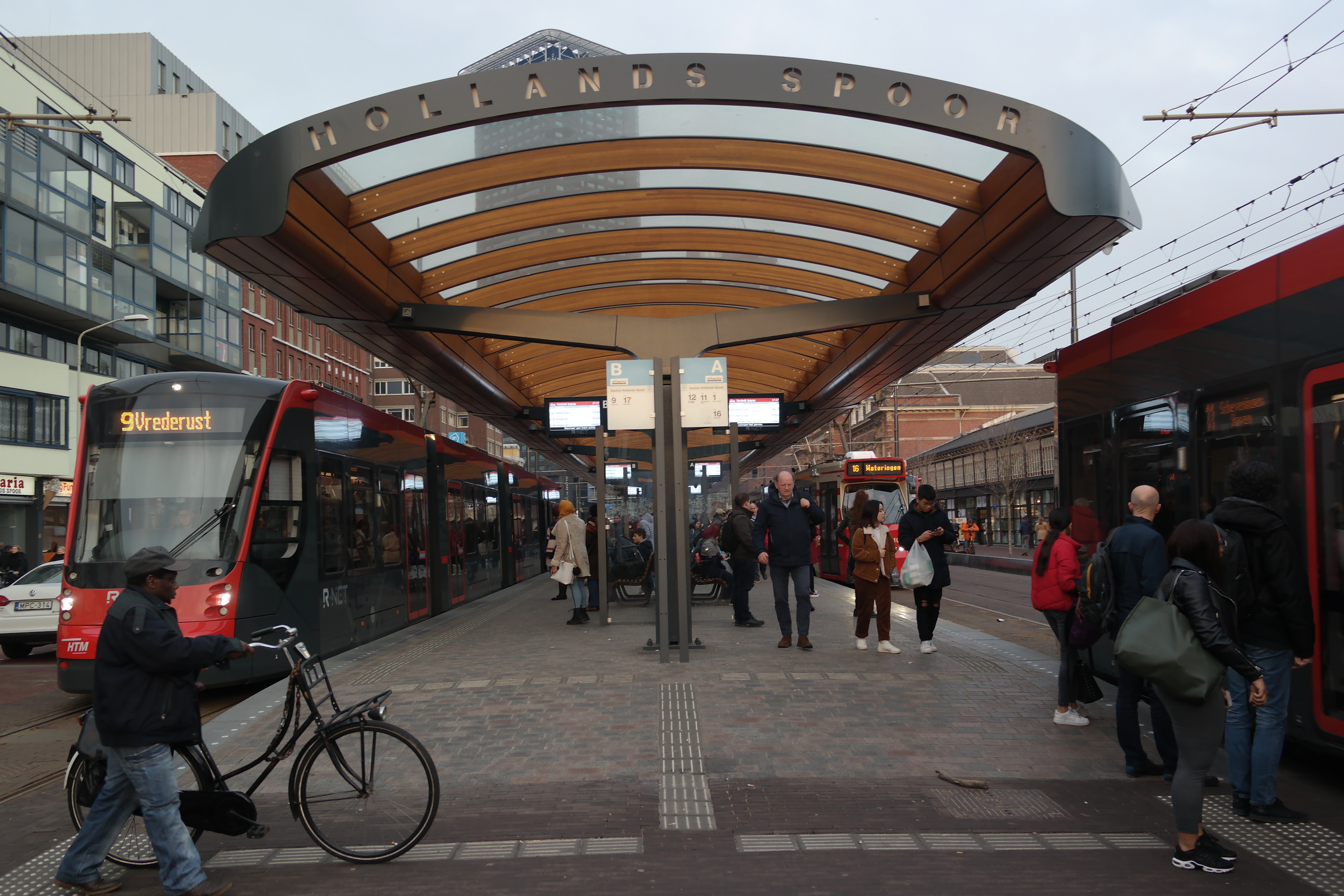
Tram stop in front of Hollands Spoor

The Hague's public transit company, HTM Personenvervoer, operates a public transportation hub in front of the railway station's front entrance. Tram lines 1, 9, 11, 12, 16 and 17 stop here.

Platform	Line	Destination	Via
A	1	Delft Tanthof	Laakkwartier, Rijswijk, Hoornbrug, Broekpolder, Spoorzone Delft, Delft Station, De Hoven Passage
A	11	Scheveningen Haven	Schilderswijk, Haagse Markt, Transvaalkwartier, Regentessekwartier, Statenkwartier
A	12	Den Haag Duindorp	Schilderswijk, Haagse Markt, Transvaalkwartier, Valkenboskwartier, Bomenbuurt, Segbroek, Vogelwijk
B	9	Vrederust	Zuiderpark, Moerwijk, Winkelcentrum Leyweg, Morgenstond
B	16	Wateringen	Laakkwartier, Spoorwijk, Station Moerwijk, Moerwijk, Winkelcentrum Leyweg, Morgenstond, Hoge Veld, Wateringse Veld
B	17	Wateringen	Laakkwartier, Spoorwijk, Plaspoelpolder, Rijswijk Station, In de Bogaard, Eikelenburg, Wateringse Veld
C	1	Scheveningen Noord	Bierkade, Stadhuis, Kneuterdijk, Plein 1813, Javastraat, Vredespaleis, Kurhaus
C	11	Rijswijkseplein	
C	12	Rijswijkseplein	
D	9	Scheveningen Noord	Bierkade, Kalvermarkt-Stadhuis, Centraal Station, Malieveld, Koninginnegracht, Madurodam, Westbroekpark, Circustheater, Kurhaus
D	16	Den Haag Statenkwartier	Bierkade, Kalvermarkt-Stadhuis, Centraal Station, Korte Voorhout, Buitenhof, Zeeheldenkwartier, Gemeentemuseum/Museon
D	17	Den Haag Centraal	Rijswijkseplein

International services:

Line	Route	frequency	Operator
ES	Brussels – Rotterdam – Den Haag HS – Amsterdam – Amersfoort – Bad Bentheim – Berlin – Dresden – Bad Schandau – Prague	three trains pairs per week	European Sleeper

== Bus services ==
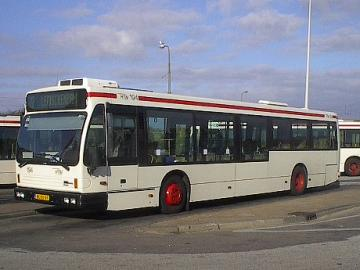
An HTMbuzz bus

Den Haag Hollands Spoor also includes a bus station. Several HTM bus lines stop here.

Platform	Line	Destination	Via
F	18	Clingendael	Stationsbuurt, Centraal Station, Malieveld, Benoordenhout
G	18	Rijswijk De Schilp	Laak, Rijswijk Station, In de Bogaard, Steenvoorde
H	26	Voorburg Station	Binckhorst
H	N5	Rijswijk/Ypenburg/Leidschenveen	Jonckbloetplein, Nootdorp, Station Ypenburg, Rotonde Houtkade, Centraal Station
I	26	Kijkduin	Megastores, Laakkwartier, Station Moerwijk, Zuiderpark, Leyenburg, Loosduinen, Ockenburg
I	N1	Centrum (Buitenhof)	
I	N4	Centrum (Buitenhof)	
