= 1874 Warmond train accident =

Dutch train collision in 1874

Details
- Date: 14 August 1874 c. 10:15 p.m. (local time)
- Location: near Warmond railway station
- Country: Netherlands
- Line: Amsterdam–Haarlem–Rotterdam railway
- Operator: Hollandsche IJzeren Spoorweg-Maatschappij
- Incident type: front-front collision
- Cause: ignoring of red signaling

Statistics
- Trains: 2
- Deaths: 2 (1 more in the aftermath)
- Injured: >30

The 1874 Warmond train accident was a train collision between a passenger train and a freight train at the Amsterdam–Haarlem–Rotterdam railway near Warmond railway station between Leiden and Warmond, in the Netherlands on 14 August 1874. A passenger and one of the drivers were killed, and over 30 passengers were injured. The wife of the train driver died of shock after hearing her husband was killed.

It was at the time the train accident with highest number of victims, and the second deadliest train accident after the 1856 Schiedam train accident.

After the disaster, there was a demand for improving safety measures and for more safety tools on the train. A communication system was developed for the railways to prevent future accidents from occurring.

== Event ==
Passenger train No 32 departed at 9:15 from Rotterdam on the Amsterdam–Haarlem–Rotterdam railway to Amsterdam. After 10:14 p.m., at Warmond train station there was a red signal indicating danger, but the train driver continued. After this station, there was only a single track available due to construction work at one of the bridges. Shortly after, at Warmond train station before the railroad switch, the passenger train collided with a military freight train that was on route from Den Helder to Rotterdam on the same track in the opposite direction. Due to the collision the locomotives were pointed upwards and several carriage were damaged, with all interior power being lost. The middle wagon had the most damage.

=== Rescue work ===
Although the passenger train had a first aid kit and stretchers, the train staff did not know where they were located on the train. After the first aid kit was located, it was noted it contained solely some linen and a bottle of vinegar: no bandages, scissors, or other items that were needed. There were two health officers on the train: J. van Koetsveld and F. Daniels from Amsterdam who were both unharmed. They began performing first aid on the victims. A local doctor from Warmond also arrived to assist, as well as local pastors. No doctors were sent from Haarlem. Warmond railway station became a temporary emergency hospital for the victims. During the night, a train from Haarlem arrived at around 3:00 a.m. to transport the wounded to Amsterdam, though some victims were too badly injured to be transported and remained in Warmond.

== Victims ==
Train driver (No. 13) J.F. Heudikhuijzen of the freight train was thrown against the glass of the locomotive. The health officers van Koetsveld and Daniels tried to revive him, but Heudikhuijzen died shortly after the crash from the effects of glass shards. Passenger Schmedding had severe leg and head injuries and also died shortly after the collision. The wife of the train driver Hedikhuizen died a few day after the accident from the shock of hearing that her husband was killed.

Approximately thirty passengers sustained serious injuries, while many others had minor ones. Among the severely injured were individuals with deep lacerations to the head. A pregnant woman required immediate stitches at the scene. A man from Prinsengracht, Amsterdam, who was traveling with his 14-year-old daughter, suffered a complicated rib fracture. Due to the severity of his injuries, he was treated in Warmond and couldn't be transported back to Amsterdam. His daughter was unharmed.

The train driver and the stoker of the passenger train were able to jump from the train before the collision. Traumatized by the accident, the stoker chose to leave his role and became the stoker for the ship "Admiraal Tengbergen I". The following year on the night of 4 May 1875, during the week of the court appeal, he drowned in Doesburg. Despite an extensive search, his body wasn't located until more than a day later. The cause was indicated as “presumably to be sleepwalking into the water”.

Some damaged carriages were transported to Leiden in the week after the accident. The locomotive and other carriages were moved to the workshop in Haarlem.

In August 1874 the two health officers van Koetsveld and Daniels were awarded a lifetime free railway ticket for all lines of the Hollandsche IJzeren Spoorweg-Maatschappij. In October 1874, Daniels also received an official statement of satisfaction from the Minister of War for his services during the accident.

== Reactions ==
After the collision, some passengers were trapped inside the train. Realizing there were no tools on board to assist in their rescue, a public demand emerged through the media for trains to be equipped with necessary escape tools. Additionally, questions arose about whether a switchman should be the sole individual responsible for such a crucial task, given the significant consequences of a single mistake.

== Investigation and lawsuit ==
On 15 and 16 January 1875 there were witness hearings at the district court of Leiden. Of the 32 people that were called up 20 people were heard, including witnesses, engineers as experts, and railway company employees. The witness hearing was mainly about the signals at the station and the actions of the train driver D.G.J. Roesink and the stoker. The train driver stated that he had seen a red light, but that due to a failure of the brakes he was not able to stop. On 18 January 1875 a prison sentence of 10 months was demanded. On 25 January 1875 the district court of Leiden sentenced the train driver of the passenger train to six months in prison for “unintentionally creating a danger to a railway train”. On 2 May 1875 an appeal was taken into consideration, but was declared inadmissible on 9 May 1875.

== Measures ==
In December 1874, a few months after the accident, C. E. Plugge of Middelburg invented a method, which also worked in darkness, whereby train drivers could be warned if they became inattentive. It was specifically stated that this invention could have prevented the Warmond accident. Plugge created a working miniature prototype and offered this invention to the Dutch Government. The prototype was further developed and could be installed in trains by April 1875.

The invention worked as follows: A line hung from the train cab through the entire train. Pull lines with handles were attached in each carriage to the line, which were within reach of passengers. When the line was pulled a flag appears at that carriage and a hammer is released that strikes a bell next to the train driver. The costs for the system was low, at 15 Dutch Guilder for the bell plus 25 per carriage for installing the warning signal.
