= Schiedam train accident =

Schiedam train accident may refer to:

- 1856 Schiedam train accident, a train accident in 1856
- 1976 Schiedam train accident, a train accident in 1976
