= Den Haag Moerwijk railway station =

Railway station in The Hague, Netherlands

Den Haag Moerwijk
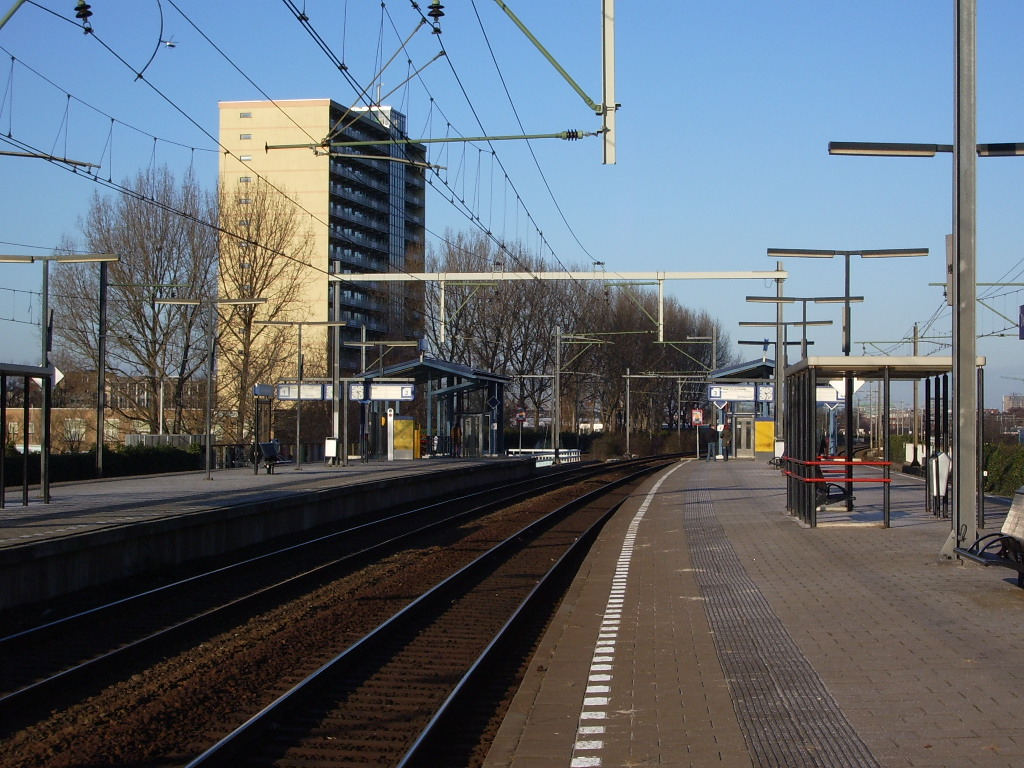

General information
- Location: The Hague; Netherlands
- Coordinates: 52°3′12″N 4°18′31″E
- Operator: Nederlandse Spoorwegen
- Line: Amsterdam–Rotterdam railway
- Platforms: 4

Other information
- Station code: Gvmw

History
- Opened: 2 June 1996; 30 years ago

Services
Preceding station	Nederlandse Spoorwegen	Following station
Den Haag HS towards Den Haag Centraal	NS Sprinter 5000 Mon-Fri until 20:00	Rijswijk towards Dordrecht
Den Haag HS towards Den Haag Centraal	NS Sprinter 5100	Rijswijk towards Dordrecht
Den Haag HS towards Den Haag Centraal	NS Sprinter 5200 Mon-Thu until 19:00	Rijswijk towards Dordrecht
Location
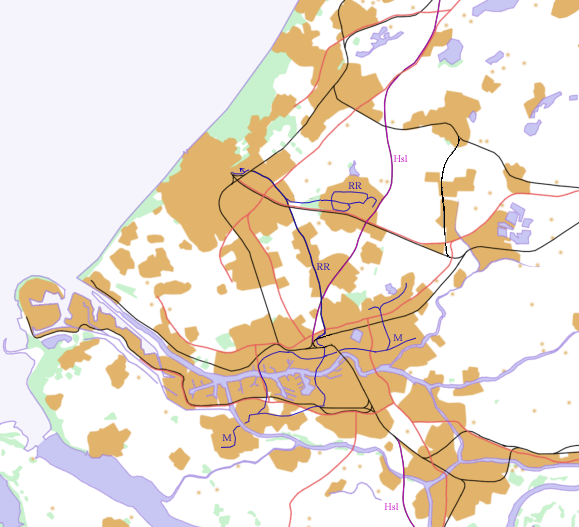
- Location within Southwest Randstad Location within Netherlands

Den Haag Moerwijk is a railway station in the Moerwijk district of The Hague, South Holland, Netherlands. It opened on 2 June 1996.

== Train services ==
The following services stop at Den Haag Moerwijk:

- 4x per hour local service (Sprinter) The Hague - Rotterdam - Dordrecht. The Sprinter calls only twice per hour during evenings and on weekends.

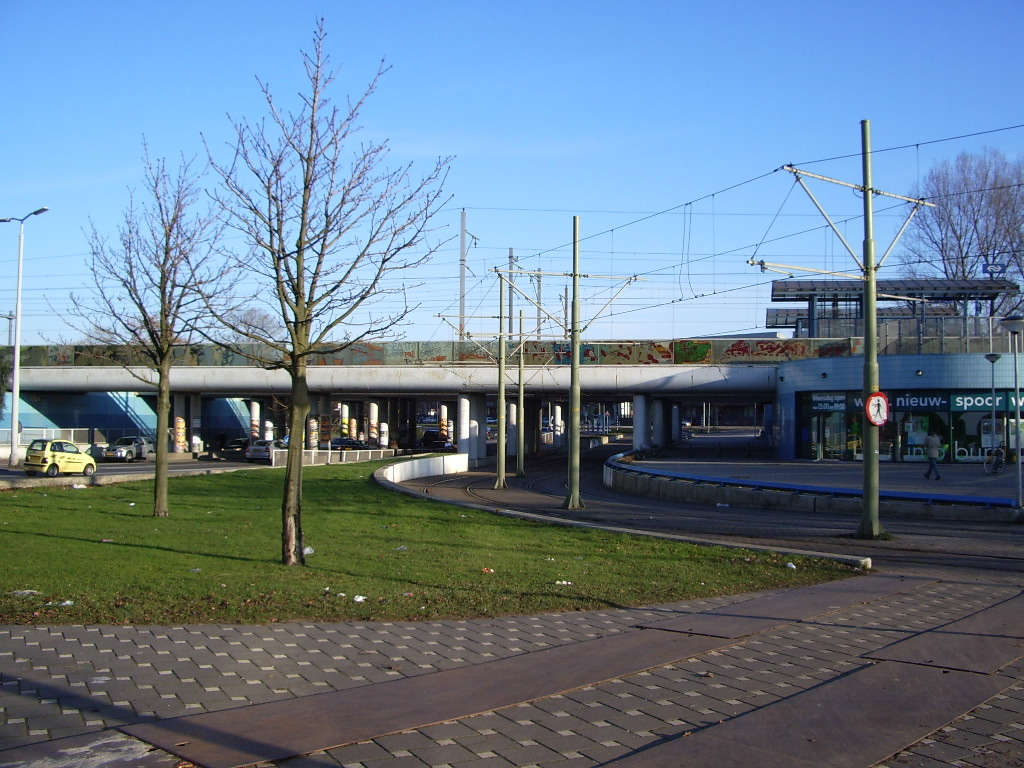
North side of the railway station

== Tram services ==
Tram line 16 stops at the station, this line runs from Wateringen to the city centre.
