= Laak, The Hague =

District of The Hague, Netherlands

Coordinates: 52°03′55″N 4°19′47″E

Laak
- District of The Hague
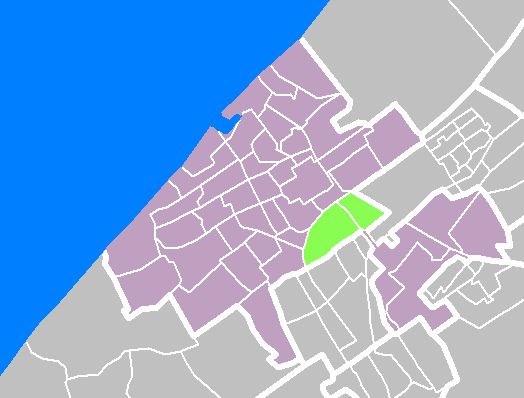
- Laak in The Hague
- Country: Netherlands
- Province: South Holland
- Municipality: The Hague

Area
  - Total: 426.3 ha (1,053 acres)
  - Land: 398.7 ha (985 acres)

Population (1 January 2026)
  - Total: 48,862
  - Density: 12,260/km^{2} (31,740/sq mi)

Laak (Dutch pronunciation: [laːk]) is district of The Hague, Netherlands. With a population of 48,862 and an area of 4.3 square kilometres (1.7 sq mi), it is the smallest and least populous of the city's eight districts. The district is officially divided into three neighbourhoods: Laakkwartier, Spoorwijk and Binckhorst. The Hague University of Applied Sciences can be found in Laak.

The municipality of The Hague bought the area from the municipality of Rijswijk in 1844. The Amsterdam–Haarlem–Rotterdam railway was constructed in this polder, together with the railway station Hollands Spoor. In the period between 1915 and 1935, the municipality developed a residential neighbourhood in Laak, designed by Dutch architect Berlage.
