= Jan Bastiaan Molewater =

Dutch physician (1813–1864)

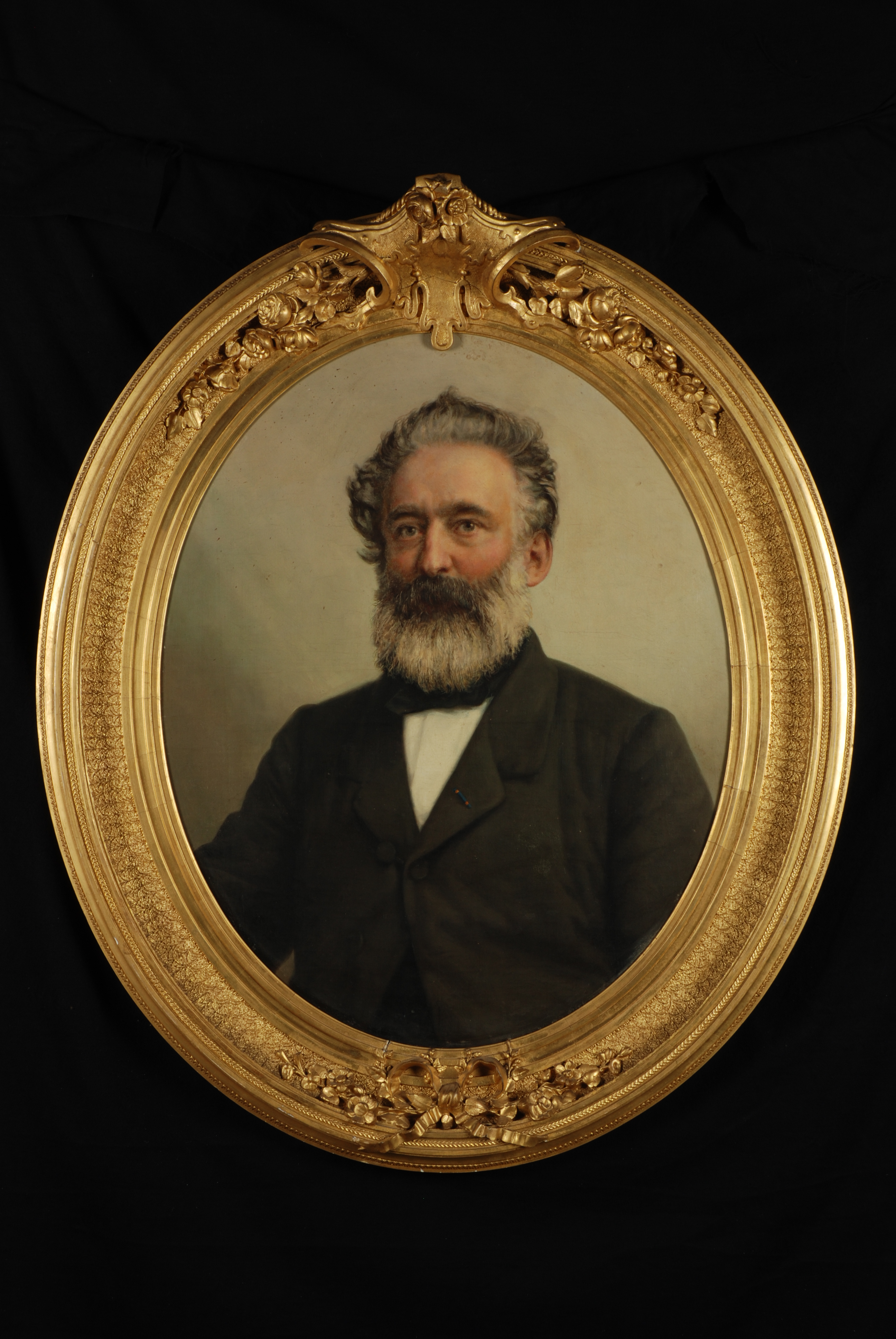
- Portrait painting in Museum Rotterdam
- Born: 16 August 1813; Rotterdam, Netherlands
- Died: 9 December 1864 (aged 51); Rotterdam, Netherlands
- Occupations: Physician, lecturer, administrator
- Known for: Director of the Coolsingel Hospital (now called Erasmus MC), founder of the Rotterdam Institute for the Deaf and Dumb
- Spouse: Jeanne Guillemine Louise Rose

Jan Bastiaan Molewater (16 August 1813 – 9 December 1864) was a Dutch medical doctor, lecturer and administrator. He served as the first medical director of the Coolsingel Hospital in Rotterdam and played a leading role in founding the city's Institute for the Deaf and Dumb.

== Early life and education ==
Molewater was born in Rotterdam, the son of Adriaan Molewater, a tax receiver, and Johanna Cornelia van Alphen. From 1826 to 1830 he studied at the Noorthey Institute under Petrus de Raadt. In 1830 he enrolled at Leiden University as a law student, but soon turned to medicine while also pursuing natural sciences, philosophy, and literature. He was popular among fellow students and took an active part in student life.

On 1 July 1840 he received the degree of doctor of medicine with a dissertation entitled De typho abdominali sive febre typhoidea. After graduating he returned to Rotterdam, where he quickly established a large practice and joined a number of scientific and cultural societies. He was among the first board members of the Society for the Advancement of Medicine and a co-founder of the Rotterdam Scientific Institute.

== Career ==
On 22 March 1848 Molewater was appointed director of the new municipal hospital in Rotterdam, later known as the Coolsingel Hospital (now called Erasmus MC). The building, designed by his future father-in-law Willem Nicolaas Rose, was completed in 1851 with its interior arranged according to Molewater’s plans. That year he also became lecturer in practical medicine at the Rotterdam Medical School. In 1852 he enrolled again at Leiden to study surgery, in which he later took a doctorate. In August 1856 he led the rapid care of the victims of the 1856 Schiedam train accident that was afterwards praised in the media.

Through a speech on 17 March 1852 he gave the decisive impetus to the founding of the Rotterdam Institute for the Deaf and Dumb. He was elected chairman of its board in 1853 and remained in that position until his death, regarded as the driving force of the institution.

Molewater was active in many other organizations. He served as secretary of the Society for the Advancement of Industry, as a board member of the Academy of Fine Arts and Technical Sciences, and as a member of the Provincial Medical Commission in Dordrecht. He was also a member of the Provincial Utrecht Society, the Batavian Society in Rotterdam, and an honorary member of the medical society Disce Docendus Adhuc. He was a knight of the Order of the Netherlands Lion.

== Personal life and death ==
On 7 May 1851 Molewater married Jeanne Guillemine Louise Rose, daughter of Willem Nicolaas Rose and Johanna Maria van Alphen. The couple had four surviving daughters.

Molewater died in Rotterdam on 9 December 1864 after an illness for which he had sought recovery in Italy earlier that year.

== Publications ==
Molewater wrote little. Apart from official reports, one of his few printed works was a description of the Rotterdam Hospital in the volume Rotterdam geschetst in zijne voornaamste gebouwen, kerken en gestichten (Rotterdam, 1863).
