= 1856 Schiedam train accident =

Railway incident in the Netherlands

Schiedam train accident

Details
- Date: 10 August 1856 c. 11:20 pm (local time)
- Location: near Delfshaven between Schiedam Centrum station and Rotterdam Centraal station
- Country: Netherlands
- Line: Amsterdam–Haarlem–Rotterdam railway
- Operator: Hollandsche IJzeren Spoorweg-Maatschappij
- Incident type: front-tail collision
- Cause: absence of signaling

Statistics
- Trains: 2
- Deaths: 3
- Injured: 9 (5 severe)
- Damage: 3 carriages

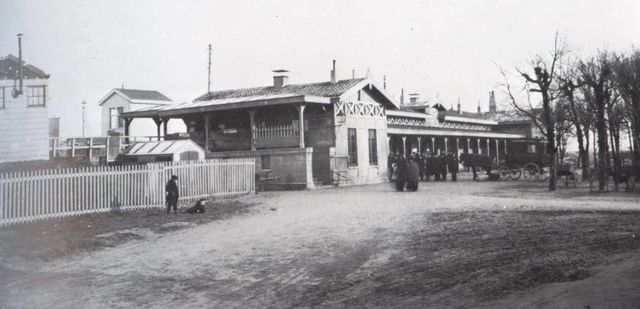
Schiedam train station (1847-1889)

On 10 August, 1856 two passenger trains collided at the Amsterdam–Haarlem–Rotterdam railway near Delfshaven between Schiedam Centrum station and Rotterdam Centraal station, the Netherlands. Two carriages where destroyed with a third being severely damaged. Three passengers lost their lives and at least nine were injured.

It was the first train disaster in the Netherlands and the first Dutch train disaster where passengers were killed.

After the disaster, there was a demand for improving safety measures. The directors of the railways were heavily criticized following the crash, but after some time, no new safety measures were implemented and a similar crash was narrowly avoided. Later, a signalling block system was installed and all trains were fitted with a tail lamp to prevent such accidents.

== Event ==
In the evening of Sunday 10 August 1856, the second-last train from Amsterdam to Rotterdam of the Hollandsche IJzeren Spoorweg-Maatschappij on the Amsterdam–Haarlem–Rotterdam railway departed with a delay from Den Haag Hollands Spoor. It was further delayed because it was busy at all stations that evening. The train left Schiedam Centrum station at 23:07 p.m. local time. After the train departed, the station master of Schiedam Centrum Station kept the last train from The Hague waiting for seven minutes before it was allowed to continue. There was no track security at that time. A passenger train was only allowed to depart 10 minutes after the preceding train. However, the station master released the train three minutes early.

The first train stopped near Delfshaven after hitting a carriage on the tracks, but moved on after a few minutes. While the train got up to speed, the other train rammed it from behind. The last two carriages of the second train were derailed and a third one was partly shattered but stayed attached. The train driver of the first train didn't notice the crash and continued to Rotterdam.

The train arrived a half shattered carriage.The two passengers in the derailed rear carriage had been thrown out of the carriage and were minorly injured. The carriage with third class passengers was completely destroyed. From the eight or nine people that were in the carriage, three died. The other passengers were injured. Five were seriously injured and other passengers had minor injuries. Another newspaper article reported four deaths and nine injuries.

=== Rescue work ===
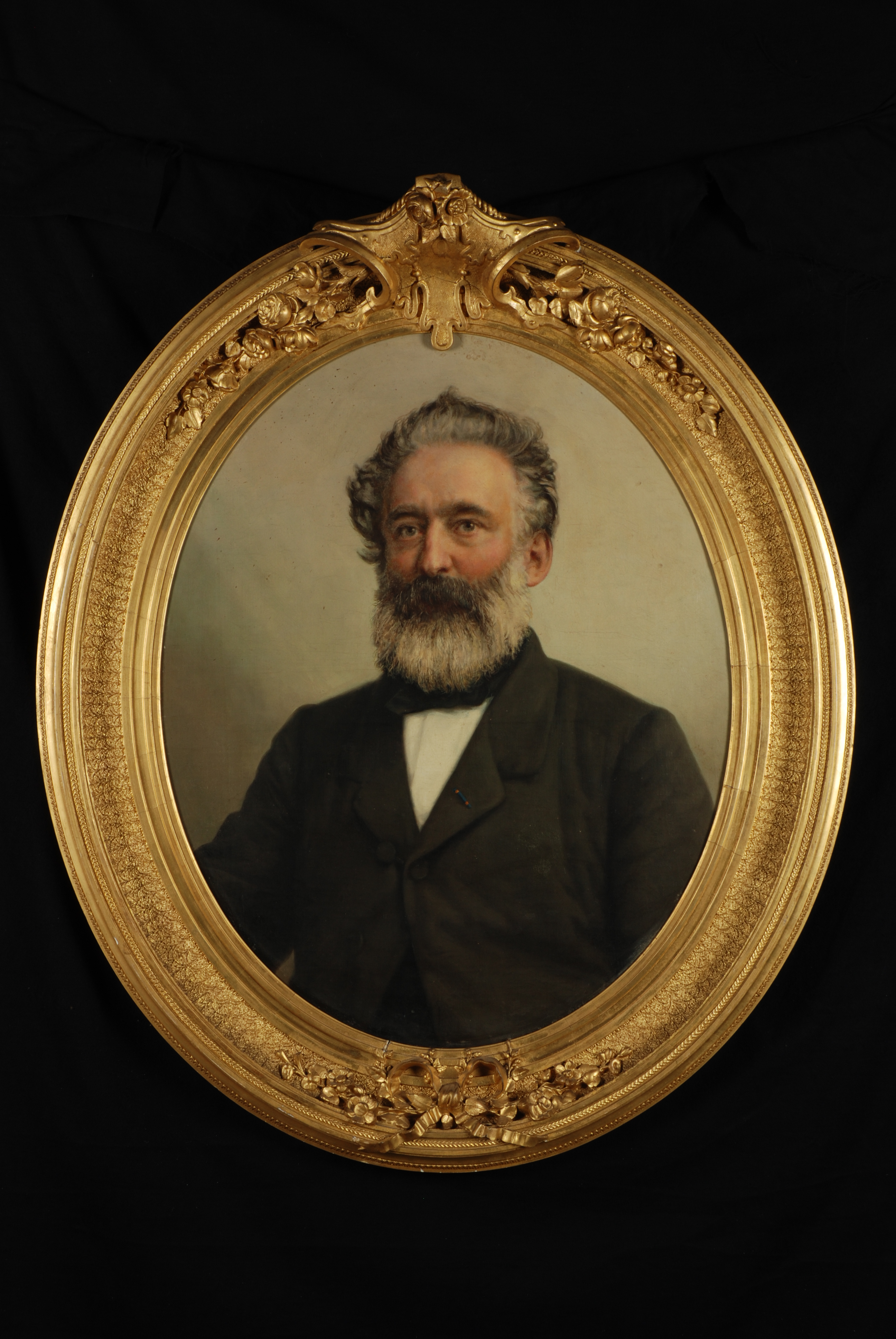
Hospital director Jan Bastiaan Molewater of the Coolsingelziekenhuis who led the treatment care

After the train had arrived in Rotterdam and the damage was seen, station manager mr. Roosdorp took a locomotive to the scene of the crash. Physicians who arrived at the scene provided first aid. The dead and four seriously injured passengers were taken in a carriage of the last train, and were transported to Rotterdam Station where they arrived at 12:45 a.m. local time. From there they were transported to the Coolsingelziekenhuis. The rapid care at the hospital was personally led by hospital director Jan Bastiaan Molewater. The care provided by the hospital was praised in the media. That night, all necessary surgeries and amputations were done by 4:00 a.m. local time.

== Victims ==
The people who were killed were

- Hendrik van der Kolk from Rotterdam who was organist in Delft.
- Cornelis Geenemans, billiard maker who was born and lived in The Hague.
- C.W.M. Steinheuer from Amsterdam.

Four people needed surgery or amputations at the Coolsingelziekenhuis in Rotterdam and one person was hospitalized in Schiedam. These people were:

- Jacobus Molenaar, a 35-years old carpenter who was born in Woerden and lived in Hellevoetsluis. He had head and back injuries.
- Jacobus Paulus de Heer, a 23-years old carpenter. He was born and lived in The Hague and worked in Hellevoetsluis. He had arm injuries.
- Nicolaas Nieuwenhout, a 28-years old billiard maker who lived in The Hague. He had head and legs injuries.
- Maria Verhagen, a 45-years old maid who was born in Utrecht and worked in Rotterdam. She was reported death by one source, but not confirmed by other and later sources. She had severe leg injuries.
- An unnamed person was hospitalized in Schiedam.

== Reactions and aftermath ==
Justice and the board of directors of the railway launched an investigation. A key factor was the lack of a safety lamp on the first train. One of the passengers that lost his arms in the crash was offered from the society an amount of 186 Dutch Guilder "as a gift," but the passenger refused the money because it was too little.

At the time of the crash, the trains only had time intervals as safety measures. There were demands in the media for better security measures. Working with time intervals is not safe enough as a similar crash almost happened a month after the accident. In September 1856, the directors of the railways were accused by the Arnhemsche Courant of carelessness after no new safety measures had been implemented. Media pressure continued to mount. Eventually, a signalling block system was installed and all trains got a tail lamp. A red light was fixed to end of train indicating the back of a train and showing whether the train is still complete.
