= Rijswijk railway station =

Station in the Netherlands

Rijswijk
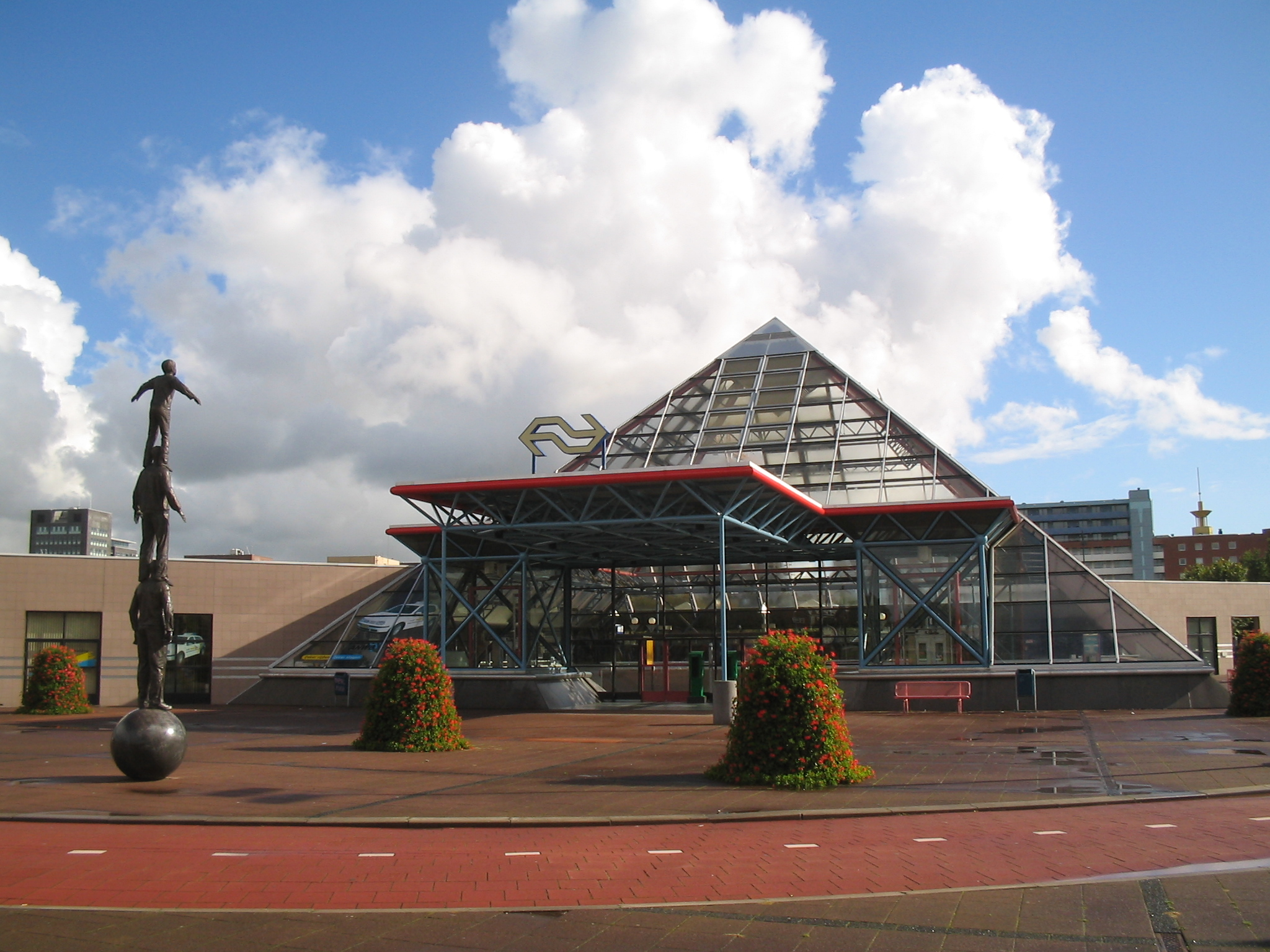

General information
- Location: Netherlands
- Coordinates: 52°02′22″N 4°19′11″E
- Line: Amsterdam–Rotterdam railway

Construction
- Structure type: Underground

History
- Opened: 1965; 61 years ago

Services
Preceding station	Nederlandse Spoorwegen	Following station
Den Haag Moerwijk towards Den Haag Centraal	NS Sprinter 5000 Mon-Fri until 20:00	Delft towards Dordrecht
Den Haag Moerwijk towards Den Haag Centraal	NS Sprinter 5100	Delft towards Dordrecht
Den Haag Moerwijk towards Den Haag Centraal	NS Sprinter 5200 Mon-Thu until 19:00	Delft towards Dordrecht
Location
- Location within Netherlands

Rijswijk is a railway station located in Rijswijk in the suburbs of The Hague, Netherlands. The station was opened on 3 June 1847 and is located on the Amsterdam–Rotterdam railway, between The Hague and Rotterdam. It was later enlarged, and then closed in 1938. In 1965 it opened in a different location.

The station has been in a tunnel since 1996, with four tracks and four platforms. The northern entrance is a modern glass pyramid protruding from the ground, not unlike that of the Louvre, while the southern entrance, on Winston Churchilllaan, is combined with a local bus and tram station.

In May 2016, traveling organisation Rover held a survey in which Rijswijk came in as the most uncomfortable railway station in the Netherlands.

== Train services ==
The following services currently call at Rijswijk:

- 2x per hour local service (sprinter) The Hague - Rotterdam - Dordrecht - Breda
- 2x per hour local service (sprinter) The Hague - Rotterdam - Dordrecht - Roosendaal

== Images ==
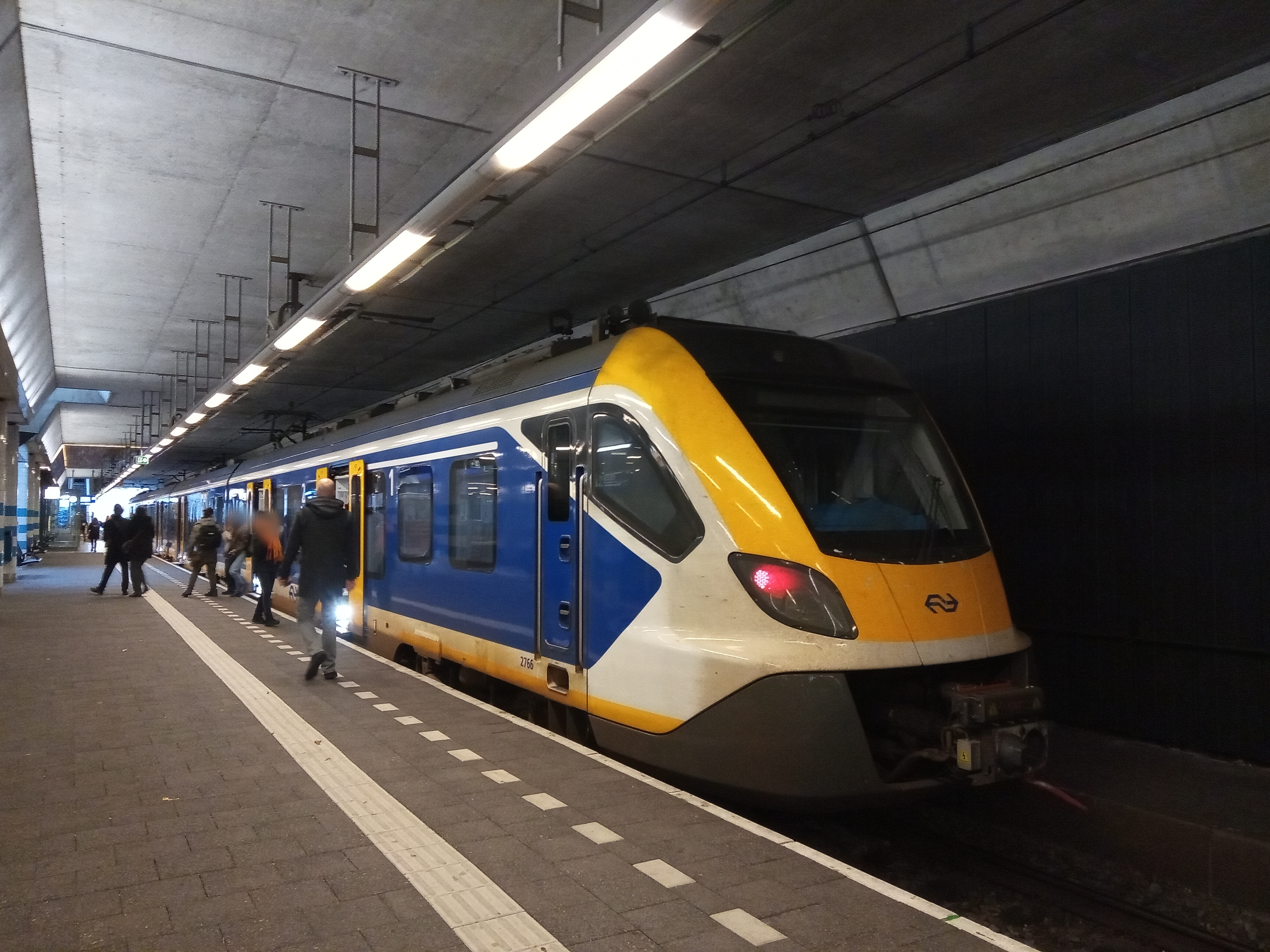
Sprinter at the station.

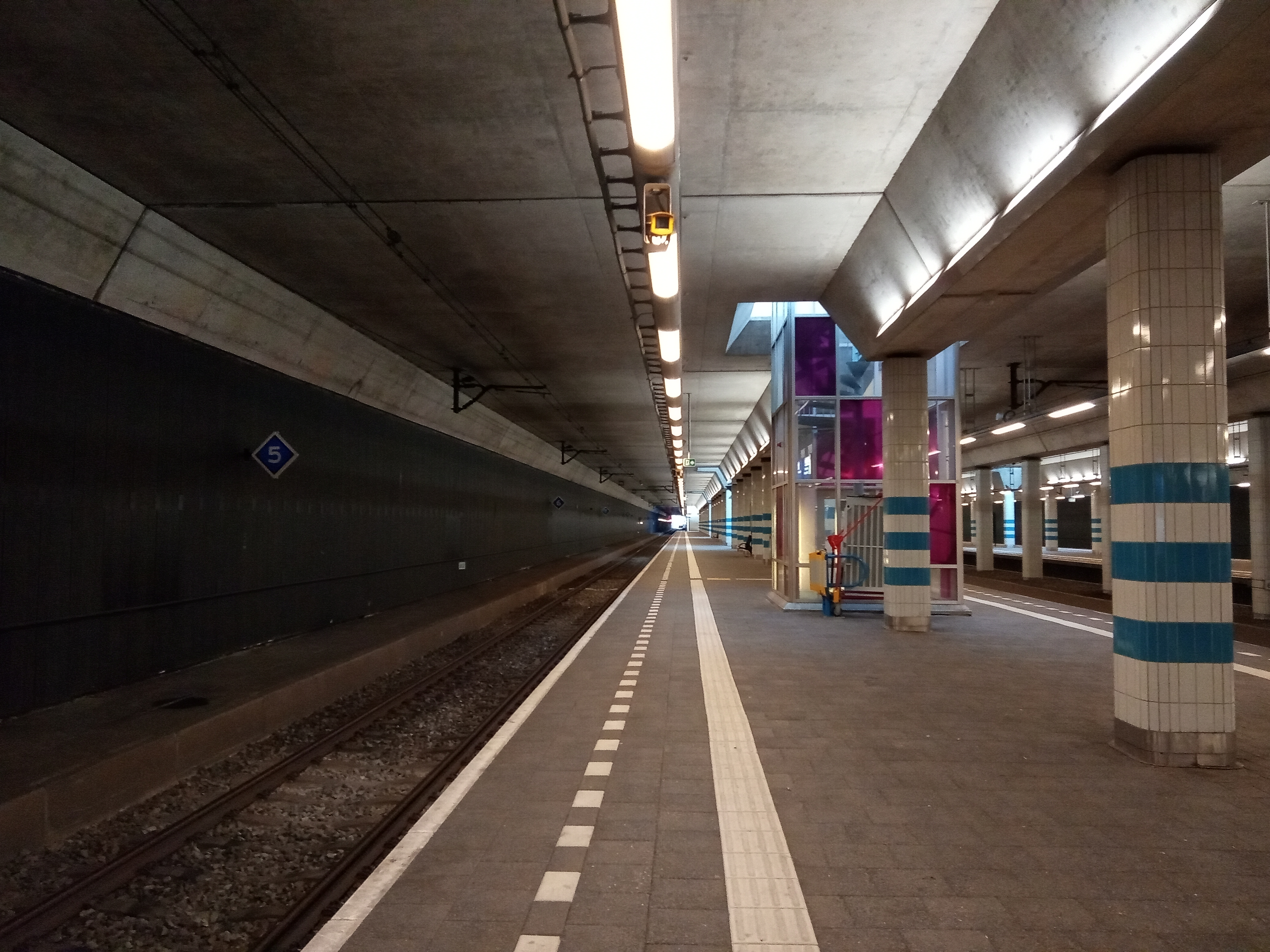
Platform.

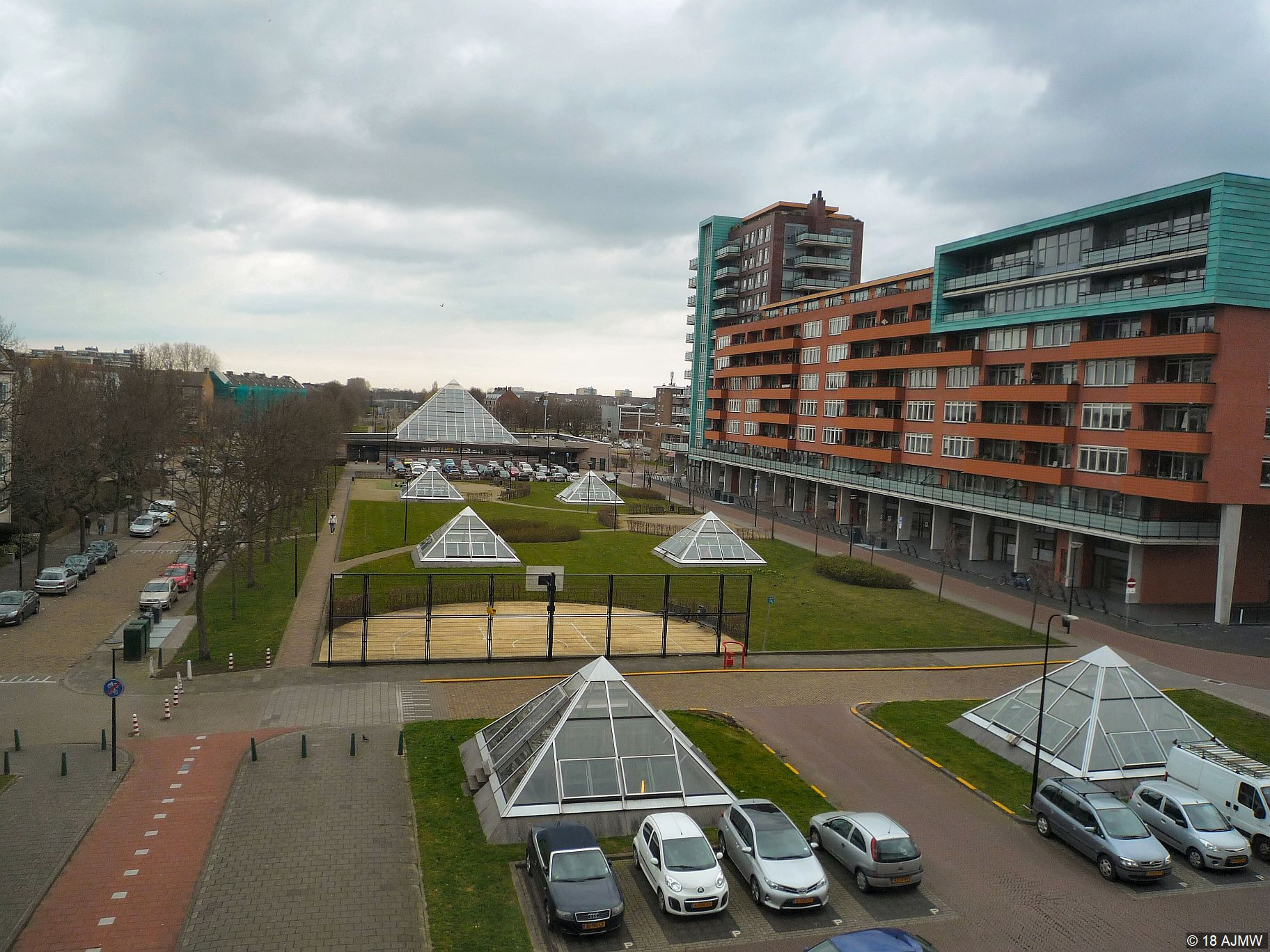
Glass pyramids of the station.
