= Tanthof =

Coordinates: 51°59′00″N 4°21′44″E

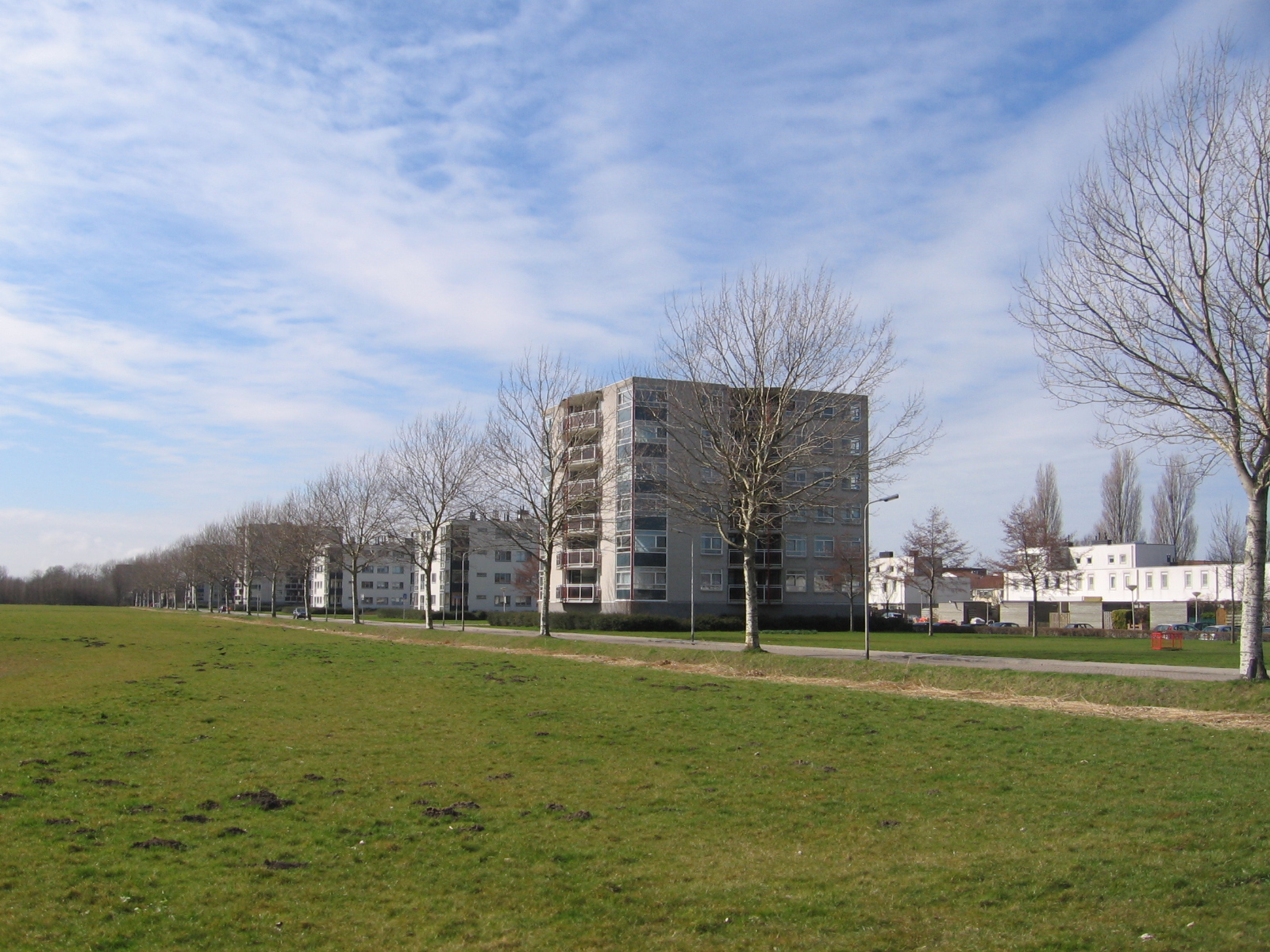
- Southern border of Tanthof-Oost
- Nickname: de Tanthof
- Tanthof-West Tanthof-Oost
- Country: Netherlands
- Province: South Holland
- City: Delft

Area
  - Total: 2.33 km^{2} (0.90 sq mi)

Population (2023)
  - Total: 14 090
  - Density: 6/km^{2} (16/sq mi)

Tanthof (colloquially known as de Tanthof) is a quarter in the South of Delft, the Netherlands. It was built in the 1970s and 1980s and consists mainly of low-rise buildings. The area is divided in two parts, Tanthof-East and Tanthof-West.

== West and East ==
Tanthof-West and Tanthof-East were separated on purpose by the old road to Abtswoude, in the South of Delft. These two areas are directly connected to each other only for pedestrians and bicyclists. When the quarter was designed, the architects followed the old creeks. The houses in these two separate areas have very different architectures.

More than half of the houses in Tanthof-East were built for single-family dwellings. About one third of the population lives in a traditional family setting. Tanthof-West is an area with a high number of young people and young infants. There are three elementary schools and three kindergartens.

== The facilities ==
On the border between East and West is a petting zoo with a water playground. Next to the petting zoo is the aptly named skatepark "De Border". There is a tennis court on 'Straat van Malakka', a sports hall on 'Fretstraat' and there is a sports complex in the South of Tanthof-East. In Tanthof-East, there is a shopping centre on 'Dasstraat' and Tanthof-West got its shopping area on 'Bikolaan'. The distance between Tanthof and the centre of Delft is approximately three kilometres; it is easily accessible by bicycle. Delft University of Technology is only ten minutes away by bicycle. The Delft Campus railway station lies next to Tanthof-East.

== Trivia ==
The sand needed for building Tanthof was dug up from the area now called Delftse Hout. This area is nowadays a recreational area with some lakes.

As of January 1, 2023, Tanthof West recorded a population of 8 025 people, residing in 3 794 households while Tanthof East recorded a population of 6 065 people, residing in 3 000 households. This contributed to 13% of the total population of Delft.

South to Tanthof is a recreational area called Abtswoudse Bos.
