= Delft railway station =

Railway station in Delft, Netherlands

Delft
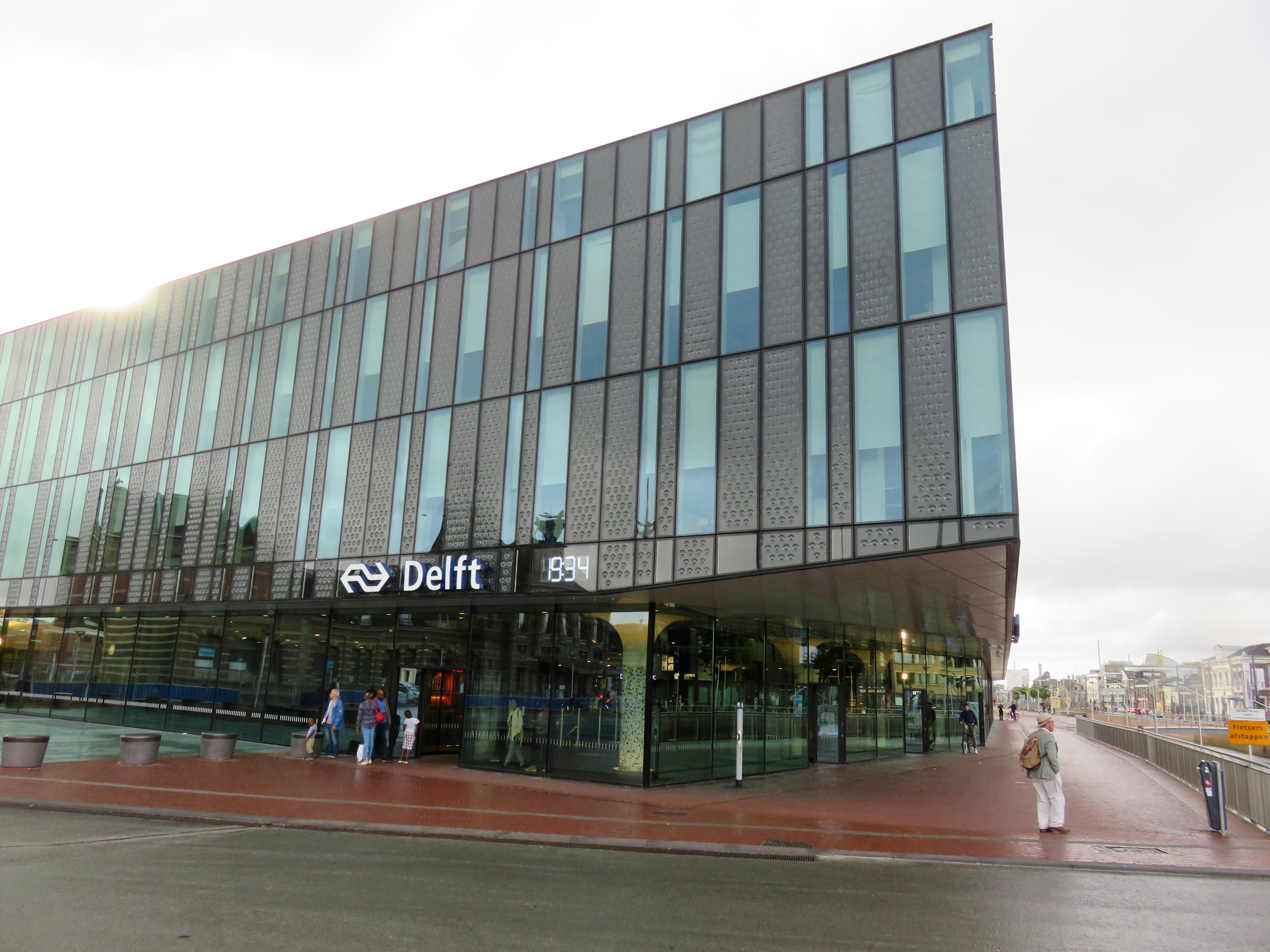
- Building giving access to the underground platform

General information
- Location: Delft, Netherlands
- Coordinates: 52°00′24″N 4°21′24″E
- Operator: Nederlandse Spoorwegen
- Line: Amsterdam–Rotterdam railway
- Platforms: 2 island platforms
- Tracks: 4
- Bus stands: 8
- Connections: HTM Den Haag Tram: 1, 19; HTM: N5; RET: 40, 174; EBS: 33, 37, 53, 60, 61, 62, 63 64, 69, 455

Construction
- Structure type: Underground
- Cycle facilities: Free parking for 8,700 bicycles, of which 5,000 underground
- Architect: Francine Houben (Mecanoo)

Other information
- Station code: Dt

History
- Opened: 31 May 1847
- Rebuilt: 1885, 2015

Services
Preceding station	Nederlandse Spoorwegen	Following station
Den Haag HS towards Den Haag Centraal	NS Intercity 1100	Rotterdam Centraal towards Eindhoven Centraal
Den Haag HS towards Utrecht Centraal	NS Nachtnet 1400 Night train	Rotterdam Centraal Terminus
Den Haag HS towards Amsterdam Centraal	NS Intercity 2200	Schiedam Centrum towards Vlissingen
Den Haag HS towards Amsterdam Centraal	NS Intercity 2300 Mon-Fri until 20:00	Schiedam Centrum towards Vlissingen
Den Haag HS towards Rotterdam Centraal	NS Intercity 3200 Mon-Thurs before 19:00	Rotterdam Centraal towards Arnhem Centraal
Den Haag HS towards Venlo	NS Intercity 3500	Schiedam Centrum towards Dordrecht
Rijswijk towards Dordrecht	NS Sprinter 5000 Mon-Fri until 20:00	Delft Campus towards Den Haag Centraal
Rijswijk towards Den Haag Centraal	NS Sprinter 5100	Delft Campus towards Dordrecht
Rijswijk towards Den Haag Centraal	NS Sprinter 5200 Mon-Thu until 19:00	Delft Campus towards Dordrecht
Location
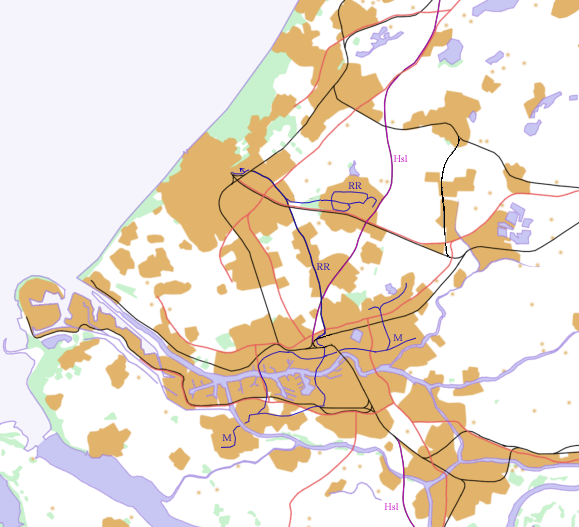
- Location within Southwest Randstad Location within Netherlands

Delft is the main railway station of the city of Delft, South Holland, Netherlands. It is located on the oldest railway line in the country, between the stations of The Hague Central and Rotterdam Central. Along with a new 2.3 km rail tunnel under the city centre, the current station opened on 28 February 2015. The new building, which integrates the station hall with the city's municipal offices, was designed by Mecanoo, an international architecture firm that originated in Delft. The project also included a rebuilt bus station, tram stops and improved bicycle parking.

== 1885 building ==
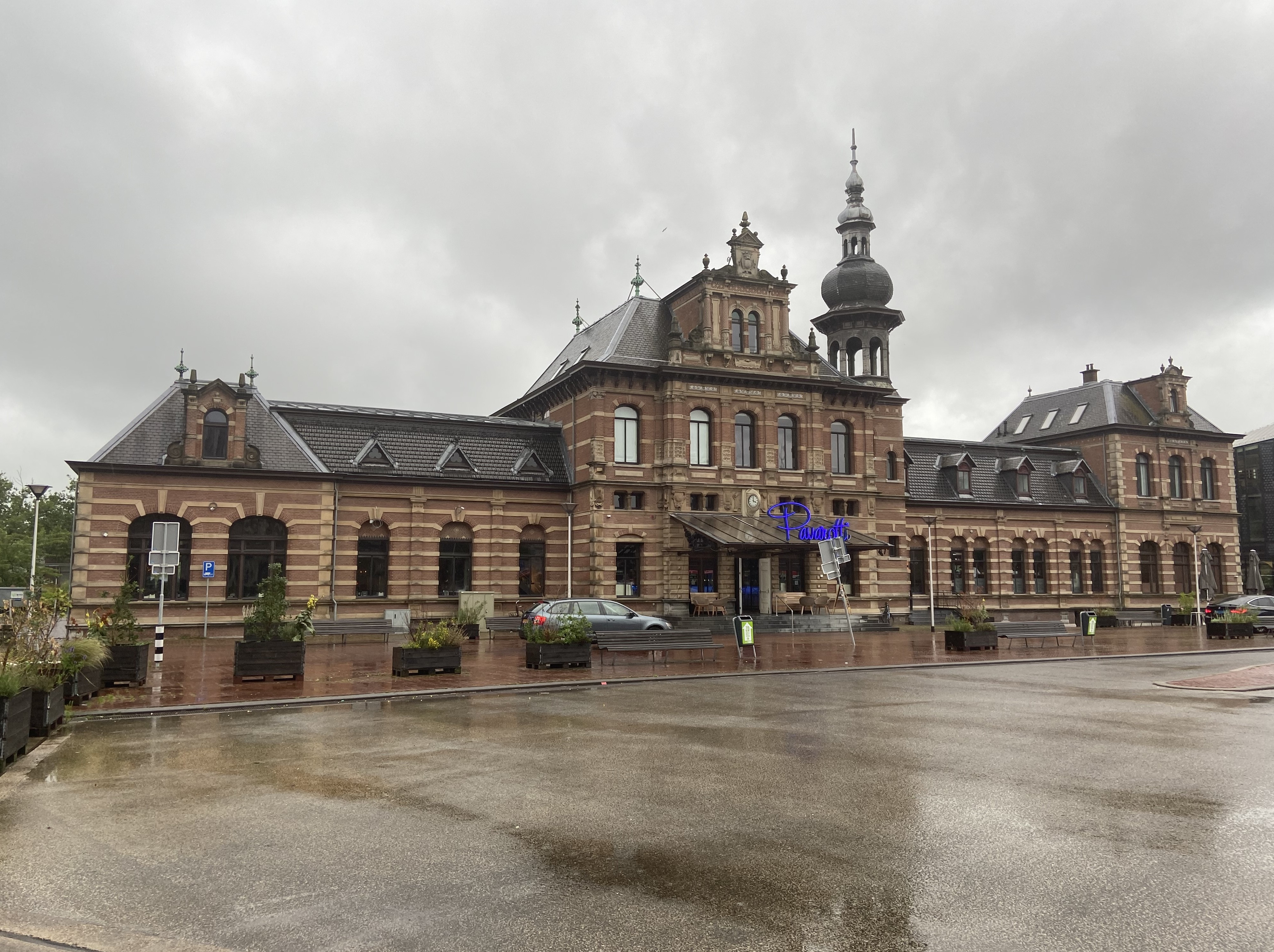
The 1885 Delft station building (2023)

The initial Delft railway station was located on the Houttuinen, close to the current building. The first train passed through it on 31 May 1847, and three days later the station opened to the public. Because of increasing numbers of passengers and goods transported, a new, larger railway station opened in 1885, just to the south of the original station. Christiaan Posthumus Meyjes, Sr. designed the latter building. This building was used until 2015 when the current building opened. The old station building is historically significant, and since 2018 has been occupied by an Italian restaurant.

== Railway zone project ==
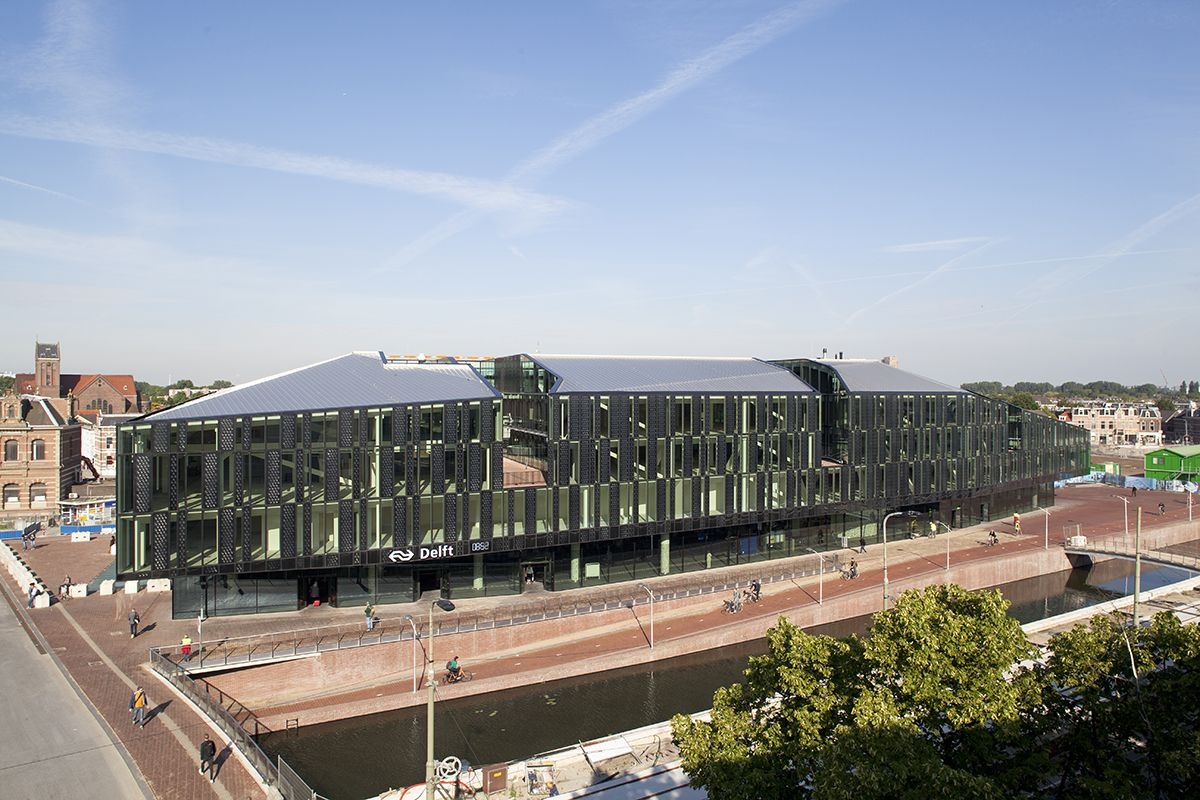
New station opened in 2015

From 1964, the railway through Delft ran on a double track viaduct, created to eliminate level crossings, intending to improve the safety and fluidity of traffic through the city. However, the rail viaduct became unpopular for being visually unattractive, and because the line through Delft is busy—with between 300 and 350 trains passing daily—causing major noise pollution. A large urban design project was formulated in 1999, designed by Spanish urban planner Joan Busquets, which saw the rail viaduct replaced by two tunnels.

The first phase was completed in February 2015, and brought the first tunnel with two rail tracks in operation. In 2015 the decommissioned viaduct was torn down, and a second tunnel with two more rail tracks was constructed underneath the path it previously occupied.

Currently the tunnel with the third and fourth tracks is complete and the above-ground railway lines have been altered to join the extra underground rails.

== Gallery ==
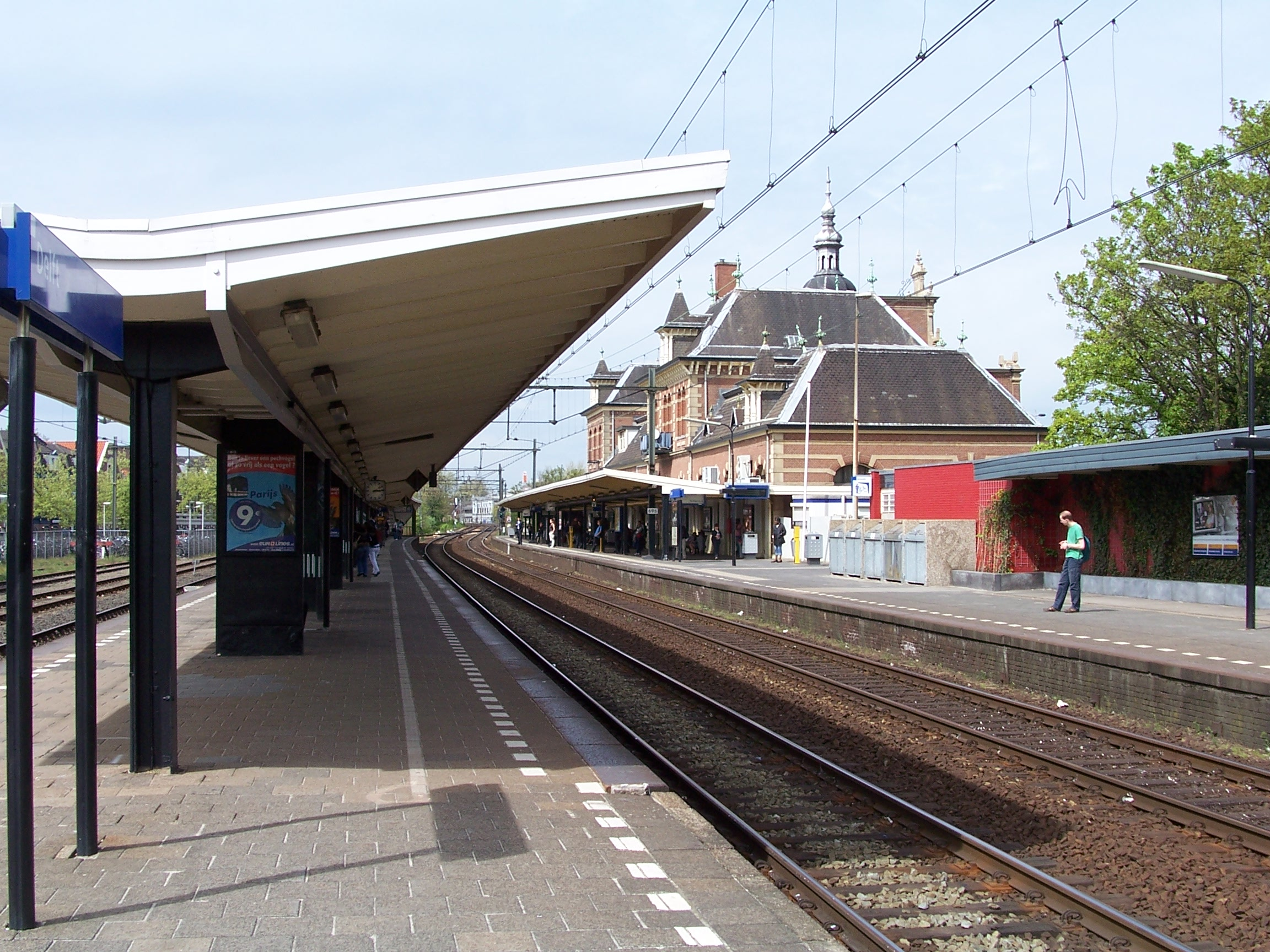
Old station's platforms

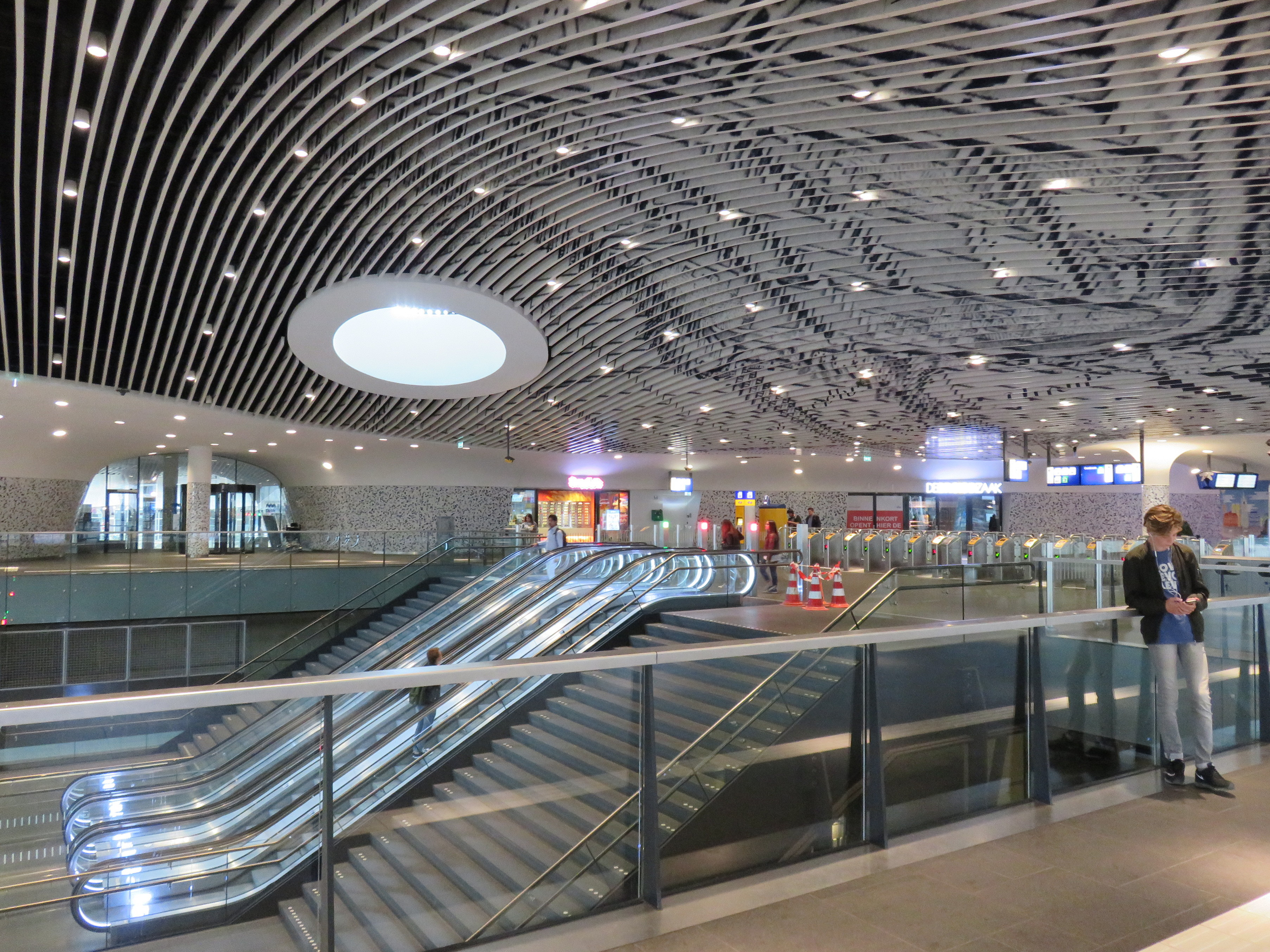
New station hall

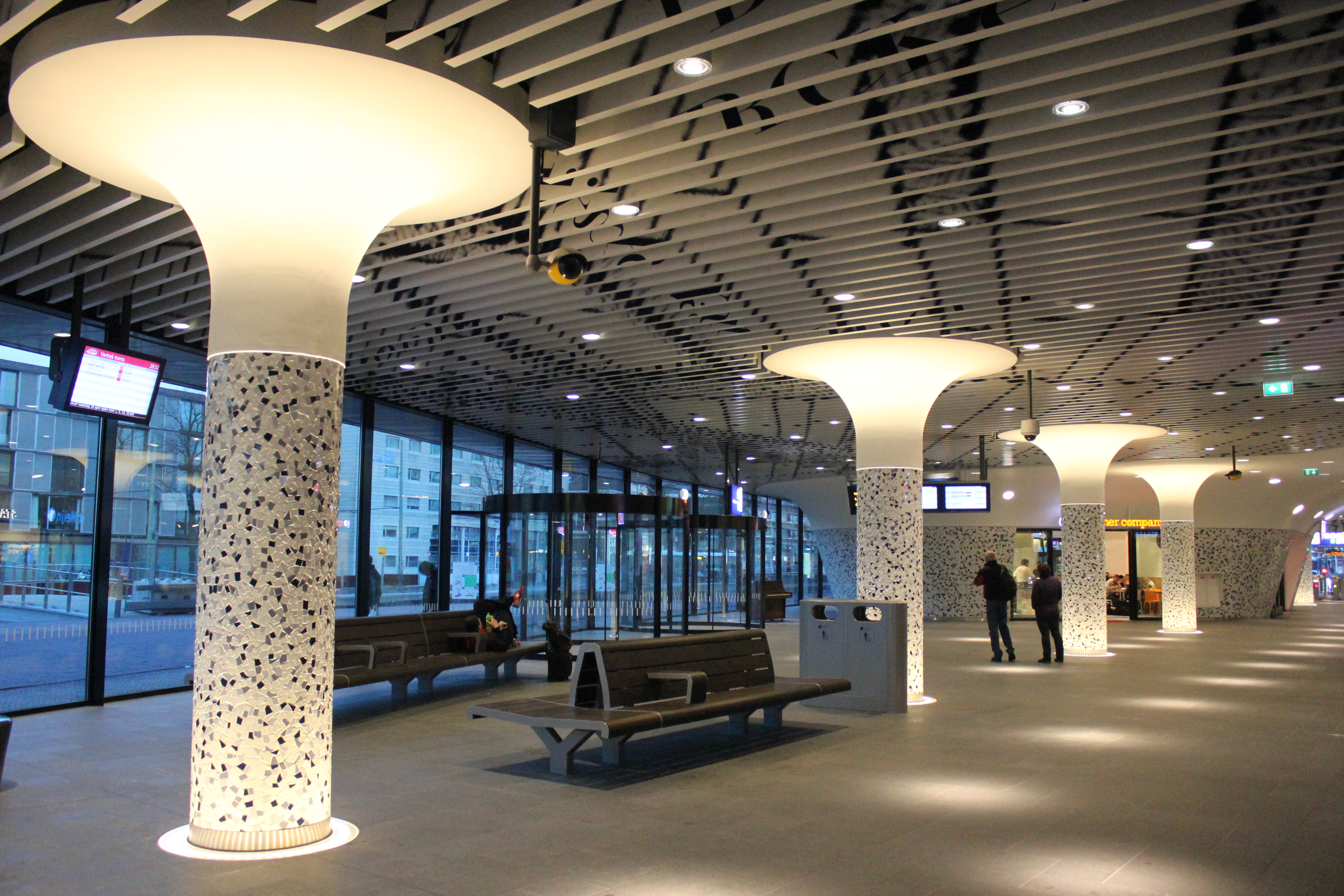
New building interior

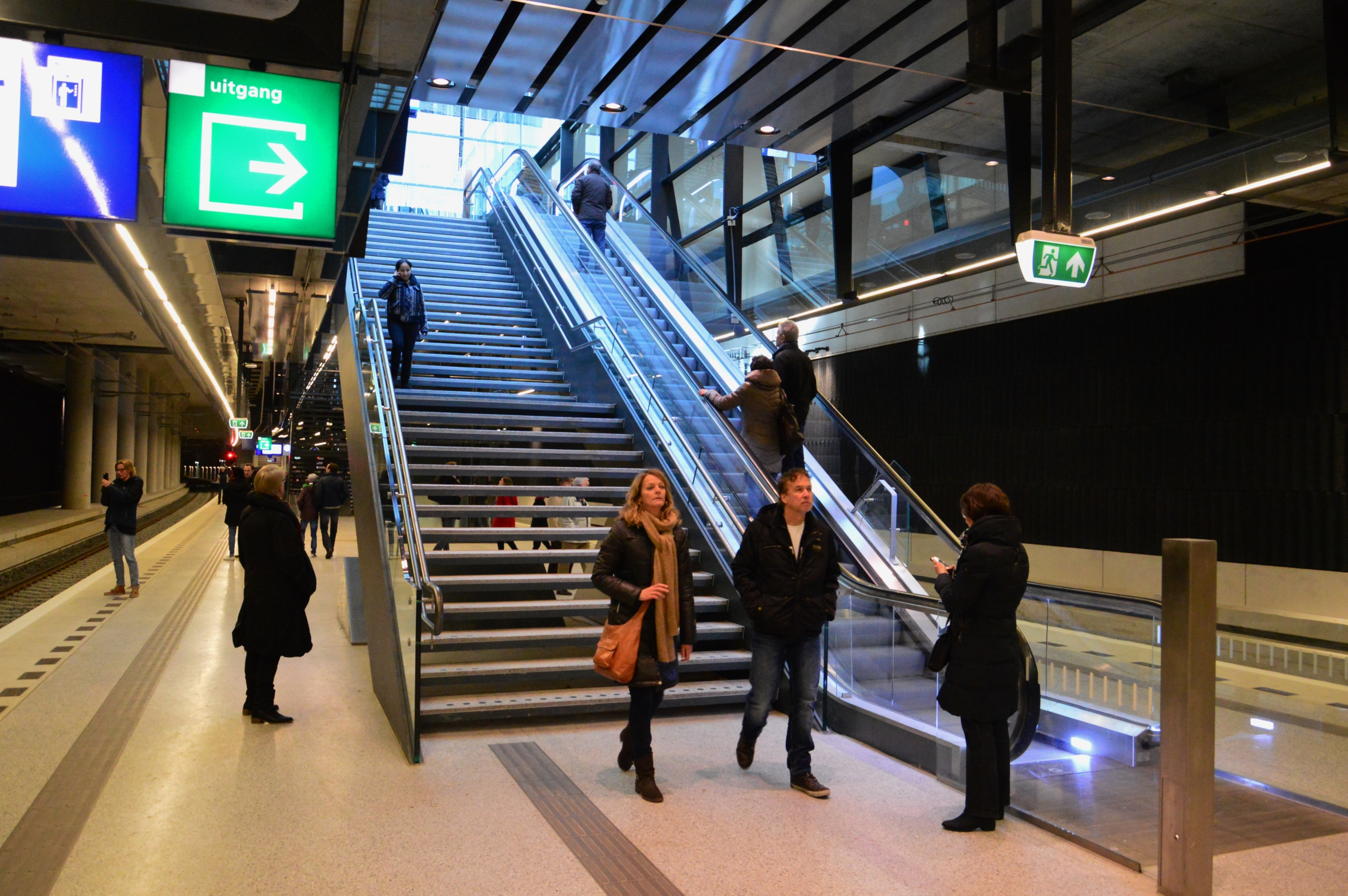
New platform

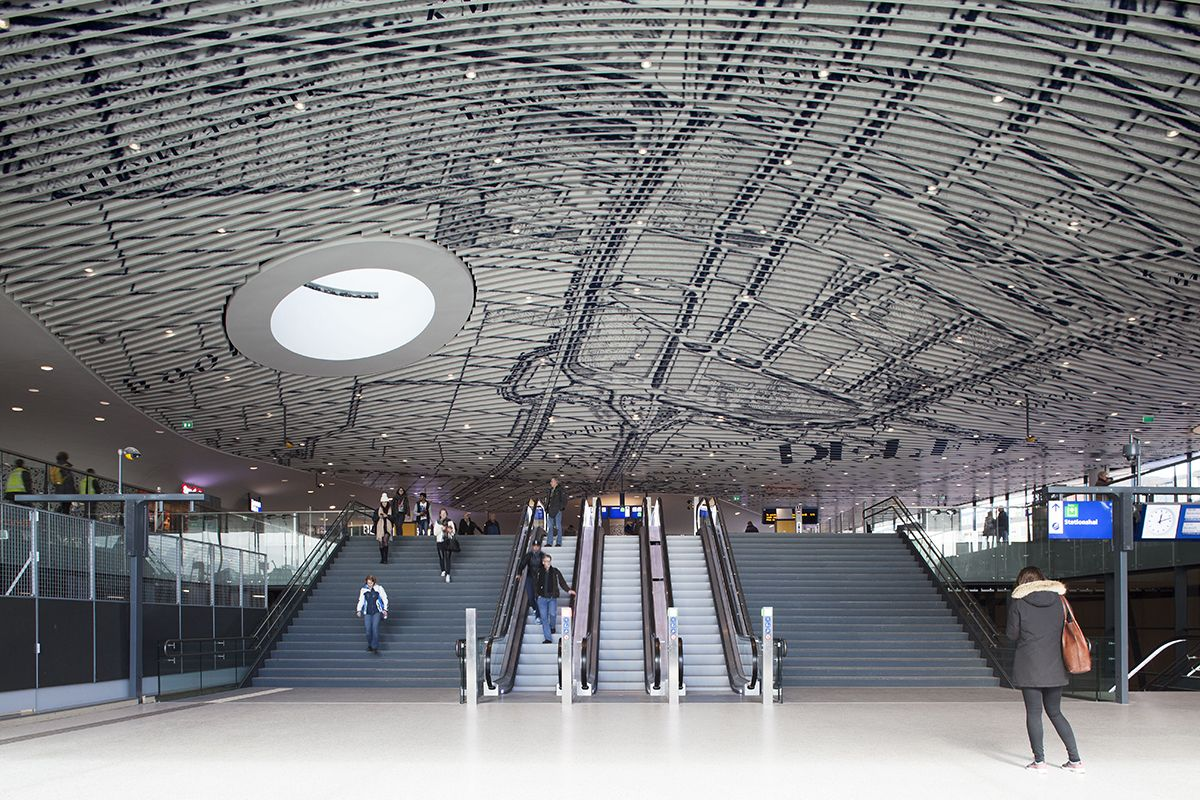
Delft station with map of Delft on the ceiling

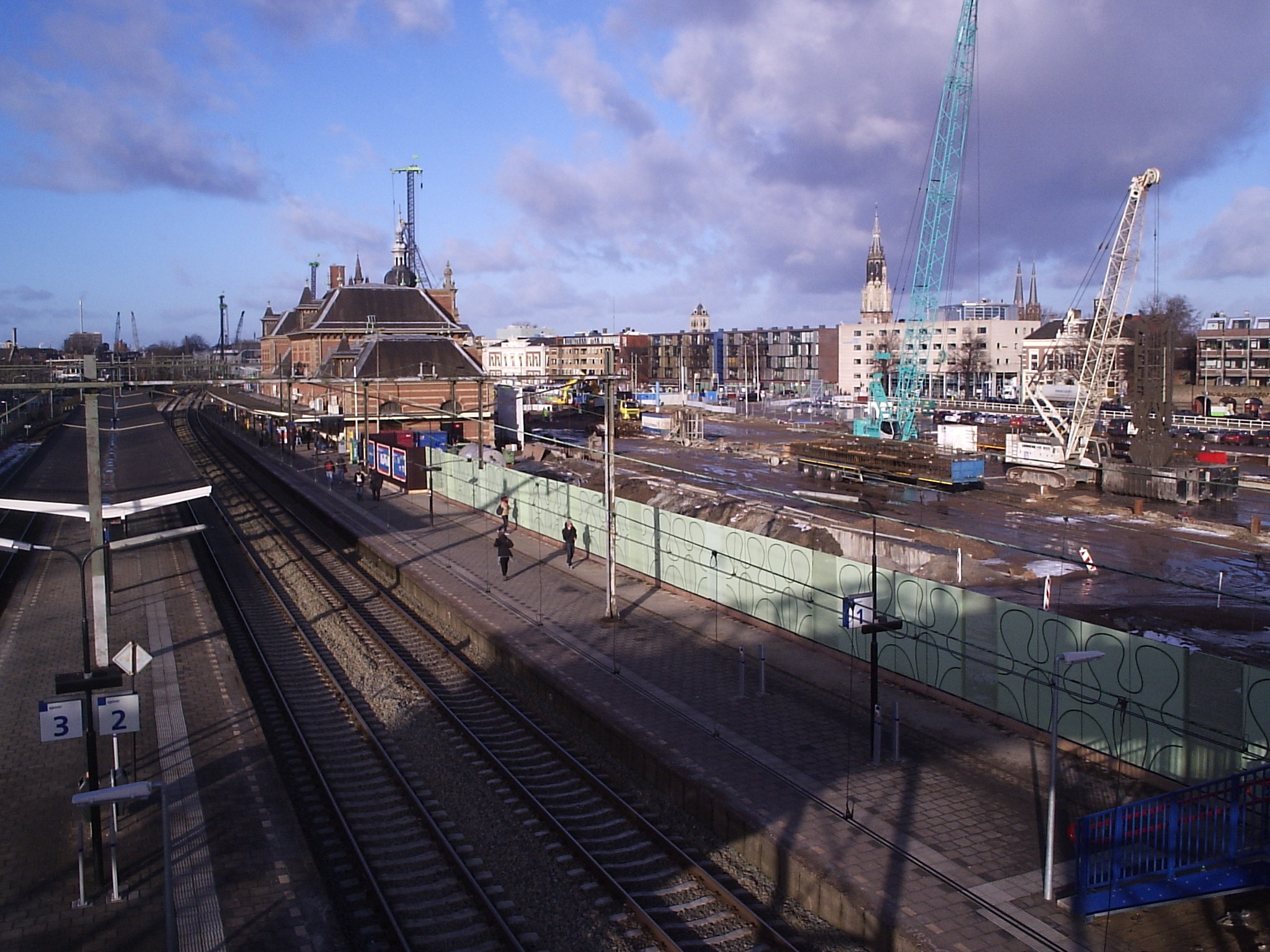
Delft old station during construction of the new tunnels
