= Spoorwijk =

Coordinates: 52°03′N 4°19′E

Location of Spoorwijk in The Hague.

Spoorwijk is a residential neighbourhood in the Laak district of The Hague, Netherlands. Its name, literally rail neighbourhood or track neighbourhood, originated from the fact that the area borders the Amsterdam–Haarlem–Rotterdam railway on the west. The neighbourhood has 4,161 inhabitants and covers an area of 33,3 ha.
