= Abtswoudse Bos =

Coordinates: 51°58′29.1″N 4°21′50.7″E

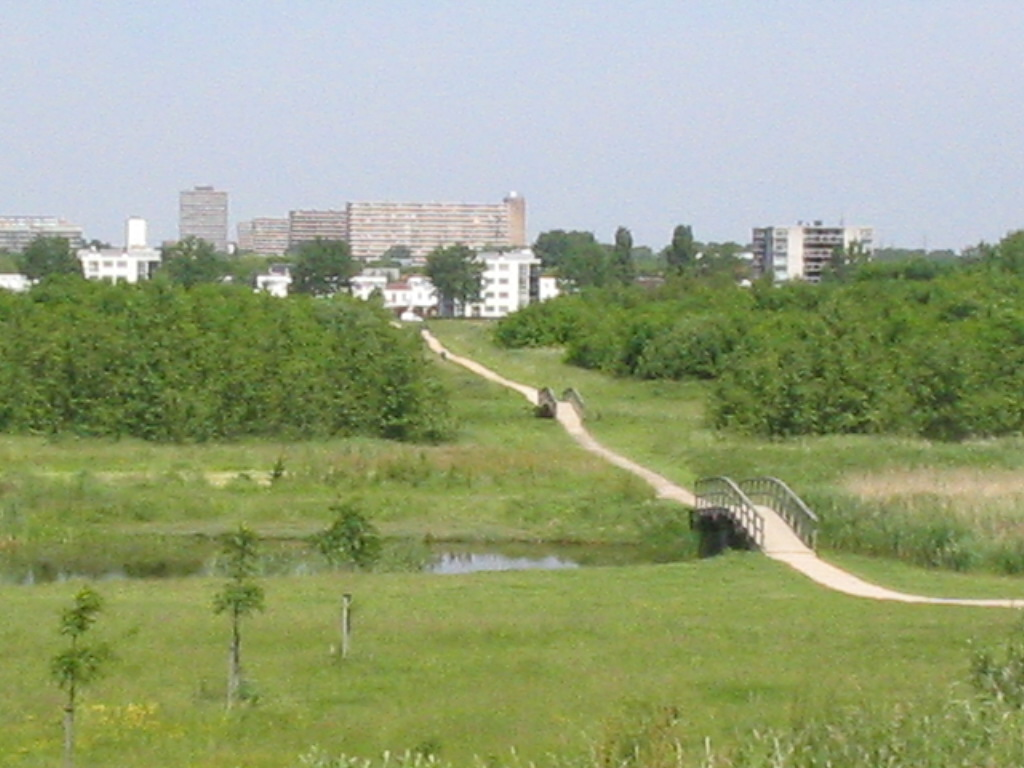
The view towards Tanthof

The Abtswoudse Bos is man-made park and land art project, opened in 2000, of about 190 ha. It lies south of the Tanthof neighbourhood in Delft, east of Schipluiden and north of Overschie.

The Abtswoudse Bos is situated in a polder and has trees, bushes, footpaths, cycling roads, ditches, lakes, and small ponds. The area's waters contain many aquatic plants, like reeds, underwater plants, and floating plants. The polder used to consist of meadows.

== Mother Earth ==
In the centre of the park lies Moeder Aarde (Dutch for Mother Earth). It consists of an artificial hill of about 200 meter wide, 170 meter long and 5 meter high, resembling a human figure. Around this hill is a meadow with planted ashes. In the center of Mother Earth is a circular pond. Bushes with berries have been planted on the arms and legs. The knees, hands, and feet have stayed open. The footpaths on the hill are meant to resemble blood veins.

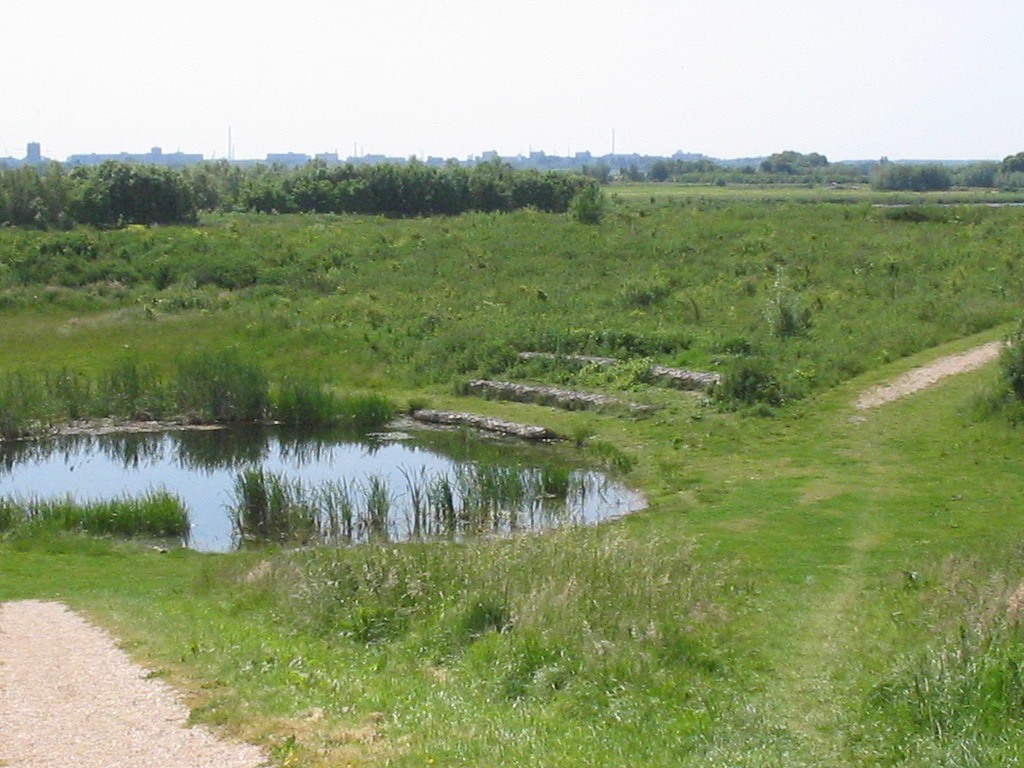
Lake of Mother Earth

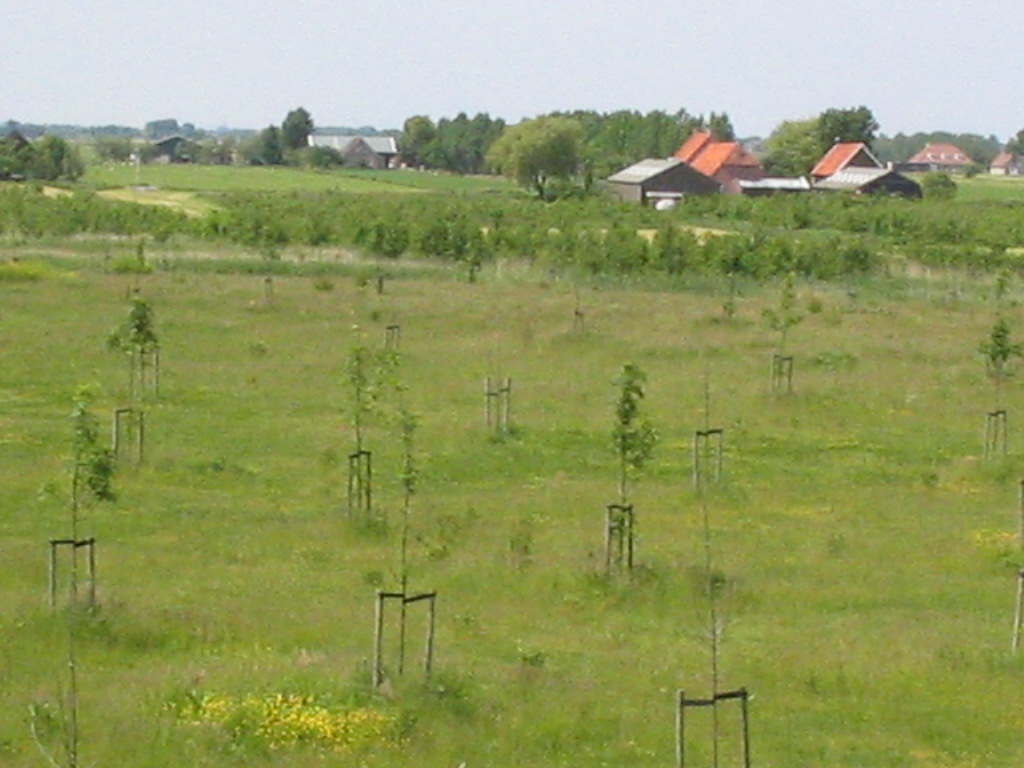
Man-planted ashes

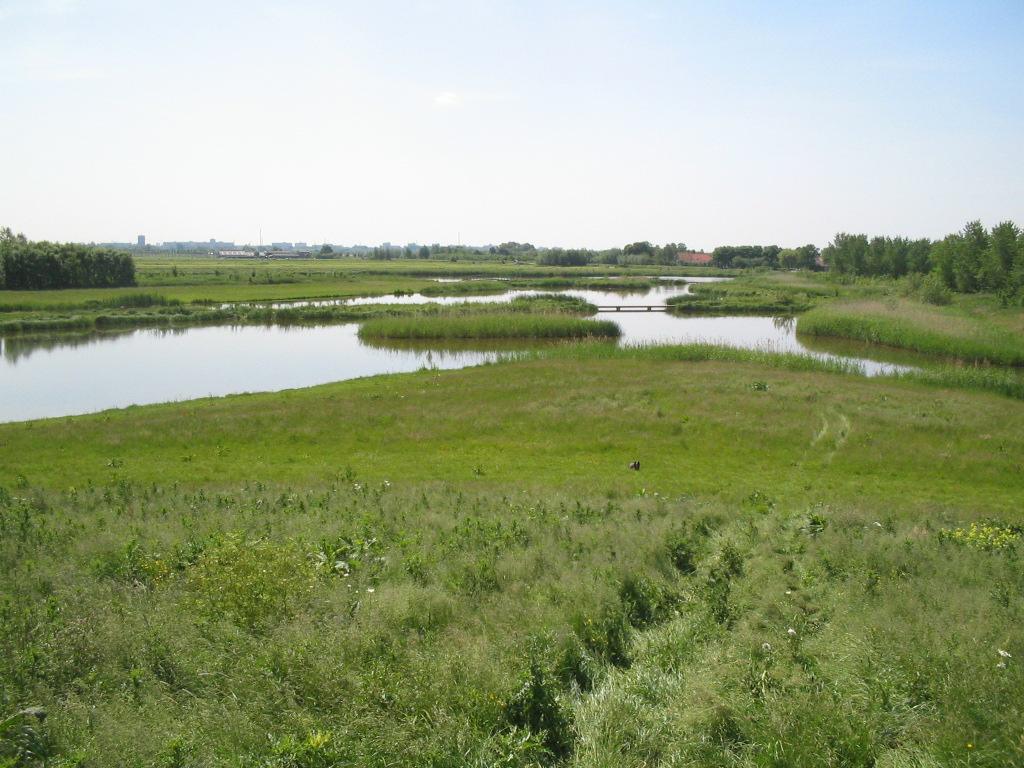
Wetlands

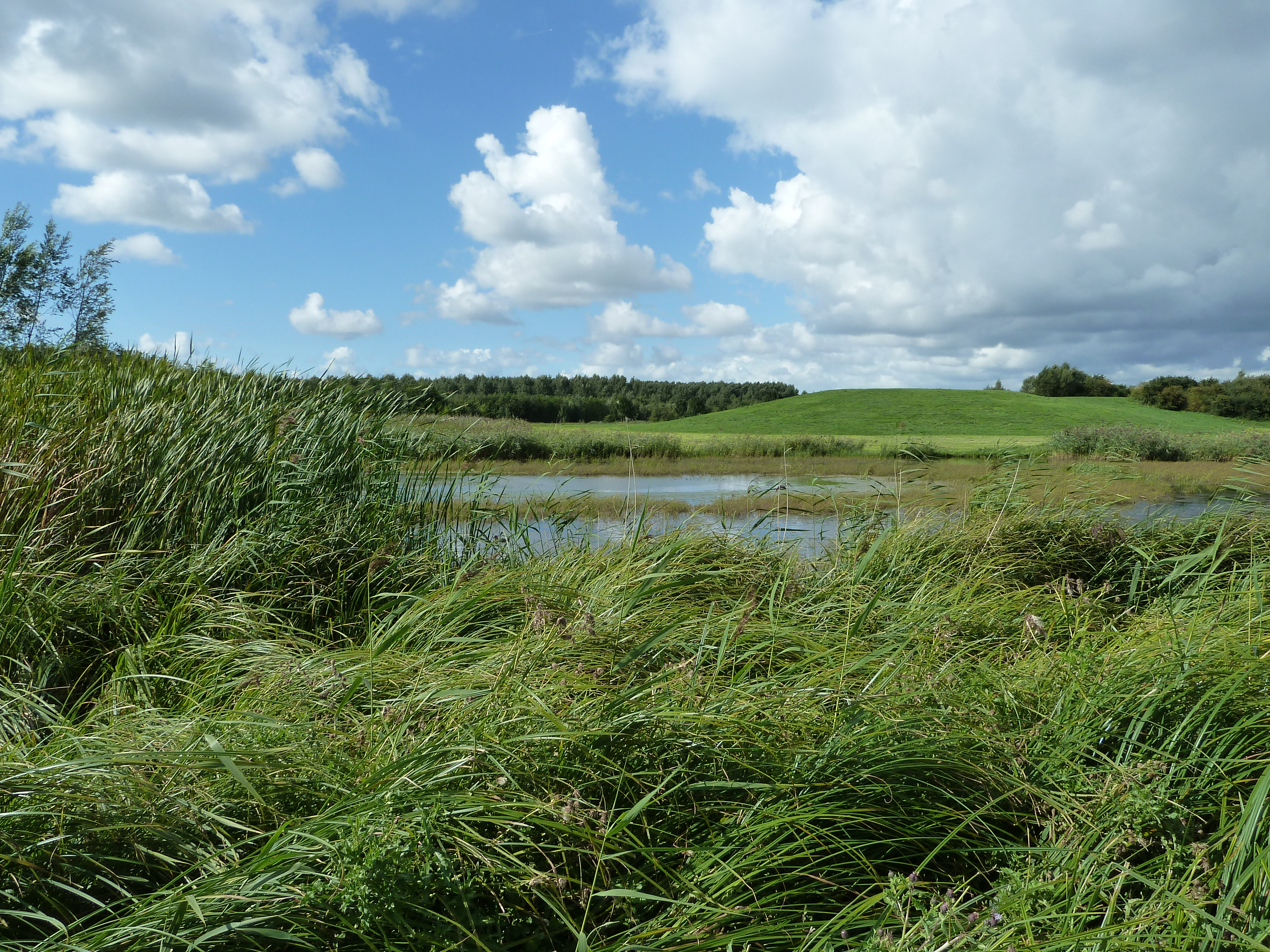
Mother Earth seen from a distance
