= Delft Campus railway station =

Railway station in the Netherlands

Delft Campus
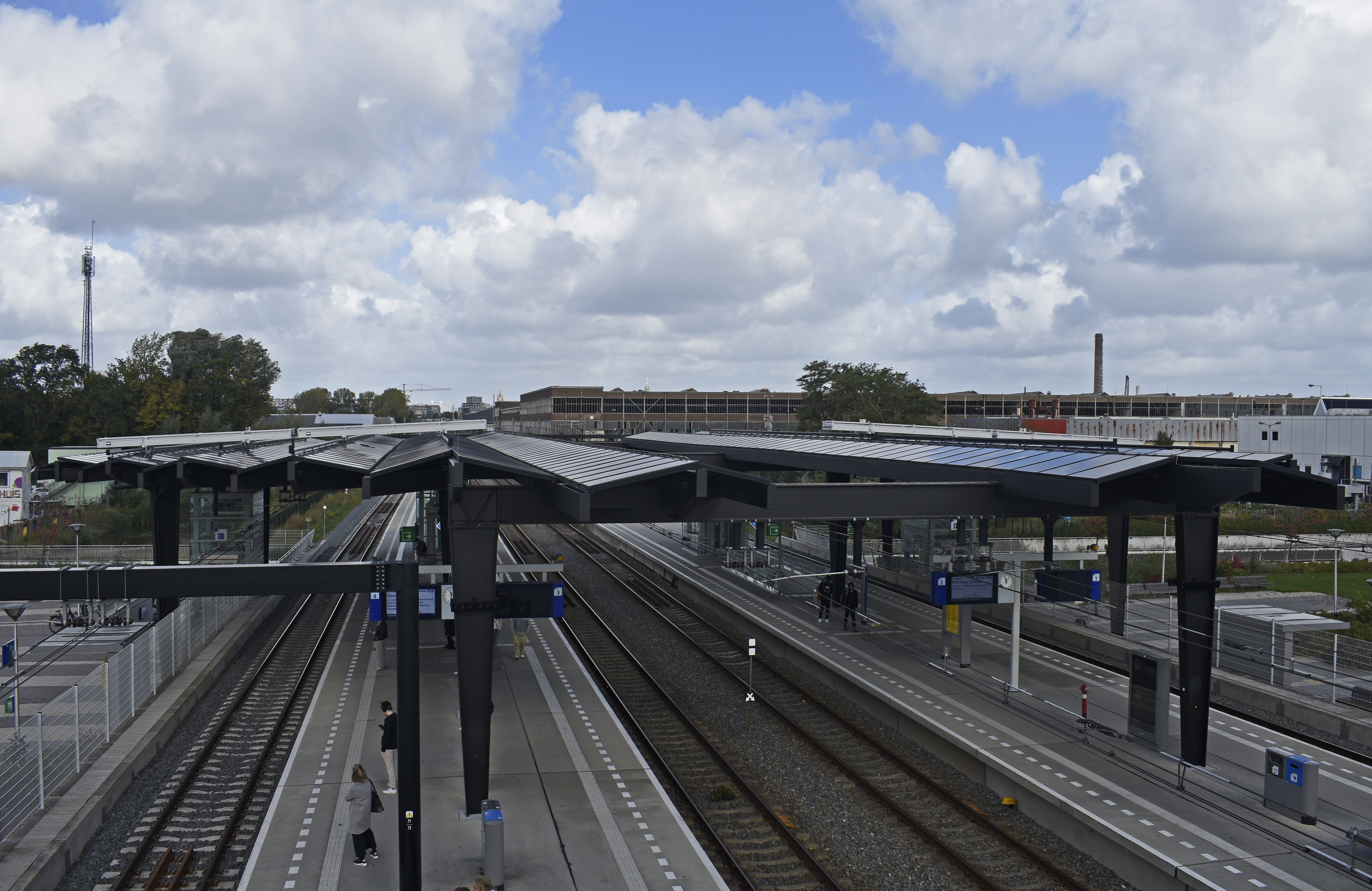
- Station in 2025, after the reconstruction

General information
- Location: Netherlands
- Coordinates: 51°59′26″N 4°21′56″E
- Operator: Nederlandse Spoorwegen
- Line: Amsterdam–Rotterdam railway
- Platforms: 2
- Tracks: 4

Other information
- Station code: Dtz

History
- Opened: 1970

Services
Preceding station	Nederlandse Spoorwegen	Following station
Delft towards Den Haag Centraal	NS Sprinter 5000 Mon-Fri until 20:00	Schiedam Centrum towards Dordrecht
Delft towards Den Haag Centraal	NS Sprinter 5100	Schiedam Centrum towards Dordrecht
Delft towards Den Haag Centraal	NS Sprinter 5200 Mon-Thu until 19:00	Schiedam Centrum towards Dordrecht
Location
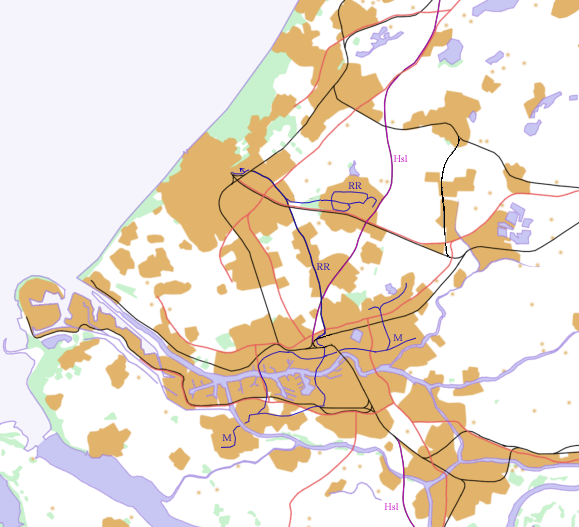
- Location within Southwest Randstad Location within Netherlands

Delft Campus railway station is a railway station in Delft, Netherlands, located on the railway line between The Hague and Rotterdam. The railway station was opened on 31 May 1970. The station building was demolished in June 2006. The name of the station was Delft Zuid until 14 December 2019. The current name of the station derives from the nearby campus of Delft University of Technology.

The station area is dominated by the overpassing viaduct, which carries the Kruithuisweg, a provincial highway, over the railroad.

In the end of the 2010s the station was rebuilt according to the project developed by Benthem Crouwel Architects. In particular, the platforms were put under a black deck which was modeled like a bat wing and covered by solar panels. In 2021, Delft Campus became the first energy neutral railway station in the Netherlands. In 2025 the project received the Brunel Awards for railway architecture.

== Train services ==
The following services call at Delft Campus:

- 4x per hour local service (sprinter) The Hague CS - Rotterdam - Dordrecht (Mon-Fri 5 a.m. - 20 p.m.)
- 2x per hour local service (sprinter) The Hague CS - Rotterdam - Dordrecht (Mon-Fri after 20 p.m., all weekend)

== Gallery ==
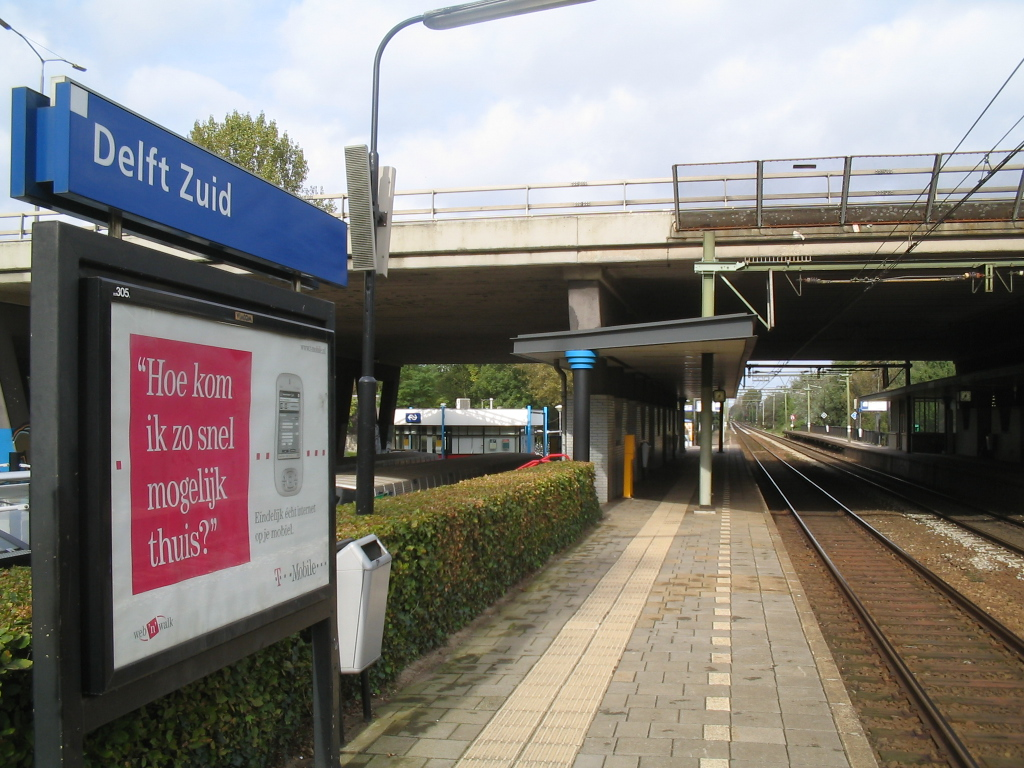

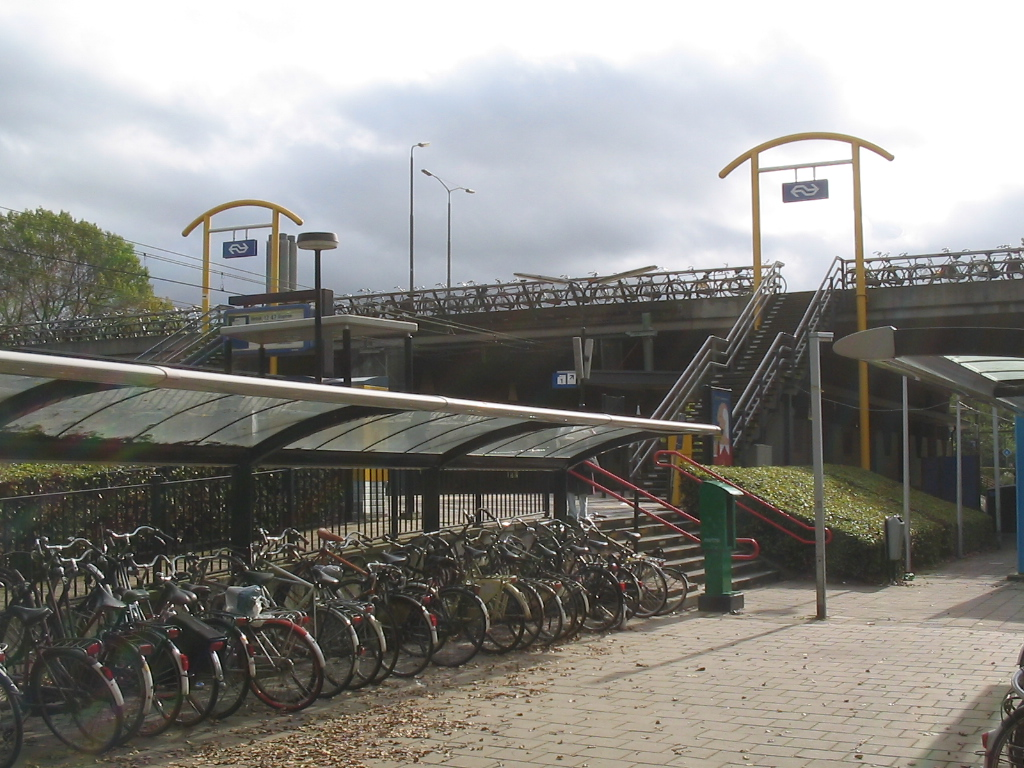

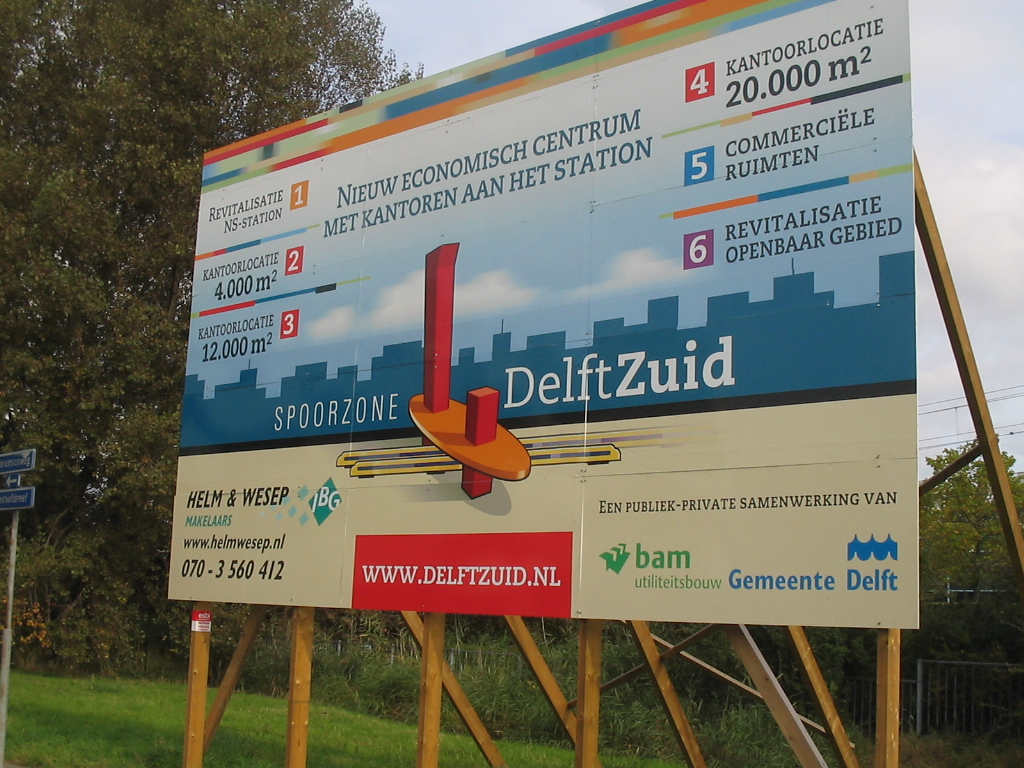

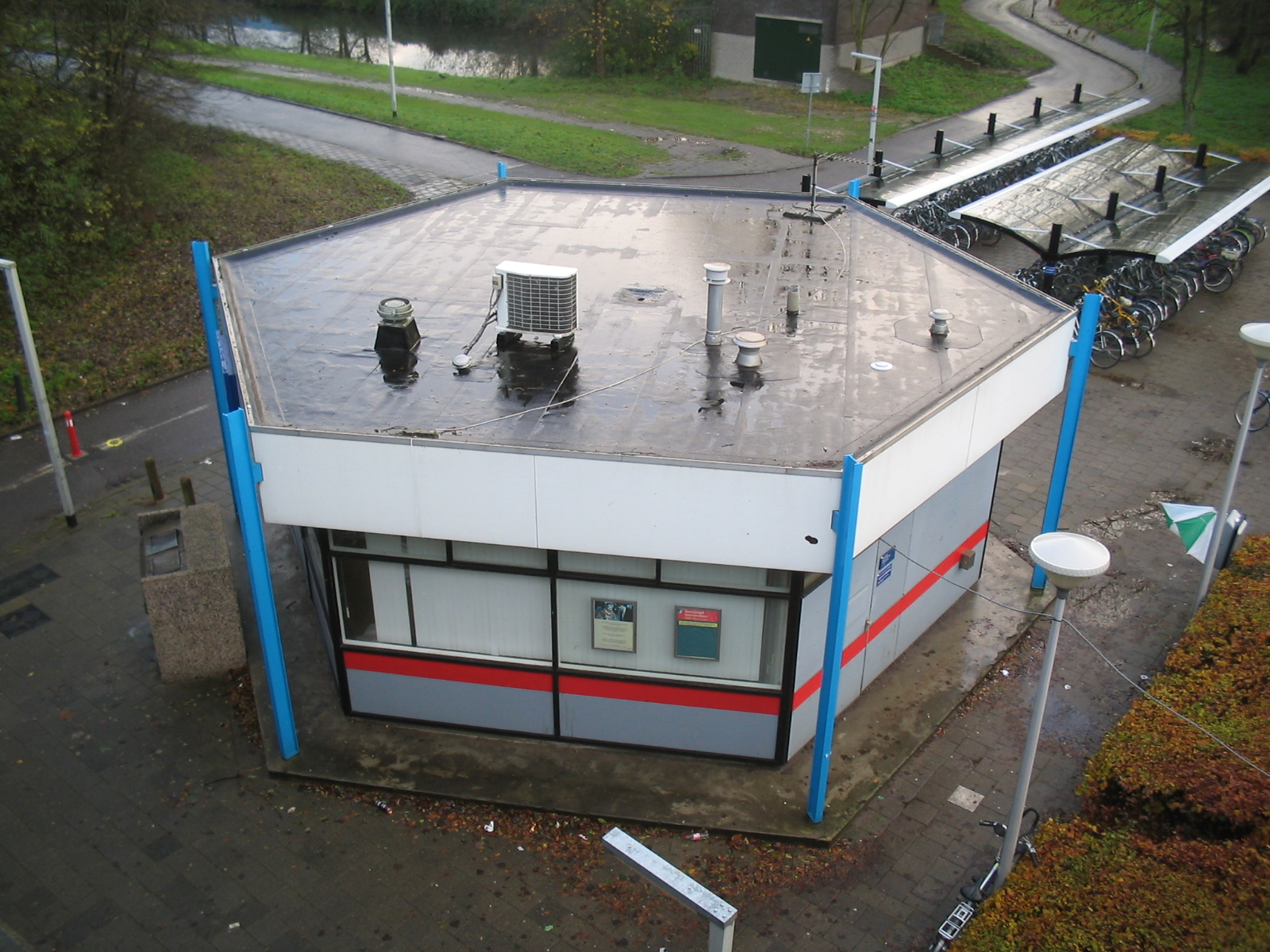
