= Amsterdam–Haarlem–Rotterdam railway =

Railway line in the Netherlands

Amsterdam–Haarlem–Rotterdam railway Oude Lijn
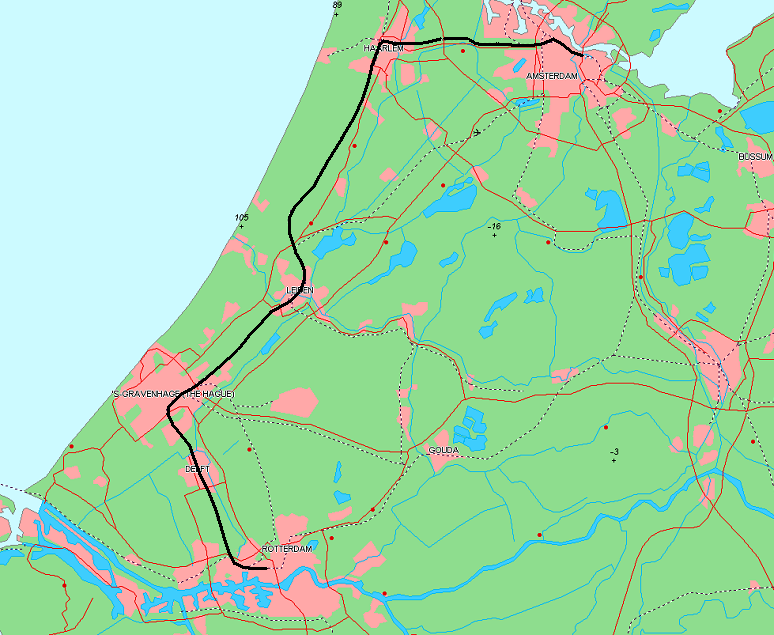

Overview
- Status: Operational
- Locale: Netherlands
- Termini: Amsterdam Centraal railway station; Rotterdam Centraal railway station

Service
- Operator(s): Nederlandse Spoorwegen

History
- Opened: 1839–1847; 179 years ago

Technical
- Line length: 86 km (53 mi)
- Number of tracks: Double track
- Track gauge: 1,435 mm (4 ft 8 1/2 in) standard gauge
- Electrification: 1.5 kV DC

The railway from Amsterdam through Haarlem to Rotterdam (also: Oude Lijn, Dutch for "old line") runs from Amsterdam Centraal to Rotterdam Centraal through Haarlem and The Hague.

From December 2011 it is used by all direct trains from Amsterdam to The Hague, and all direct supplement-free trains from Amsterdam to Rotterdam except those through Woerden.

== History ==
It contains the oldest railway line in the Netherlands, and follows the old horse-drawn boat (Dutch: trekschuit) canal route from Leiden via Haarlem to Amsterdam-Sloterdijk. It was opened between 1839 and 1847 by the Hollandsche IJzeren Spoorweg-Maatschappij. The oldest section, opened in 1839, ran from Amsterdam to Haarlem. Leiden and The Hague were reached in 1843, and the final section from The Hague to Rotterdam was opened in June 1847.

The opening of the Weesp–Leiden railway (1978) and the Amsterdam–Schiphol railway (1986) provided a shorter connection from Leiden through Schiphol Airport to Amsterdam. Nevertheless, the old line via Haarlem has remained an important railway line.

In March 2015 a new tunnel and station were opened in Delft, underpassing the former railway station and viaduct. On 2 August 2024 the doubling of the tracks was completed after a long delay.
