= ZJA =

Dutch architect firm

ZJA Architects & Engineers
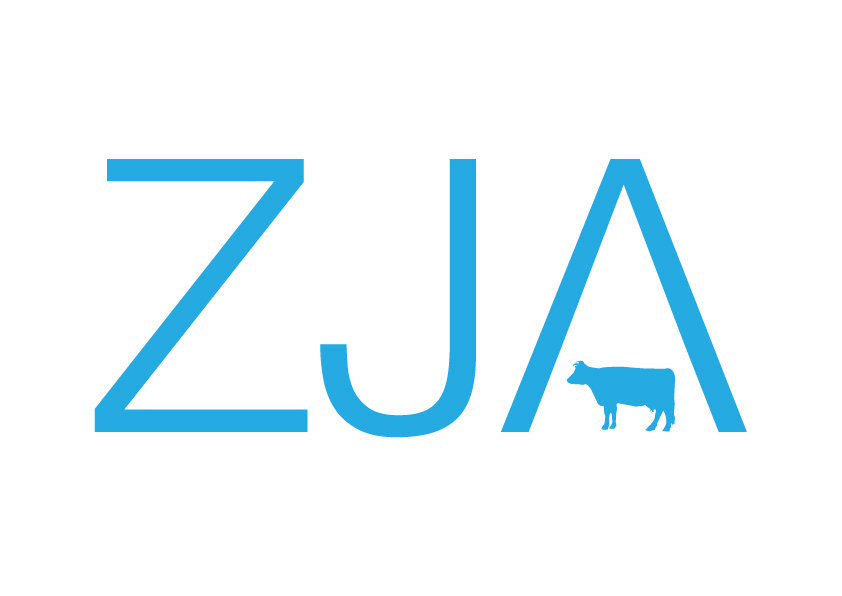

Practice information
- Partners: Rob Torsing, Reinald Top, Ralph Kieft, Erik Smits, Kay Oosterman
- Founders: Moshé Zwarts & Rein Jansma
- Founded: 1990
- No. of employees: approx. 50
- Location: Amsterdam

Significant works and honors
- Projects: Albert Cuyp parking garage, Netkous, De Kuip, Thialf, AFAS Stadium, Wintrack High Voltage Pylons

Website
- www.zja.nl/en/

ZJA Architects & Engineers (previously known as Zwarts & Jansma Architecten) is a Dutch architectural studio located in Amsterdam and founded in 1990 by Rein Jansma (1959-2023) and Moshé Zwarts (1937-2019). To date, the studio has approximately 50 staff and the partners are Rob Torsing, Reinald Top, Ralph Kieft, Erik Smits and Kay Oosterman.

== History ==
The architectural studio Zwarts & Jansma Architecten was founded in 1990 as partnership between the late Rein Jansma and the late Moshé Zwarts, former professor of architectural technology. In 1971 Zwarts met Jansma, the son of his friend and neighbor Arie Jansma, an activist, inventor and artist. During the 80s, several years before registering their ‘office for architecture and development’ (buro voor architectuur en ontwikkeling), architecture student Jansma and professor Zwarts (professor of building technology at TU Eindhoven and TU Delft) collaborated and developed projects and experiments in the workshop next to Zwarts' home in Abcoude. As their collaboration became more serious, they formalised their partnership in 1990 with the architectural studio known today as ZJA Architects & Engineers. One of their first design assignments was for a bus or tramway shelter for the city of The Hague. Their design was awarded the Berlage Award and the city of The Hague ordered 800 shelters.

ZJA Architects & Engineers subsequently took on a wide variety of projects. They were commissioned to design the Dutch Pavilion at the World Expo 1992 in Seville. ZJA Architects & Engineers also designed the upper ring and the roof of Feijenoord Football Stadium, De Kuip in Rotterdam (1993) and the new glasshouse for the Hortus Botanicus in Amsterdam (1992).

In the following years ZJA Architects & Engineers specialised in infrastructure projects, such as (bicycle) bridges, metro and train stations and traffic interchanges. However, sports halls, (football) stadiums, entertainment centres and wildlife crossings also feature prominently in their portfolio.

== Design approach ==
ZJA Architects & Engineers is known for attention to areas where architectural design touches upon questions of engineering, construction technology and materials. The architectural studio has its own research and development department, which produces results that in some cases lead to patents. An example of the latter, is the new building typology known as The Shaded Dome, an extremely flexible and mobile construction that combines an air-inflated dome with a tent that rests on a network of steel cables.

ZJA designs are characteristically simple, light and slender structures. The designs follow flowing lines, the colours are mostly light, the shapes resemble a stylised version of organic forms, in correspondence with the program and the direct environment. According to ZJA itself, they are always looking to minimise the use of energy and material while trying to hinder as little as possible the open views and the free movement of people.

== Selected projects and awards ==
Year	Project	City	Award
1990	Bus and tram shelters	The Hague	Dutch Steel Award (1990), Berlageprijs (1989)
1992	Dutch Pavilion World Expo	Sevilla	
1993	Hortus Botanicus	Amsterdam	
2001	Inflatable Rubber Dam	Harderwijk	
2003	Galgenwaard Stadium FC Utrecht	Utrecht	
2005	Pedestrian Tunnel Wilhelminaplein	Rotterdam	Dutch Steel Award (2006), Job Dura award (2006), Dutch Design Award (2005)
2006	Lightrailstation De Netkous Beatrixlaan	The Hague	Routepluim (2008)
2010	Amfora Amstel	Amsterdam	MIPIM Future Projects Award (Big Urban Projects) (2010)
2015	Extended Waal bridge	Nijmegen	Dutch Concrete Award (2015)
2015	Wintrack High Voltage Pylons		Dutch Steel Award (2016)
2015	Parking Garage Kustwerk Katwijk	Katwijk	German Design Award (2017), IPME Award of Excellence (2017), BNA Dutch Best Building of the Year Award (2016), Prix d'Excellence 2016 Nederland, WAN Infrastructure Award (2016), Falco Award (2015), Rijnlandse Architectuur Prijs (2015) Nominations: Gouden Piramide (2015), Agemaprijs (2015), Mies van der Rohe Award (2017), Schreuderprijs (2017)
2016	Lightrail station E-line	The Hague	German Design Award (2019), European Steel Design Award (2019), WAN Transport Award (2017)
2017	Thialf ice arena	Heerenveen	German Design Award (2018)
2018	Albert Cuyp parking garage	Amsterdam	Dutch Concrete Award (2019), Architizer A+Awards (2019) Architecture – Urban Transformation, Award of Excellence for Architectural Achievement (2019), ESPA Gold Award (2018)
2019	AFAS Stadion	Alkmaar	
2020	Freedom Museum	Groesbeek	
2020	Diamond Exchange, Capital C Amsterdam	Amsterdam	Dutch Steel Award (2020), MIPIM Award 2020, Architecture Masterprize (2020), WAN Award (2020), German Design Award (2021)
2024	Venue Building Silt, Middelkerke	Middelkerke	International Architecture Award (2022), BLT Award (2024), Architecture Masterprize (2024)

== Publications ==
- Zwarts & Jansma Architects. By J. Mensink. Amsterdam: Architecture & Natura, 2003. ISBN 9-05-662303-6
- 100 jaar Modern Den Haag. By E. Vreedenburg & Marcel Teunissen, with contributions by Mick Eekhout. Rotterdam: NAi Publishers, 2020. ISBN 978-94-6208-579-4
- Het Stadion de architectuur van massasport. By M. Bouw (and includes interview with ZJA). Rotterdam: NAI Publishers, 2000. ISBN 9789056621445
- Architecture Now. Amsterdam: Architectura & Natura, 1991. ISBN 9-07-157011-8

== Gallery ==
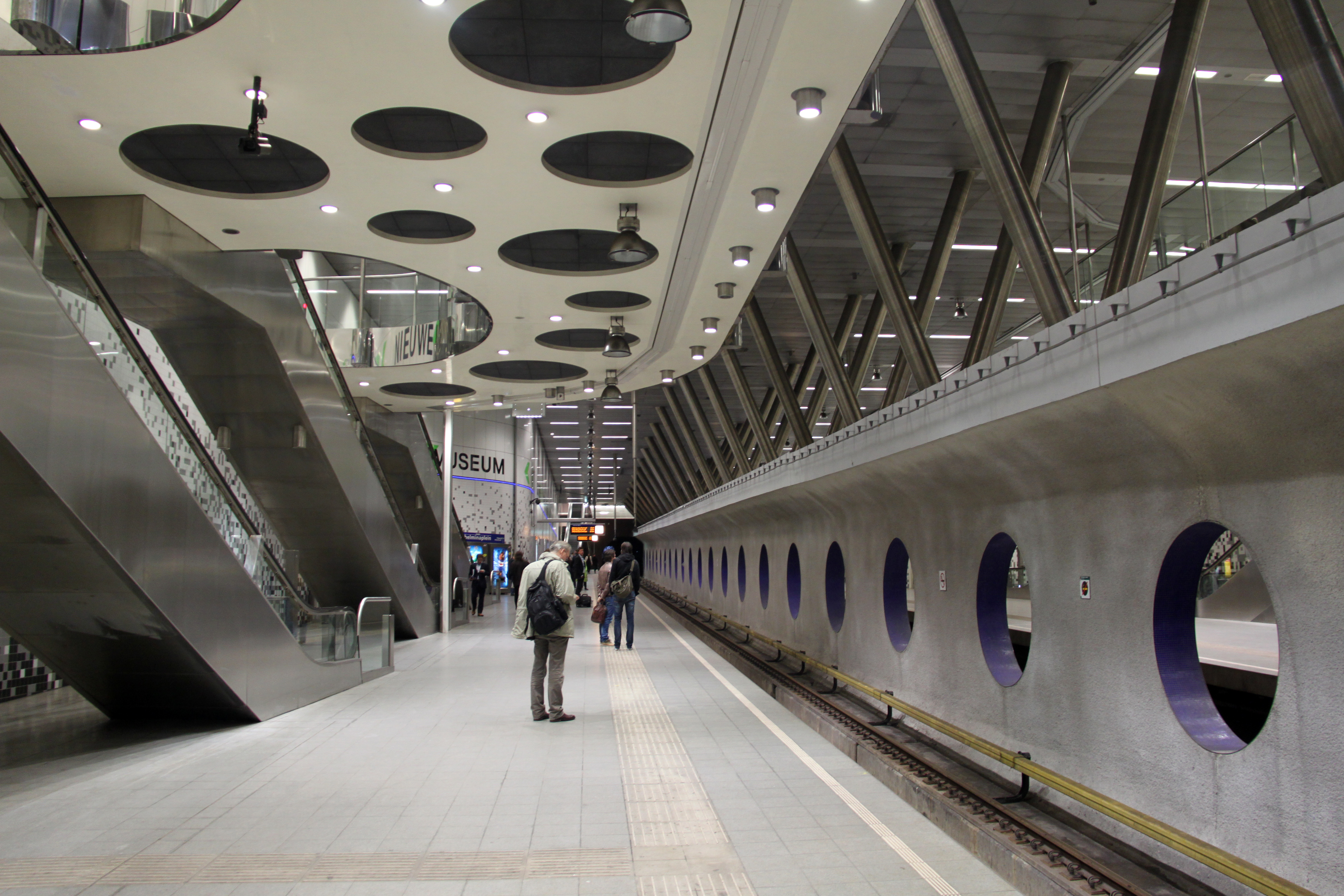
Metrostation Wilhelminaplein

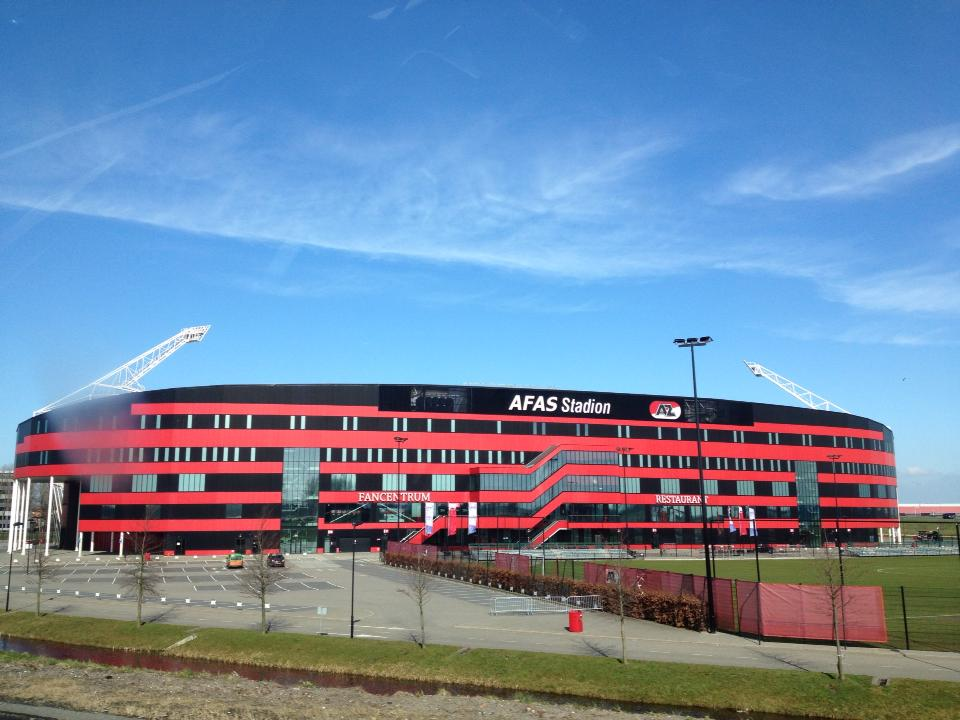
AFAS stadion

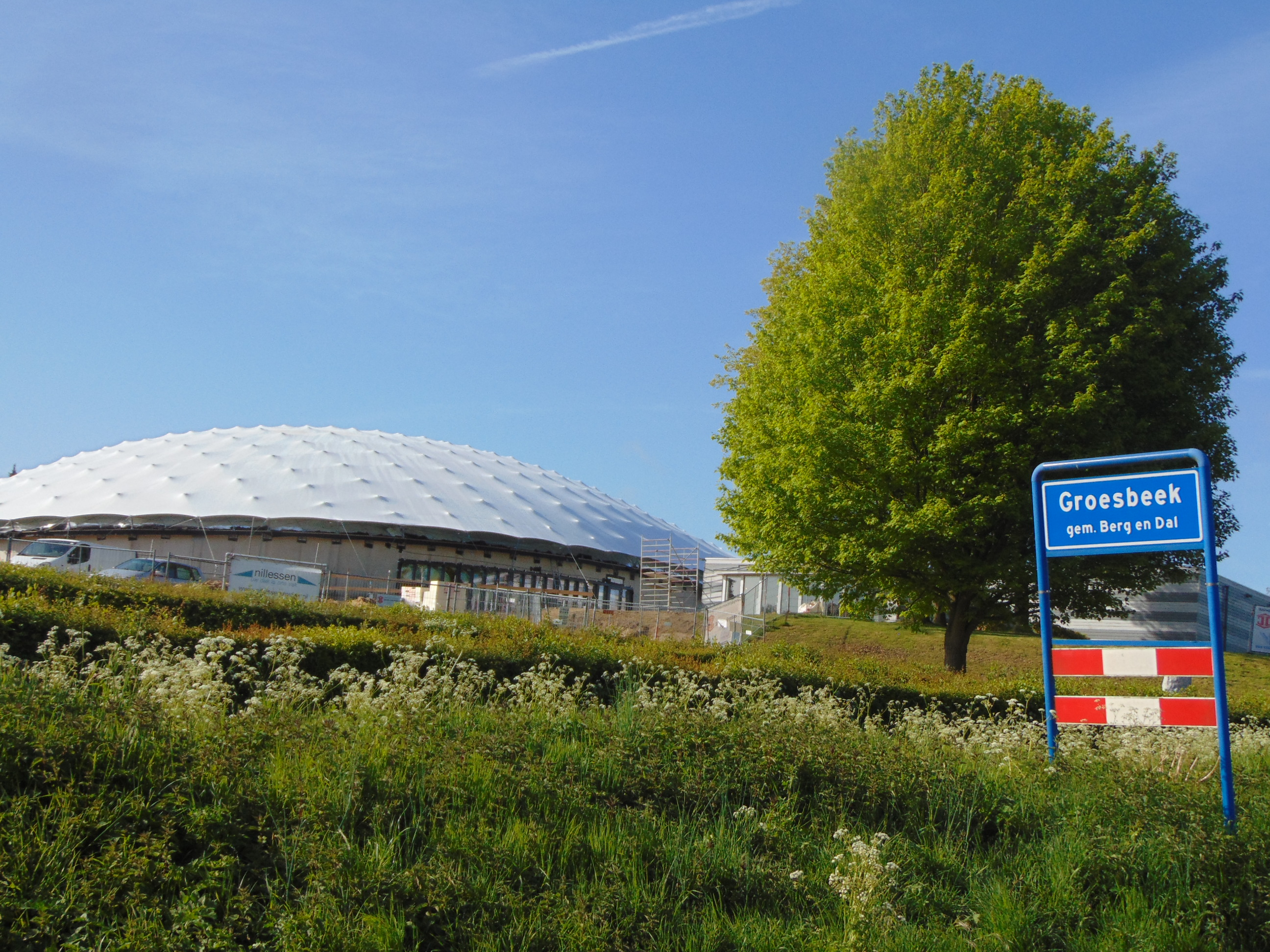
Freedom Museum Groesbeek

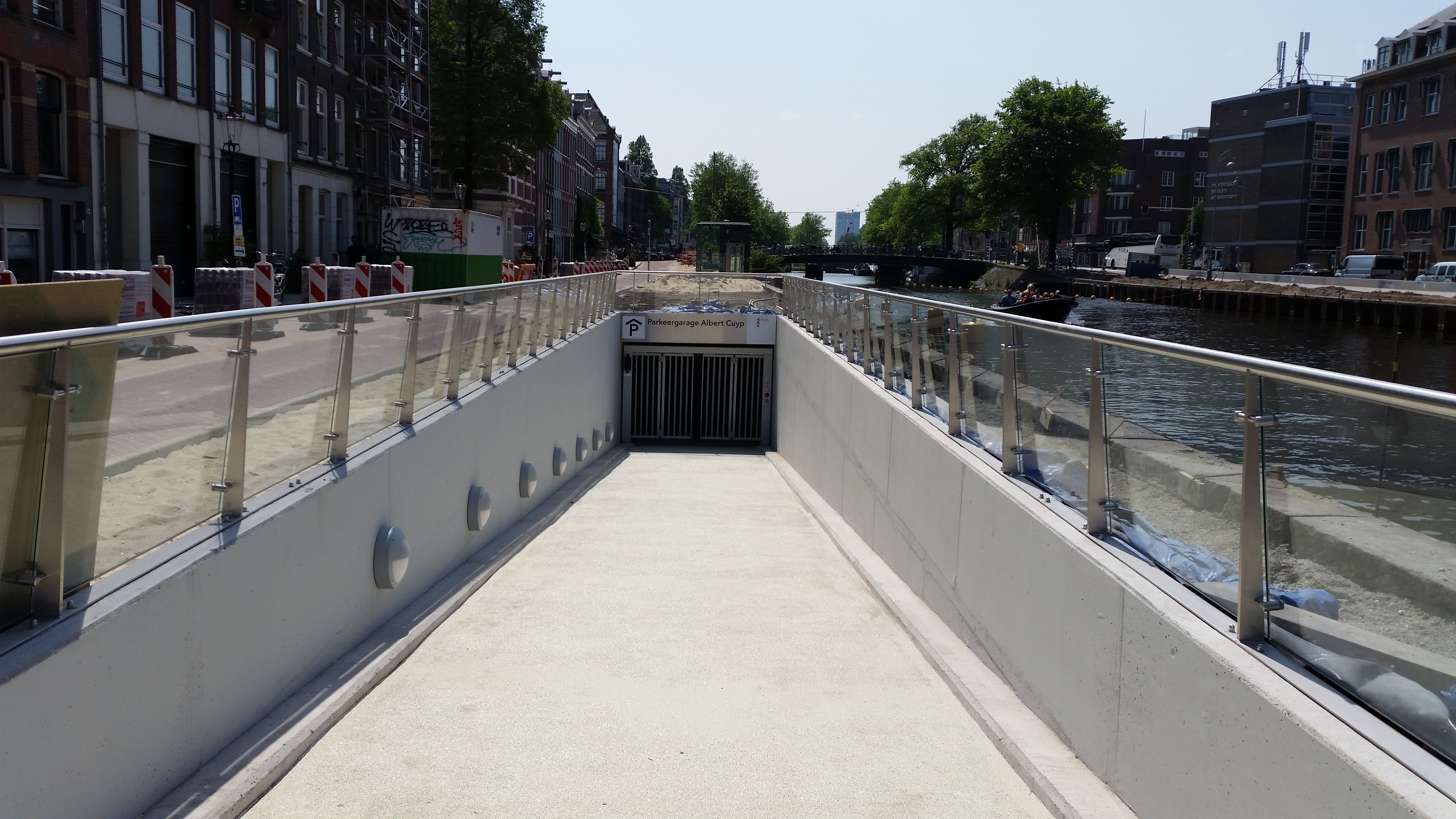
Albert Cuypgarage (entrance)

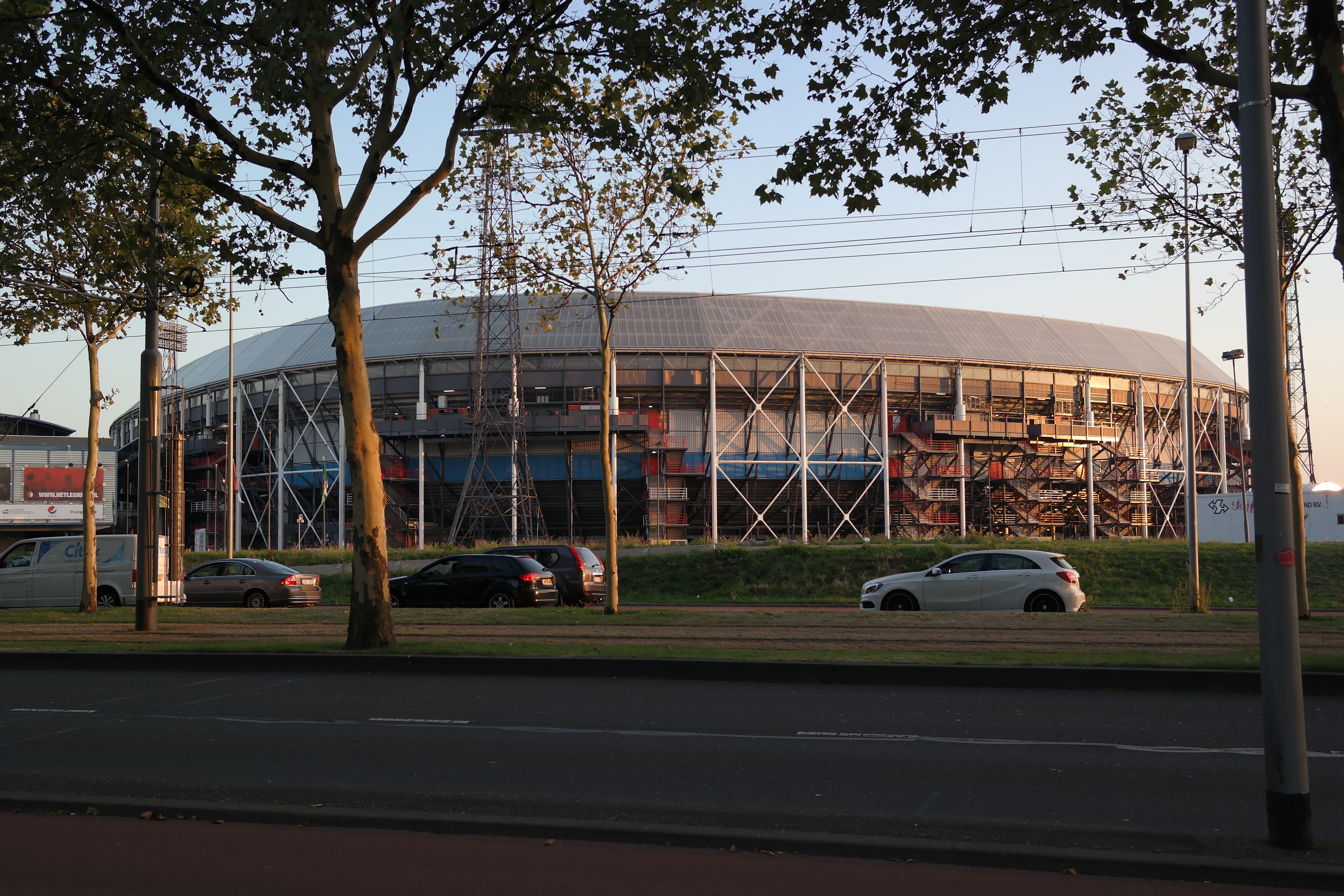
De Kuip Feijenoord stadion

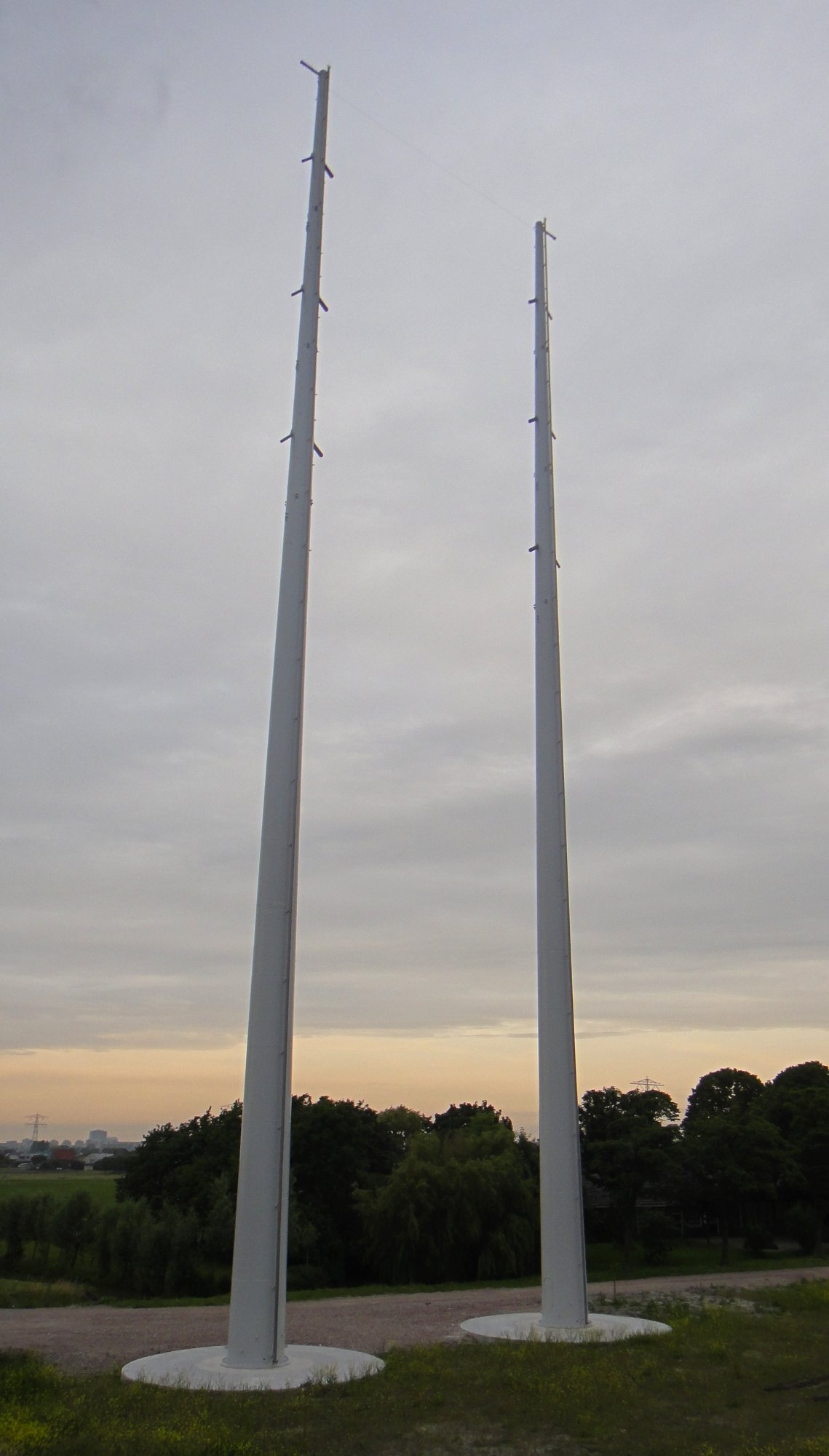
Wintrack high voltage pylons under construction
