= Moshé Zwarts =

Dutch architect (1937–2019)

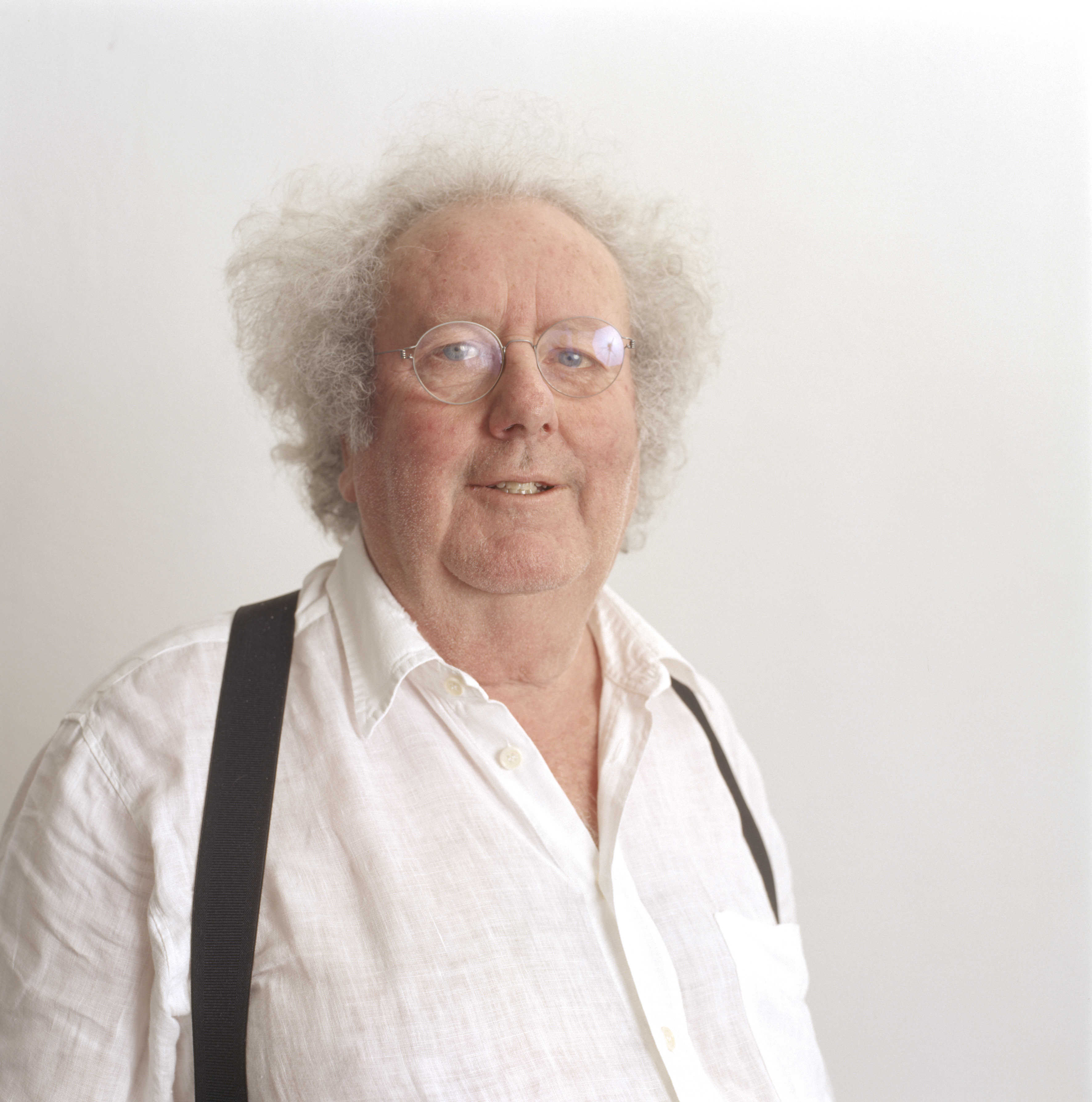
Moshé Zwarts

Moshé Zwarts (27 August 1937, Haifa, Israël – 4 December 2019, Amsterdam, Netherlands) was a Dutch architect, founder of the architectural office ZJA (formerly Zwarts & Jansma Architecten) and a former senior professor of Architectural Technology at the Technical University of Delft and the Technical University of Eindhoven. His portfolio encompasses many infrastructural projects including football stadiums.

== Early life and education ==
Zwarts was born in 1937, in the household of Jewish-Dutch parents in Haifa, present day Israel. In 1939 the family moved to Amsterdam. The year was the start of the World War II when his family was deported initially to the Dutch camp Westerbork and then to Bergen-Belsen. After liberation by the Red Army, they were able to return to Amsterdam. The reception of camp survivors was in the catacombs of the Central Station of Amsterdam. Although Zwarts was eight years old at the time, it made a stark impression on him as he would commemorate at the end of his life. At Zwarts’ request, the Dutch Railways have placed a remembrance plaque inside the station acknowledging the failure of the Dutch government to properly receive survivors of German concentration camps.

After finishing the HBS secondary school, he went to study architecture at the Technical University of Delft, where he was inspired by Dutch architects Cornelis van Eesteren and Jo van den Broek. Van den Broek supervised Zwarts’ graduation in 1963, which encompassed a computer-generated design for a new Schiphol Airport. Being the first at the faculty to use computers for solving architectural problems, Zwarts’ was awarded a cum laude distinction.

== Academic career ==
After university, Zwarts was employed by Shell Plastics Laboratory, where he worked from 1963 until 1969. During his research on plastics in construction, he developed an innovative lightweight building system for better, more affordable social housing that could be built in less time.

In 1969 Zwarts was offered a teaching position at the Technical University of Eindhoven as a Lecturer of Architectural Detailing. Shortly afterwards he became Head of the Department of Building Production Technology. From 1981 until 1989 he was Senior Professor in Architectural Technology at both TU Eindhoven and TU Delft.

== ZJA ==
In January 1990, Zwarts (aged 52) founded an architectural office in partnership with Rein Jansma (aged 31). Jansma is the son of Zwarts’ close friend, the late artist Arie Jansma. Despite their age gap of more than 20 years, Zwarts and Jansma proved to be a successful creative team with their architectural office ZJA (formerly Zwarts & Jansma Architecten) still functioning today.

Notable projects of ZJA include the Dutch pavilion for the Seville Expo '92, the metro station Wilhelminaplein in Rotterdam, the internationally-acclaimed light rail station ‘De Netkous’ at the Beatrixlaan in The Hague and the renovation of the Feijenoord Football Stadium ‘De Kuip’.

Over the years, ZJA grew as a company to employ around fifty employees. Reinald Top and Rob Torsing joined the board in 2003 and Ralph Kieft in 2019. Aged 72, Zwarts retired in 2009. Privately he continued his own research and design practice.

== Personal life ==
Moshé Zwarts was married to Mineke Zwarts-Broekman and they had two children.

== Publications ==
Publications with contributions by Moshé Zwarts:

- Zwarts & Jansma Architects. By Jeroen Mensink. Amsterdam: Architecture & Natura, 2003. ISBN 9-05-662303-6
- Architecten 15 portretten. Amsterdam: Architectura & Natura, 2005. ISBN 9-07-686329-6
- Architectuur als discipline. By Bart Goldhoorn. Rotterdam: NAI uitgevers, 1996. ISBN 9-05-662031-2
- Architecture Now. Amsterdam: Architectura & Natura, 1991. ISBN 9-07-157011-8
