= Maartje Nevejan =

Dutch documentary filmmaker

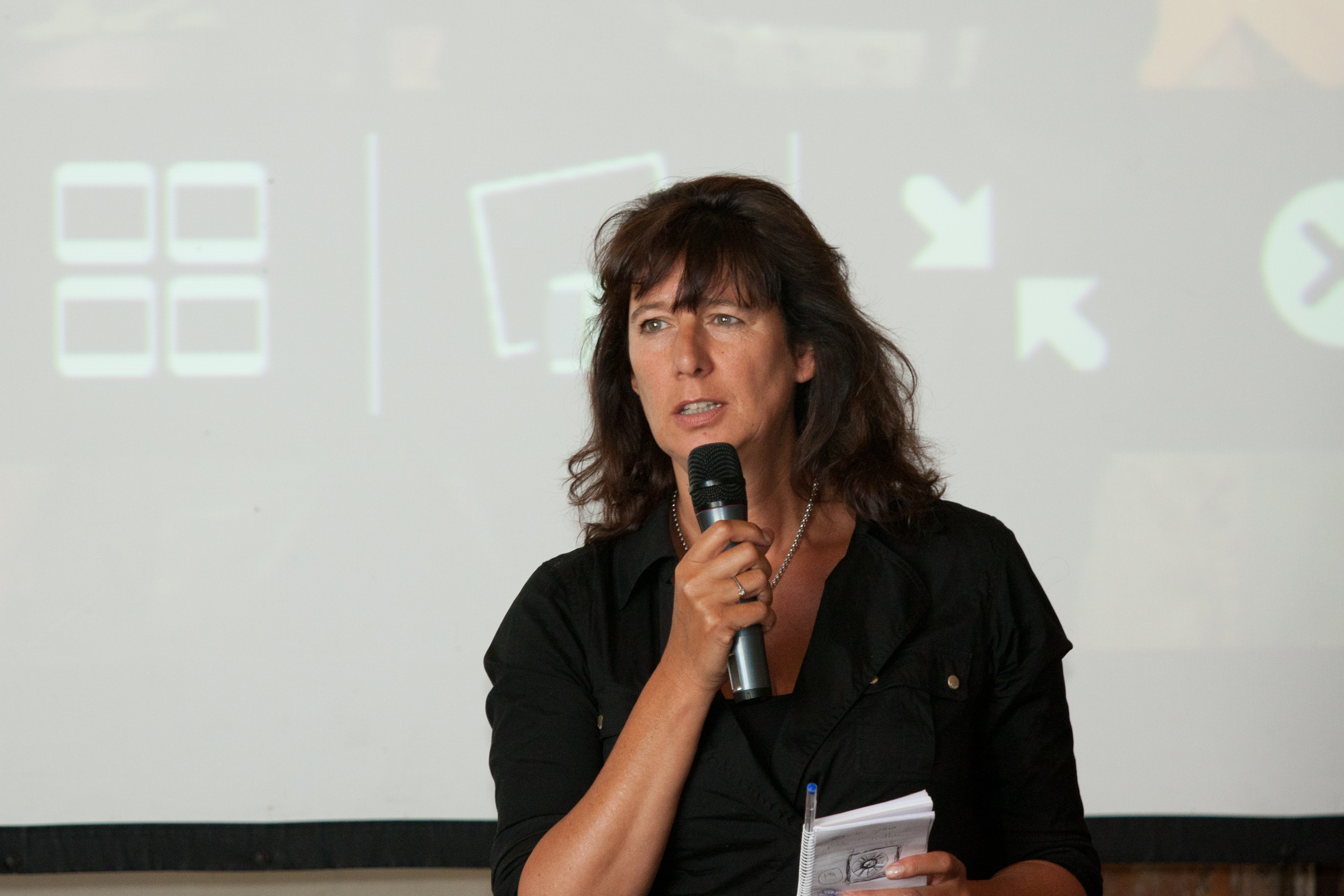
- Born: utrecht, Netherlands 1965
- Occupations: Stage actress Film actress Television actress Television director Documentary filmmaker
- Known for: Couscous and Colaare you there" "ik ben er even niet" "Descending the mountain"
- Awards: Dutch Academy Award Golden Calf for Best ActressBest feature documentary for "Ik ben er even niet"

Maartje Nevejan (born in Tilburg, Netherlands, and raised in Utrecht) is a Dutch documentary filmmaker, best known for multimedia productions like 14 and one stations, Couscous & Cola. and The National Canta Ballet

== Background ==
Nevejan performed in theater for 10 years and has been working as a director in the media since 1997. She studied acting at Stella Adler in New York City and with the Peter Brook company in Rome, Italy in the ‘80s. She graduated from the Amsterdamse Toneelschool & Kleinkunstacademie in Amsterdam, Netherlands in 1987.

== Career ==
Nevejan acted for Art & Pro for Frans Strijards (Handke, Strijards, Chekhov), and performed in several other theater groups and tv productions. She formed her own group “De Akteurs” from 1991 to 1997, and switched to documentary filmmaking in 1997. She has worked for KRO, BRT, BNN, Al Jazeera and Human.

Nevejan was married to architect Rein Jansma (1959–2023). She is currently teaching documentary film at the Master Non Linear Narrative in The Hague.

=== Partial filmography ===
As filmmaker

- 14 and one stations, (15 episodes 1999–2000), KRO, BRT, Finland
- Come with me in the Void, (2001) (30 min BRT, KRO
- Esperanza Divina, (2001) (90 min. video)
- Just the way it is supposed to be, (2002) (30 min. AIDS-Congress Barcelona)
- Virtual Fatherlands, (2003) (50 min. documentary), Viewpoint Fiction Value, Festival, show, short film
- Couscous and Cola to America, (8 episodes, 2004)
- Double portrait (2004) (BNN, short documentary)
- Youngsters and the news, (2006) (FunX/BNN)
- Couscous and Cola to Africa, (9 episodes, 2007) (BNN)
- Couscous Global website, (265 minimovies, 2008)
- Theo van Gogh? Die is dood, (59 min., Collumn/HUMAN, 2009)
- The other Sudan, (2009) (Museumpiece Leiden)
- Sophie and Saar, (2009) (15 min., IDFA)
- De Prik en Het Meisje (2011) ( 58 min., HUMAN/IDTV); also known as "Once upon a vaccination"; official selection Nederlands Film Festival 2011
- De Inboorling: (2011, Viewpoint/Leesmij)
- Het Nationale Canta Ballet:(2012, Viewpoint/NTR)
- 'Wij zitten vast' (2015) (TV series BNN, 8x40 min.)
- 'Harry, Tiny en Sonja' (2015) (58 min, HUMAN)
- 'Ik ben er even niet'/'Are You There? (2019) (92 min/58 min VPRO)
- "Descending the Mountain", (2021) (50 min. documentary MNP)

As actress

- Ornithopter (1985)
- Broos (1997)
- 12 steden, 13 ongelukken (1 episode, 1991) (TV)
- De weg naar school (1 episode, 1993) (TV)

== Recognition ==
When Couscous & Cola received the 2005 'Silver Zebra' Media Award, the jury announced "Hele spannende televisie. Prachtige verhalen. Soms schrijnend. Zet de doelgroep aan het denken. Een moderne roadmovie. Flitsende beelden, snelle montages." (Very exciting television. Beautiful stories. Sometimes poignant. Put the audience thinking. A modern road movie. Flashing images, rapid montages.)

=== Awards and nominations ===
- 1997, Dutch Academy Award Golden Calf for Best Actress at the Netherlands Film Festival for Broos
- 2001, 14 stations, ecce homo was nominated 'Best Film' at the Trento Film Festival
- 2005, Zilveren Zebra (Silver Zebra), Dutch Media Award for Couscous & Cola
- 2005 Nominated for a Golden Rose at the Rose d'Or Competition in the category ’Social Awareness Award’ for Couscous & Cola
- 2008, Nominated for an Emmy Award for Couscous & Cola part2: Africa
- 2019 Nominated Gouden Kalf, best documentary 2019
- 2019 InScience International Film Festival, winner Vakjury award best documentary'Ik ben er even niet'
- 2020 Dutch Directors Guild Interactive Award, with Niki Smit for 'In my absence'
