= Trams in The Hague =

Tram network in the Netherlands

Coordinates: 52°05′N 04°19′E

The Hague Tram
- Tram and light rail

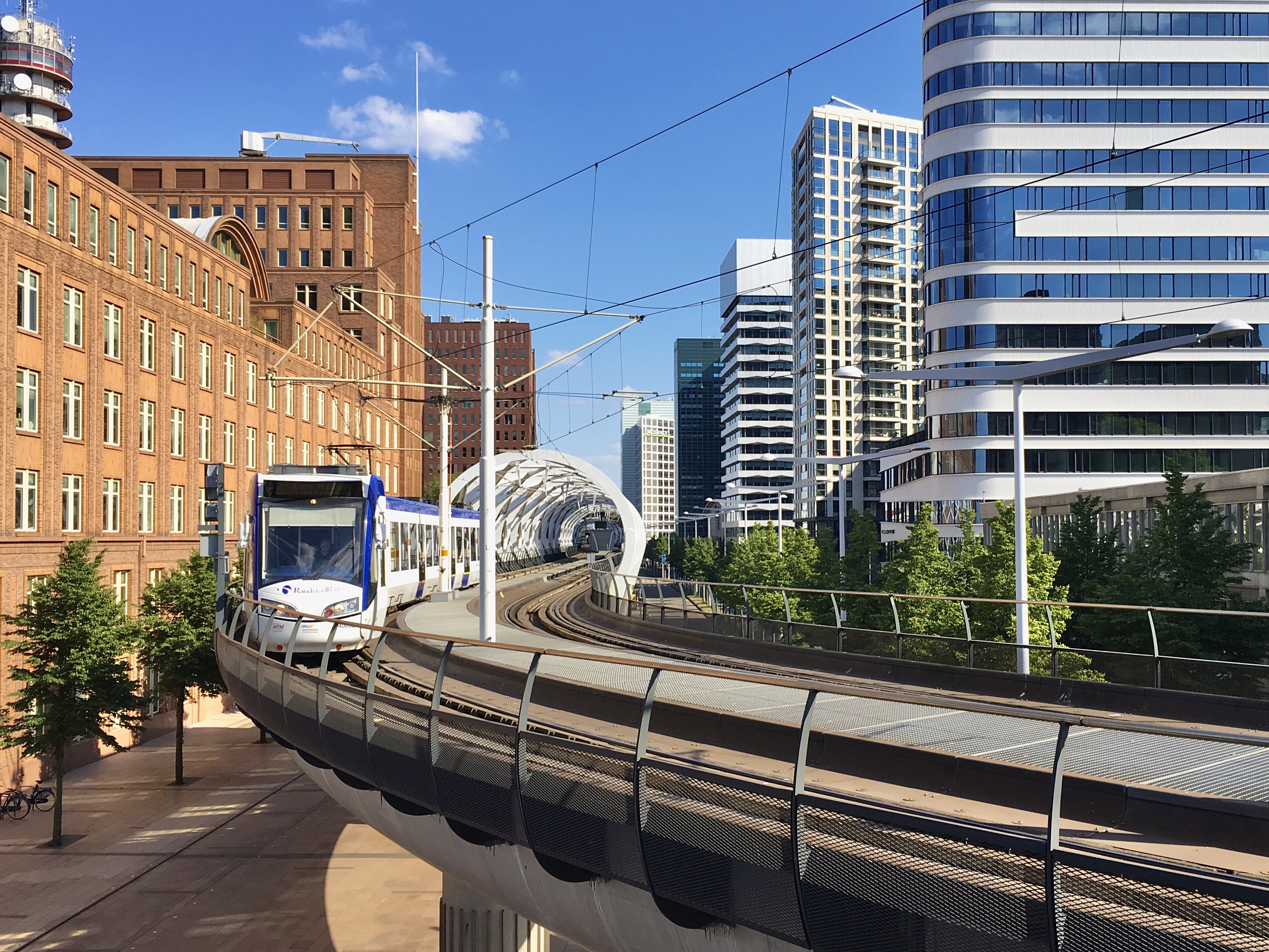
- RegioCitadis of RandstadRail for tram lines 3, 4 and 34 leaving the Beatrixkwartier station

Operation
- Locale: The Hague, Netherlands

Statistics
Horsecar era: 1864; 162 years ago–1907; 119 years ago
- Status: Discontinued
- Lines: 8 lines
- Track gauge: 1,435 mm (4 ft 8 1/2 in) standard gauge
Steam tram era: 1879–1932
- Status: Discontinued
- Track gauge: 1,435 mm (4 ft 8 1/2 in) standard gauge
Electric tram era: 1904–present
- Status: Operational
- Lines: 10 tram lines 2 light rail lines
- Owner: Municipality of The Hague
- Operators: HTM Personenvervoer (since 2002)
- Track gauge: 1,435 mm (4 ft 8 1/2 in) standard gauge
- Electrification: 600 V DC Catenary (also 750 V DC for tram-train vehicles)
- Depots: Lijsterbesstraat; Scheveningen; Zichtenburg
- Stock: 70 GTL8; 70 Siemens Avenio; 71 Alstom RegioCitadis
- Route length: 117 kilometres (73 mi)
- Stops: 204
- 2018: 83,967,000
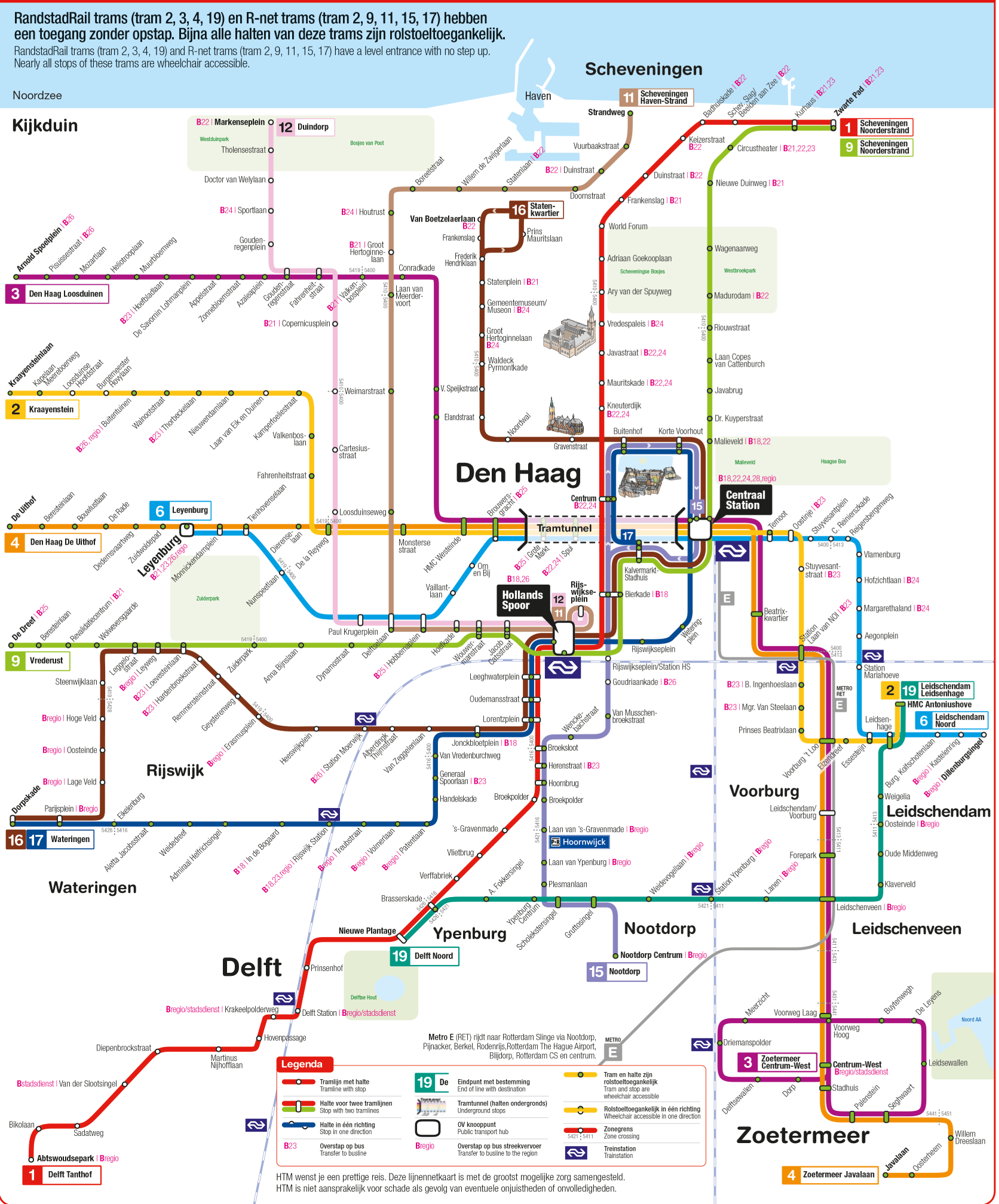
- Website: www.htm.nl

The Hague Tram (Dutch: Haagse tram) is a tram network forming part of the public transport system in and around the city of The Hague in South Holland, Netherlands.

Opened in 1864, as of 2018 the network has twelve tram lines, three of which were built to light rail standards and operate under the RandstadRail brand. The network has 117 kilometres of rails and 241 stops. The network is owned by the Municipality of The Hague and operated by HTM Personenvervoer (HTM) since 2002 HTM is the successor of N.V. Gemengd Bedrijf Haagsche Tramweg-Maatschappij (1 January 1927 – 11 June 2002) and before that N.V. Haagsche Tramweg-Maatschappij (HTM) (1 May 1887 – 1 January 1927).

The network serves six municipalities outside of The Hague: Rijswijk, Leidschendam-Voorburg, Delft, Pijnacker-Nootdorp, Zoetermeer, and Westland.

== History ==
=== Horse-drawn trams ===
On 21 March 1864, the Dutch Tramway Company was founded in The Hague, inaugurating the first tram network in the Netherlands. The first lines in The Hague were horse-drawn. By 1880, the system had expanded, featuring trams with only a single horse, transporting passengers to destinations like Javastraat and Frederikstraat.

In the first half of the 1880s, steam trams appeared and rapidly replaced the horse-drawn lines, especially in longer services. One of these was the line between The Hague and Delft in July 1887, which is still in service today and extended to Scheveningen Noord. On 17 May 1887, the NV Haagsche Tramweg-Maatschappij (HTM) was formed after acquiring the Belgian company Société Anonyme des Tramways de La Haye, marking the birth of HTM.

=== Electric trams ===
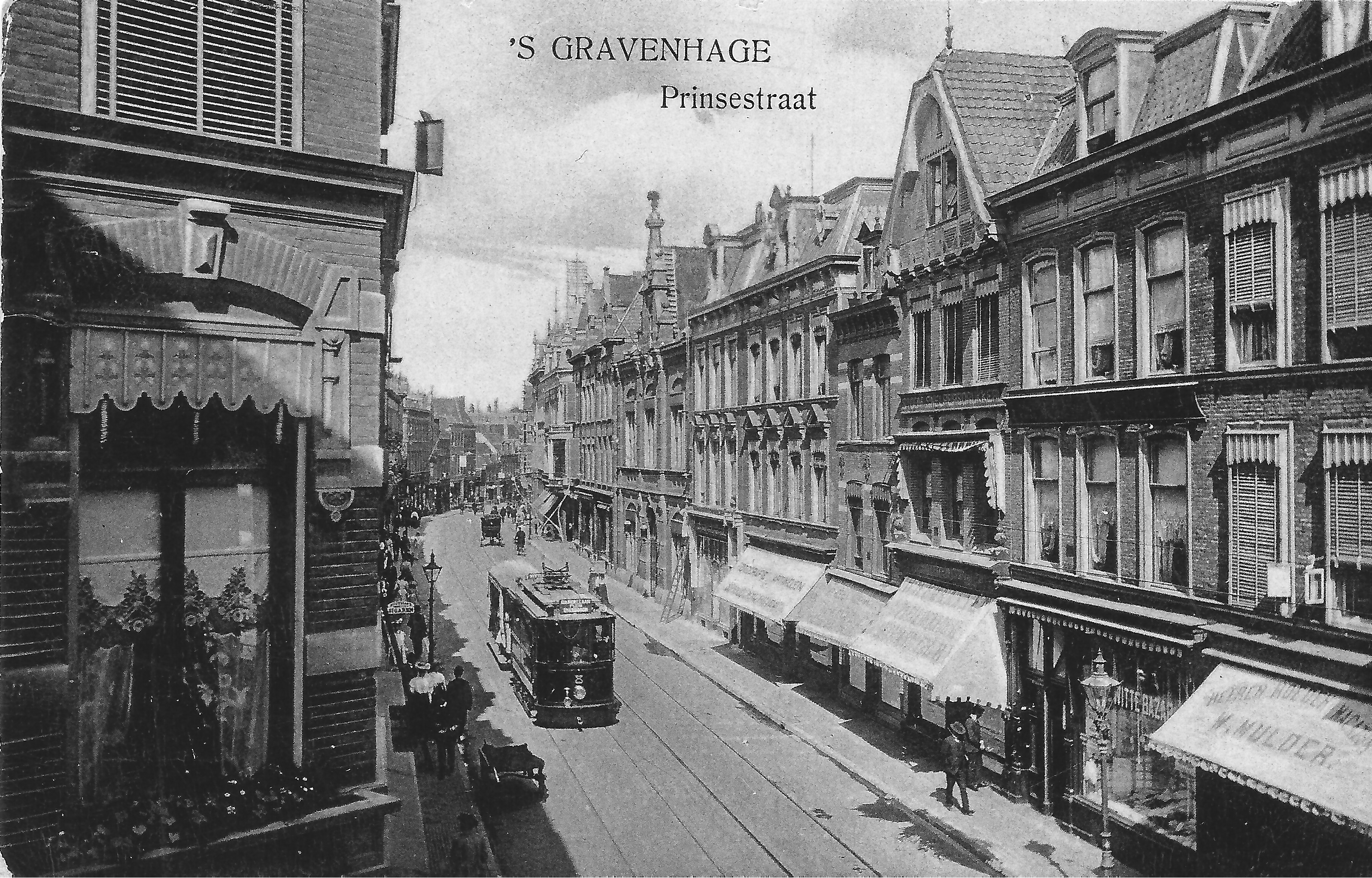
A tram on Prinsestraat in 1907

Electric trams powered by batteries functioned in passenger service from 1890 to 1904. In August 1904, the first electrified line went into service; this is now part of line 9 between Plein and Scheveningen Kurhaus. Most of this line is still part of the line between Vrederust and Scheveningen Noord. Due to numerous technical problems, the battery tram had to give way to the electric longline tram.

By 1915, Scheveningen had become a popular destination for summer beachgoers, leading to long queues at the stop in front of the Kurhaus at the end of the day. In 1916, when many men were deployed to military service during World War I, female conductors appeared on trams.

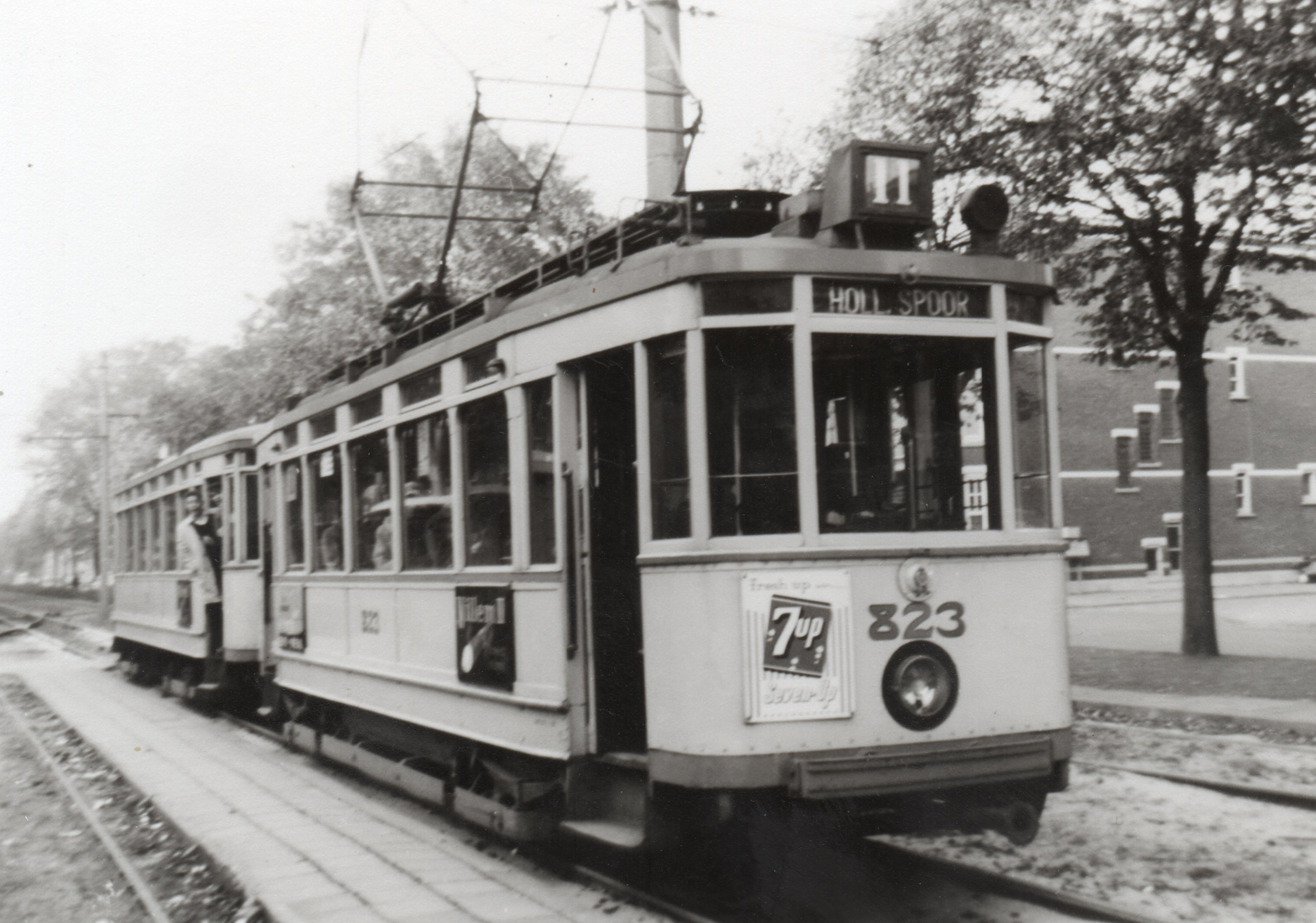
A series 800 car with trailer

The system expanded throughout the 1920s. By 1926, HTM operated 16 tram lines, and the population of The Hague was nearly 410,000. The tram system facilitated over 53 million tram and bus trips annually. However, the economic downturn following the 1929 stock market crash resulted in reduced passenger numbers and fewer ambitions for further expansions. In 1927 a former branch line from the HIJSM was transferred to the HTM and electrified. The former exclusive alignement was taken over and resulted in the need to buy tramcars with a higher topspeed compared to the existing trams: the serie 800.

In response to the declining number of passengers during the economic crisis, the 1930s saw the introduction of one-man trams. These were more economical and increasingly replaced the larger trams with trailers. In the 1940s, ridership surged, rising from 60 million in 1940 to 138 million in 1943.

=== Post-WW2 developments ===
After World War II, HTM began buying more modern trams to compete with the growing use of private cars, most notably the U.S. designed PCC-car. In the 1960s, ticket stamping machines were introduced, and advertising on trams helped generate additional revenue. In 1963 suggestions from Friedrich Lehner were first carried out (Lehner Plan): light occupied tram lines were replaced by buses, and HTM purchased 330 buses to serve this purpose.

=== Grade separated infrastructure ===
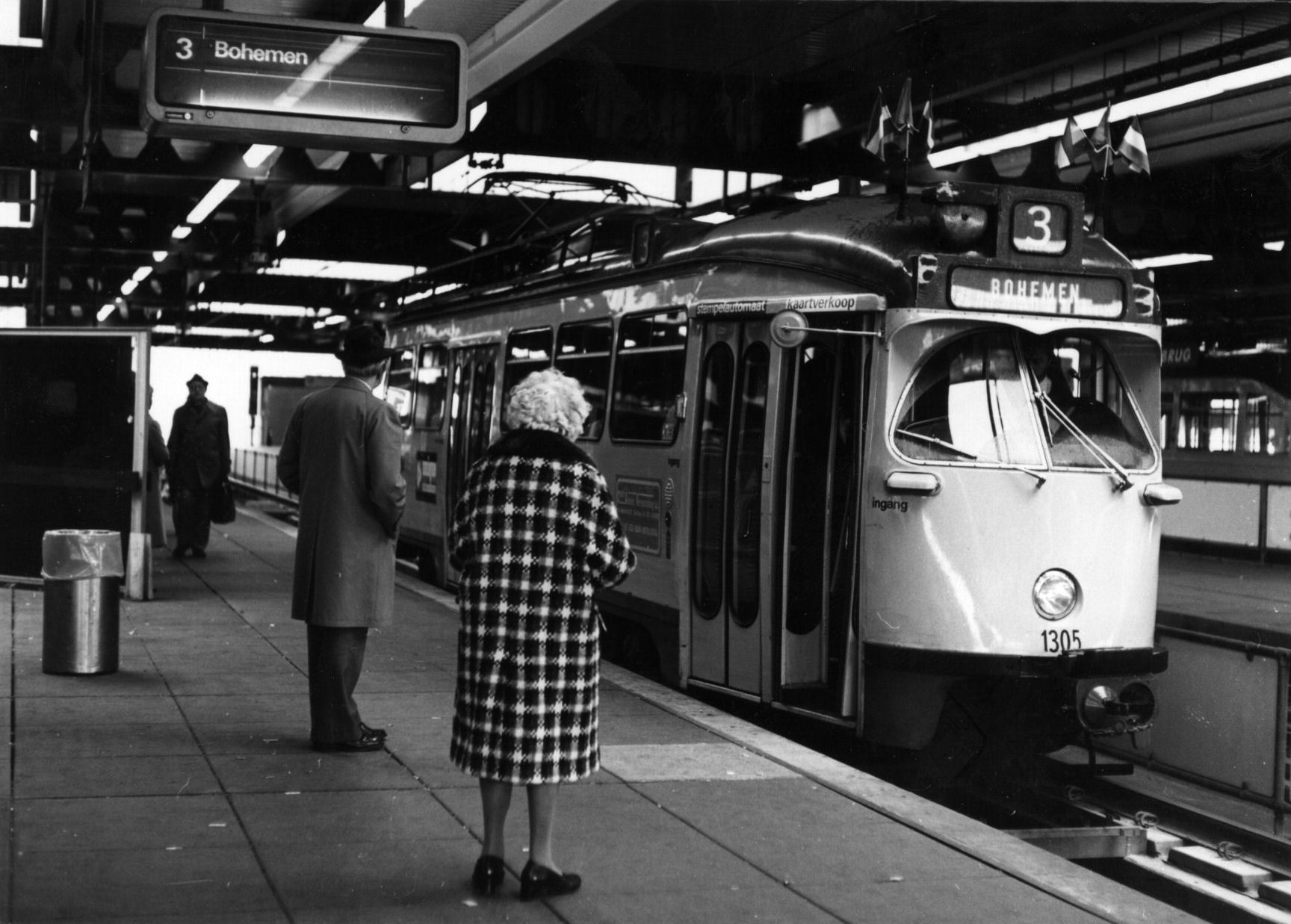
Line 3 at Den Haag Centraal in 1980

A proposal by Friedrich Lehner from 1964, was formalised in 1969, in a document called Nota Openbaar Vervoer 1969 (lit. 'Memorandum, public transport, 1969'). This memorandum contained plans for a new Central Station, urban rail transit to satellite town Zoetermeer and a proposal including a combination of new tunnels and viaducts to improve tram operations, described as 'semi-metro'. In 1973, The Hague's new Central Station was opened, to accommodate the growing number of passengers. The new station would get new elevated tram tracks with platforms above the station concourse in 1976.

In 2004, the construction of a tram tunnel under the city centre, around the intersection of Spui, Kalvermarkt and Grote Marktstraat, was completed to address congestion. In 2006, the RandstadRail network and brand was introduced, connecting The Hague with the Zoetermeer and Rotterdam regions. The tram-train lines to Zoetermeer for the RandstadRail project opened on 29 October 2006 (line 4) and on 20 October 2007 (line 3) respectively, including the addition of Beatrixkwartier station.

=== New lines ===
In 1983, for the first time since WW2, a new tramline was opened: Line 2. At the same time the tram network is restructured: Line 1 from Delft to The Hague city centre was extended to Scheveningen and Line 12 and Line 16 were connected to form a ring line in the city centre. In addition, the Sijtwendetunnel, featuring one underground station Oosteinde, was opened in 2010 exclusively for a new Line 19.

== Future plans ==
=== Infrastructure upgrades ===
New trams will replace GTL trams on lines 1, 6 and 12, necessitating adjustments to tram tracks and stops. These modifications involve realigning tracks, adjusting corners, and lengthening tram stops to accommodate the new trams and ensure accessibility. Lines 1 and 16 have already been upgraded for similar reasons.

=== Vlietlijn ===
A proposed new tram connection, the Vlietlijn (part of the Koningscorridor), aims to connect Den Haag Centraal via the Binckhorstlaan with Voorburg, Rijswijk, and Delft, running parallel to existing train track, to reduce traffic congestion from new housing and business developments in the area.

==== Zuidwestlandcorridor ====
There are proposals to improve accessibility from The Hague Zuidwest (formerly Leywegcorridor) to the city centre and Zoetermeer. With options exploring adaptation to existing infrastructure, such as the tram tunnel and railway at Leidschenveen, where RandstadRail lines 3 & 4, and Rotterdam Metro line E stop. The infrastructure limits the possibility of increasing tram frequency.

== Infrastructure ==
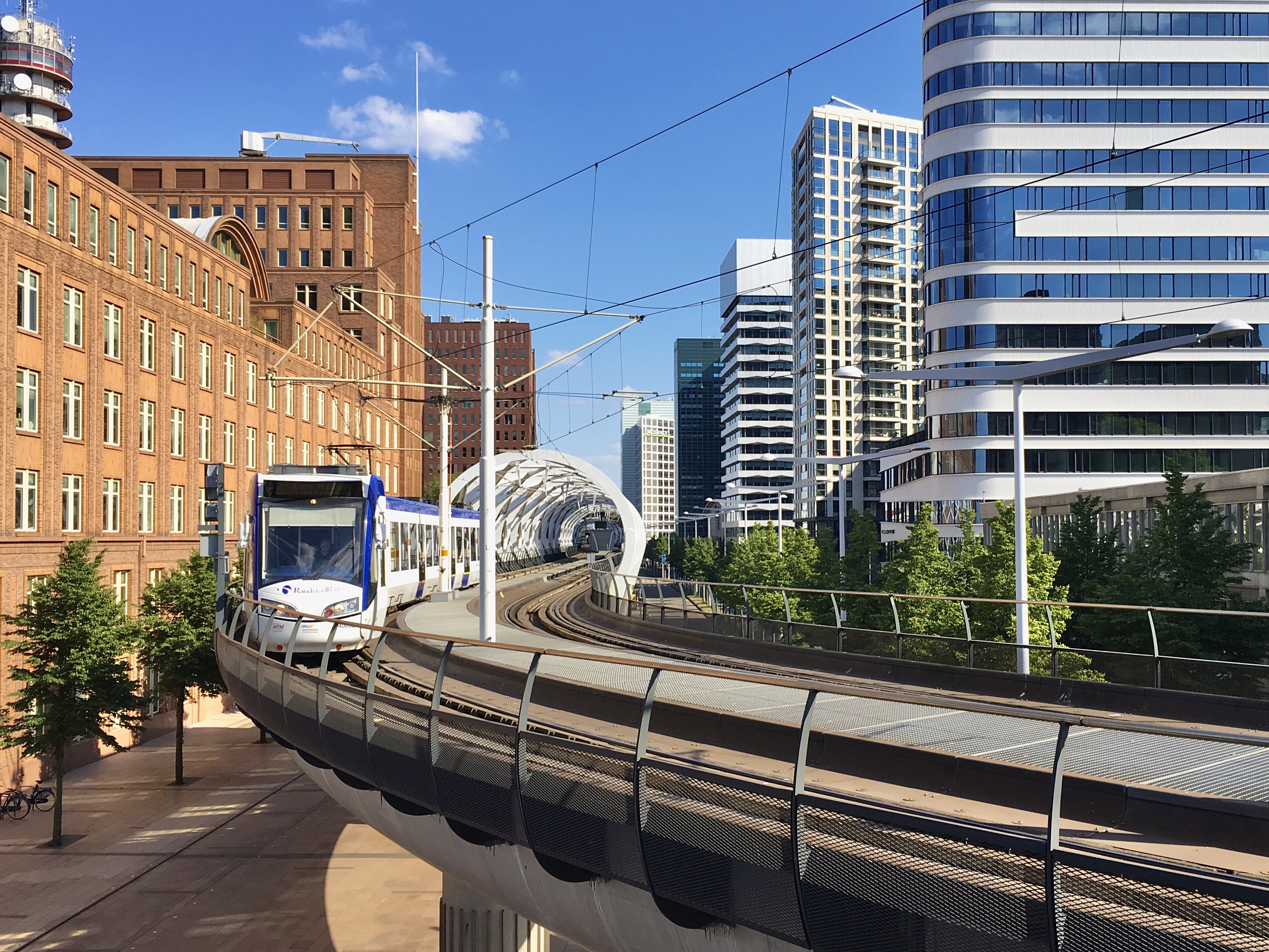
Viaduct through Beatrixkwartier

The tracks are standard gauge, measuring 1,435 mm (4 ft 8+1/2 in), and are electrified using a 600 V DC catenary system, with some sections also capable of operating at 750 V DC for tram-train vehicles. The network's maintenance facilities are located at Lijsterbesstraat, Scheveningen, and Zichtenburg.

The city centre tunnel for trams, measuring 1.25 kilometres (0.78 mi), was opened in March 2004. The tunnel forms the western section of a grade-separated section.

To the east, the tunnel connects to an elevated viaduct, which was opened in 1976 and includes stops at Centraal Station (CS) and Ternoot. This viaduct also features the Viaduct through Beatrixkwartier for RandstadRail trams, linking to the former Hofpleinlijn near Den Haag Laan van NOI railway station. RandstadRail lines 3, 4, and 34 use this connection. East of Laan van NOI, they share tracks and stations with Rotterdam Metro line E as far as Leidschendam-Voorburg, before diverging onto the former Zoetermeer Stadslijn towards Zoetermeer.

== Rolling stock ==
As of 2024, the HTM tram fleet consists of approximately 200 trams of three types, with a further model set to enter service in 2026.

=== GTL8 ===
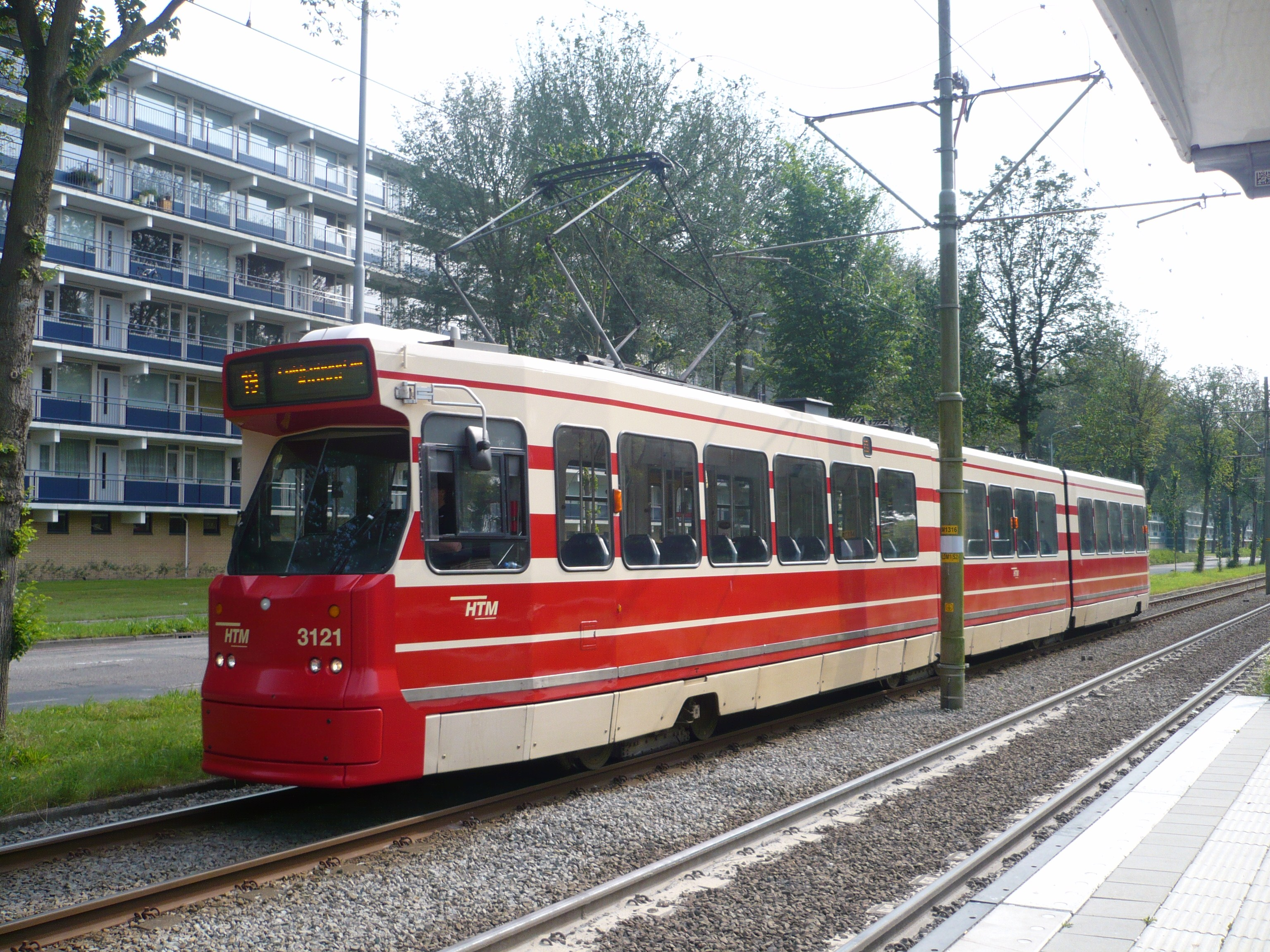
GTL8

GTL8 trams are eight-axle, three-section articulated trams with a red-and-beige livery. They are uni-directional with a cab at only one end. The 147 trams were built by La Brugeoise et Nivelles in Bruges, Belgium (later Bombardier Transportation) in two generations. About 55 remain in revenue service.

The first generation, GTL8-I, consists of 100 trams delivered from 1981-1984, while the second generation, GTL8-II, includes 47 trams delivered from 1992-1993.

These trams operate on tram lines 1, 6, and 12, serving Den Haag, Rijswijk, Voorburg, Leidschendam, and Delft. The GTL8 trams have relatively narrow entrances with steps, making them less accessible for passengers with reduced mobility. They are gradually being phased out alongside the introduction the new Stadler TINA trams.

One GTL8-I tram (number 3035) has been converted into a moving restaurant tram, and features a dining interior, kitchen, and a toilet.

=== Avenio ===
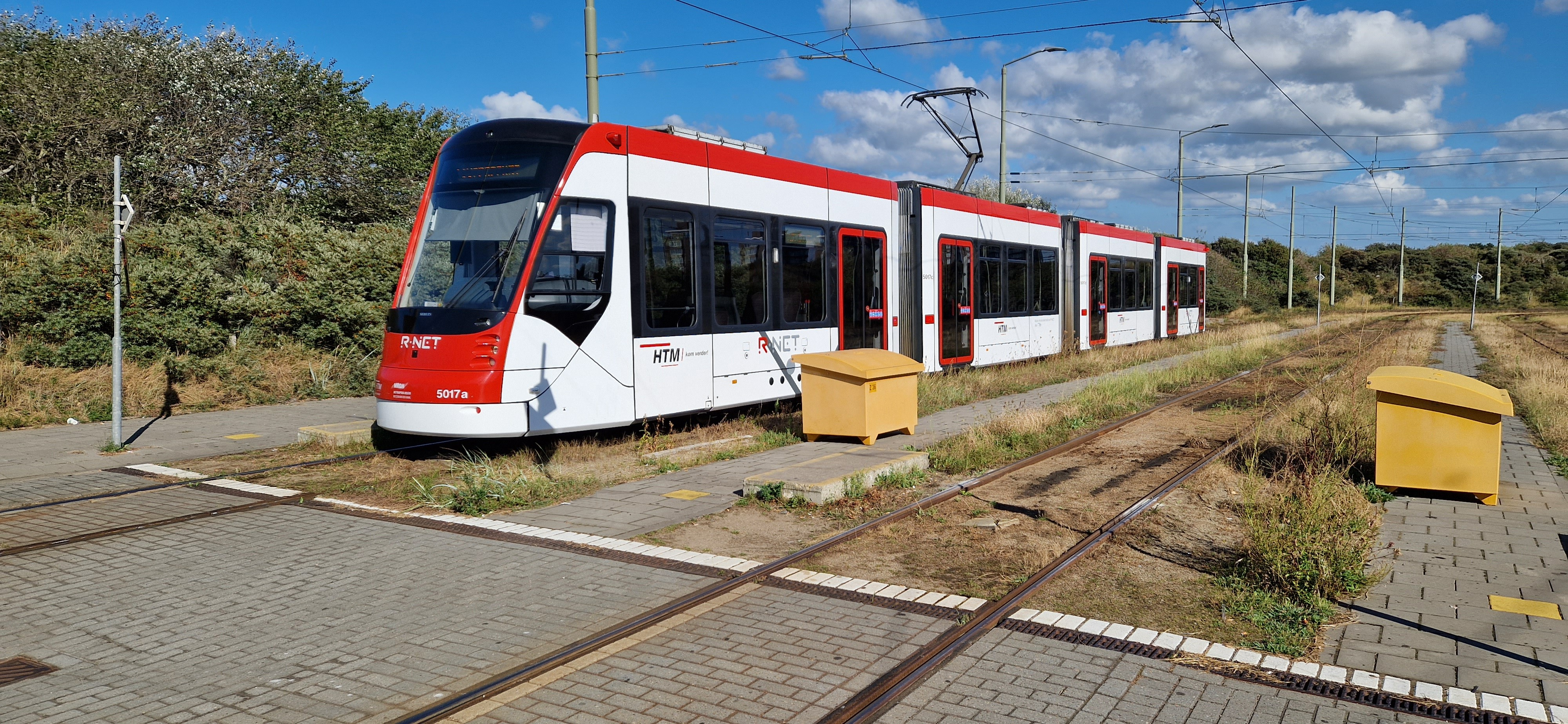
Avenio

Avenio trams are four-section, 100% low-floor trams with a red-and-white R-net livery. They are bi-directional with cabs on both ends. 70 trams were built by Siemens Mobility in Germany, with 40 ordered in 2011, 20 in 2014, and another 10 in 2017.

Built from 2014 onwards, they have been in service since 2015, gradually replacing older GTL8 trams. These trams operate on lines 2, 9, 11, 15, 16, and 17. Since 2023, their livery has been updated from grey-red to white-red to improve their visibility. The Avenio trams feature wide, level boarding doors, dedicated spaces for wheelchairs and pushchairs, and digital information screens.

=== RegioCitadis ===
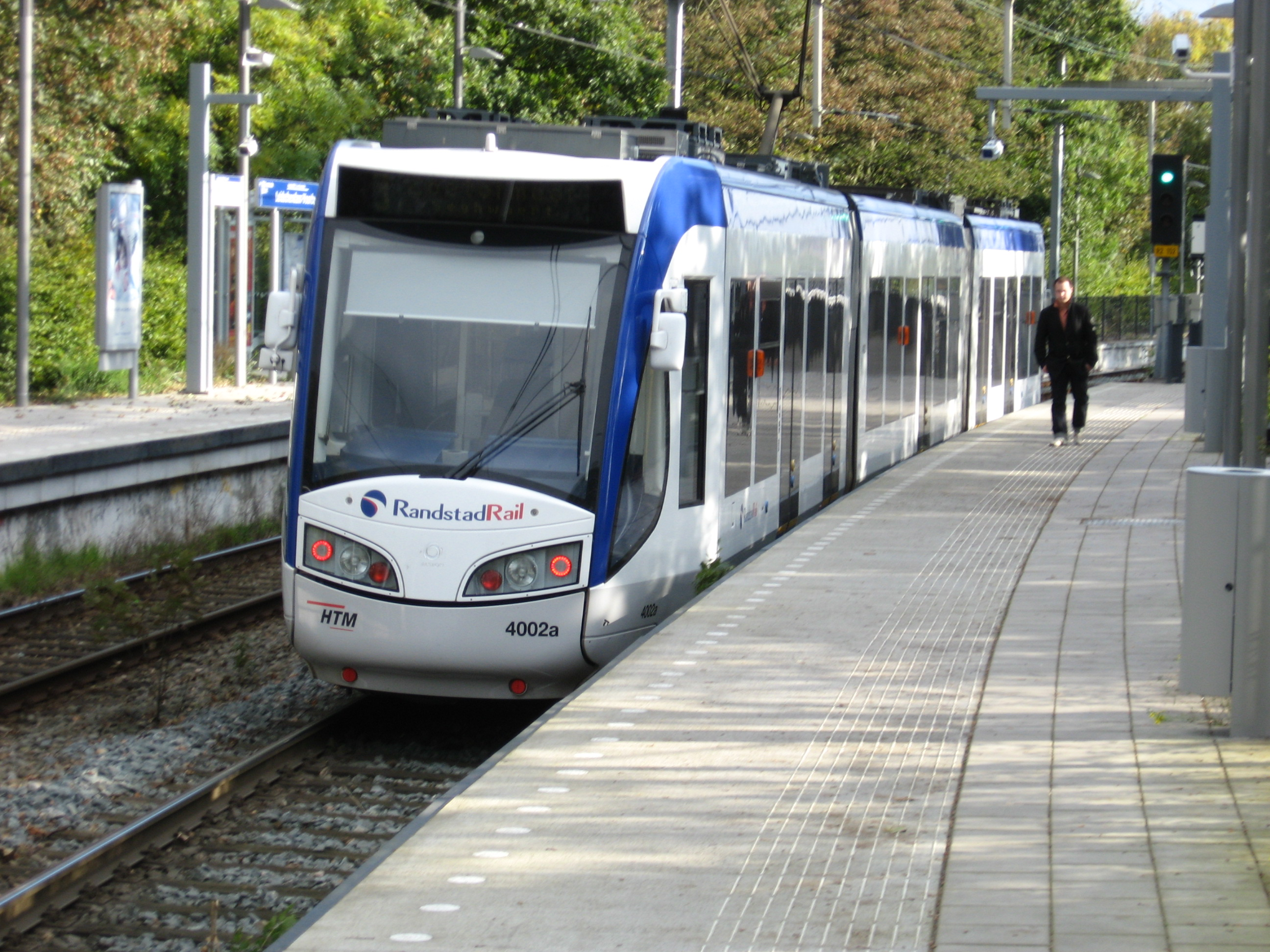
RegioCitadis

RegioCitadis trams are three-section, 70% low-floor light rail/tram-train vehicles with dual-voltage capabilities. They have a blue-and-white RandstadRail livery and are bi-directional. 72 trams were built by Alstom in Salzgitter, Germany, with 54 entering service in 2006-2007 and a further 18 in 2011.

They operate on RandstadRail lines 3, 4, and 34 between The Hague and Zoetermeer, as well as on lines 2 and 19 when used as city trams. These trams have five wide, low-entry doors and offer space for bicycles outside of peak hours. They are used as tram-trains on the lines to Zoetermeer and are also used on line 19 between Leidschendam and Delft.

=== TINA ===
Stadler TINA tram

The first of 62 TINA trams from Stadler Rail arrived in The Hague in August 2025 entering service in September 2026. These are the first TINA trams to operate in the Netherlands, and as of 2026, HTM is Stadler's largest TINA customer. TINA trams will gradually replace the aging GTL8 fleet. Six of the 62 trams ordered were funded by the Metropoolregio Rotterdam Den Haag. The TINA trams are fully low-floor, with step-free access. Public consultations in 2023 contributed to their interior design. The bidirectional trams are 36.5 metres (120 ft) long, 2.65 metres (8 ft 8 in) wide and have a capacity for 230 passengers with 68 fixed seats and 16 folding seats. The trams have a battery pack allowing 1.26 kilometres (0.78 mi) of travel without an overhead wire. Capturing braking energy reduces energy requirements by 25 percent. The first TINA trams are being manufactured in Środa Wielkopolska, Poland.

The TINA trams would initially run on line 2. Eventually, they will run on lines 1, 2, 6, 9, 10, 11, 12, 15, 16 and 17 along with Avenio trams. TINA trams, however, will not be used on RandstadRail lines 3, 4 and 34 due to incompatibility with their signaling and train protection systems.

== Lines ==
Line
1	Scheveningen Noord - Delft Tanthof
2	Den Haag Kraayenstein - Leidschendam
3	Den Haag Loosduinen - Zoetermeer Centrum
4	Den Haag De Uithof - Zoetermeer - Lansingerland-Zoetermeer
6	Den Haag Leyenburg - Leidschendam Noord
9	Scheveningen Noord - Vrederust
11	Scheveningen Haven - Den Haag HS railway station
12	Den Haag Duindorp - Den Haag HS railway station
15	Den Haag Centraal railway station - Nootdorp
16	Den Haag Statenkwartier - Wateringen
17	Den Haag Centraal railway station - Wateringen
19	Leidschendam - TU Delft
34	De Savornin Lohmanplein - Lansingerland-Zoetermeer

=== Line 1 ===
Line 1: Scheveningen Noord - Delft Tanthof

Zwarte Pad - Kurhaus - Scheveningseslag/Beelden aan Zee - Badhuiskade - Keizerstraat - Duinstraat - Frankenslag - World Forum - Adriaan Goekooplaan - Ary van der Spuyweg - Vredespaleis - Javastraat - Mauritskade - Kneuterdijk - Centrum - Bierkade - Station Hollands Spoor - Leeghwaterplein - Oudemansstraat - Lorentzplein - Broeksloot - Herenstraat - Hoornbrug - Broekpolder - 's-Gravenmade - Vlietbrug - Verffabriek - Brasserskade - Nieuwe Plantage - Prinsenhof - Delft Station - Krakeelpolderweg - Hovenpassage - Martinus Nijhofflaan - Diepenbrockstraat - Van der Slootsingel - Sadatweg - Bikolaan - Abtswoudsepark

=== Line 2 ===
Line 2: Den Haag Kraayenstein - Leidschendam

Kraayensteinlaan - Kapelaan Meereboerweg - Loosduinse Hoofdstraat - Burgemeester Hovylaan - Buitentuinen - Walnootstraat - Thorbeckelaan - Nieuwendamlaan - Laan van Eik en Duinen - Kamperfoeliestraat - Valkenboslaan - De la Reyweg - Monstersestraat - HMC Westeinde - Brouwersgracht - Grote Markt - Spui - Centraal Station - Ternoot - Oostinje - Stuyvesantstraat - Station Laan van NOI - Bruijnings Ingenhoeslaan - Mgr. van Steelaan - Prinses Beatrixlaan - Voorburg 't Loo - Elzendreef - Essesteijn - Leidsenhage - HMC Antoniushove

=== Line 3 ===
- Operated as RandstadRail; tram-train

Line 3: The Hague (Den Haag) Loosduinen - Zoetermeer Centrum

Arnold Spoelplein - Pisuissestraat - Mozartlaan - Heliotrooplaan - Muurbloemweg - Hoefbladlaan - De Savornin Lohmanplein - Appelstraat - Zonnebloemstraat - Azaleaplein - Goudenregenstraat - Fahrenheitstraat - Valkenbosplein - Conradkade - Van Speijkstraat - Elandstraat - HMC Westeinde - Brouwersgracht - Grote Markt - Spui - Centraal Station - Beatrixkwartier - Laan van NOI - Voorburg 't Loo - Leidschendam-Voorburg - Forepark - Leidschenveen - Voorweg (Low Level) - Centrum-West - Stadhuis - Palenstein - Seghwaert - Leidsewallen - De Leyens - Buytenwegh - Voorweg (High Level) - Meerzicht - Driemanspolder - Delftsewallen - Dorp - Centrum-West

There are additional services between Den Haag Savornin Lohmanplein and Den Haag Centraal railway station during rush hours

=== Line 4 ===
Line 4: Den Haag De Uithof - Lansingerland-Zoetermeer

De Uithof - Beresteinlaan - Bouwlustlaan - De Rade - Dedemsvaartweg - Zuidwoldepad - Leyenburg - Monnickendamplein - Tienhovenselaan - Dierenselaan - De la Reyweg - Monstersestraat - HMC Westeinde - Brouwersgracht - Grote Markt - Spui - Centraal Station - Beatrixkwartier - Laan van NOI - Voorburg 't Loo - Leidschendam-Voorburg - Forepark - Leidschenveen - Voorweg (Low Level) - Centrum-West - Stadhuis - Palenstein - Seghwaert - Willem Dreeslaan - Oosterheem - Javalaan - Van Tuyllpark - Lansingerland-Zoetermeer

=== Line 6 ===
Line 6: Den Haag Leyenburg - Leidschendam Noord

Leyenburg - Monnickendamplein - Tienhovenselaan - Nunspeetlaan - Paul Krugerplein - Delftselaan - Haagse Markt - Vaillantlaan - Om en Bij - Brouwersgracht - Grote Markt - Spui - Centraal Station - Ternoot - Oostinje - Stuyvesantplein - Carel Reinierszkade - Reigersbergenweg - Vlamenburg - Hofzichtlaan - Margarethaland - Aegonplein - Station Mariahoeve - Essesteijn - Leidsenhage - Burgemeester Kolfschotenlaan - Kastelenring - Dillenburgsingel

=== Line 9 ===
Line 9: Scheveningen Noorderstrand - Vrederust

Zwarte Pad - Kurhaus - Circustheater - Nieuwe Duinweg - Wagenaarweg - Madurodam - Riouwstraat - Laan Copes van Cattenburch - Javabrug - Dr. Kuyperstraat - Malieveld - Centraal Station - Kalvermarkt-Stadhuis - Bierkade - Station Hollands Spoor - Jacob Catsstraat - Wouwermanstraat - Dynamostraat - Anna Bijnslaan - Zuiderpark - Loevesteinlaan - Leyweg - Leggelostraat - Wolweversgaarde - Revalidatiecentrum - Beresteinlaan - De Dreef

=== Line 11 ===
Line 11: Scheveningen Haven - Den Haag HS railway station

Strandweg - Vuurbaakstraat - Duinstraat - Doornstraat - Statenlaan - Willem de Zwijgerlaan - Boreelstraat - Houtrust - Groot Hertoginnelaan - Laan van Meerdervoort - Weimarstraat - Loosduinseweg - Delftselaan - Haagse Markt - Hoefkade - Wouwermanstraat - Jacob Catsstraat - Station Hollands Spoor - Rijswijkseplein

=== Line 12 ===
Line 12: Den Haag Duindorp - Den Haag HS railway station

Markenseplein - Tholensestraat - Doctor van Welylaan - Sportlaan - Goudenregenplein - Goudenregenstraat - Fahrenheitstraat - Copernicusplein - Weimarstraat - Cartesiusstraat - Loosduinseweg - Paul Krugerplein - Delftselaan - Haagse Markt - Hoefkade - Wouwermanstraat - Jacob Catsstraat - Station Hollands Spoor - Rijswijkseplein

=== Line 15 ===
Line 15: Den Haag Centraal railway station - Nootdorp

Centraal Station - Korte Voorhout - Buitenhof - Centrum - Bierkade - Waldorpstraat/Station Hollands Spoor - Goudriaankade - Van Musschenbroekstraat - Wenckebachstraat - Broeksloot - Herenstraat - Hoornbrug - Broekpolder - Laan van 's-Gravenmade (P+R Hoornwijck) - Laan van Ypenburg - Plesmanlaan - Scholekstersingel - Gruttosingel - Nootdorp Centrum

=== Line 16 ===
Line 16: Den Haag Statenkwartier - Wateringen

Van Boetzelaerlaan - Frankenslag or Prins Mauritslaan - Frederik Hendriklaan - Statenplein - Gemeentemuseum/Museon - Groot Hertoginnelaan - Waldeck Pyrmontkade - Van Speijkstraat - Elandstraat - Noordwal - Gravenstraat - Buitenhof - Korte Voorhout - Centraal Station - Kalvermarkt-Stadhuis - Bierkade - Station Hollands Spoor - Leeghwaterplein - Oudemansstraat - Lorentzplein - Jonckbloetplein - Van Zeggelenlaan - Alberdingk Thijmstraat - Station Moerwijk - Heeswijkplein - Erasmusplein - Geysterenweg - Betje Wolffstraat - Hardenbroekstraat - Loevesteinlaan - Leyweg - Leggelostraat - Steenwijklaan - Hoge Veld - Oosteinde - Lage Veld - Parijsplein - Dorpskade

=== Line 17 ===
Line 17: Den Haag Centraal railway station - Wateringen

Centraal Station - Weteringplein - Rijswijkseplein - Station Hollands Spoor - Leeghwaterplein - Oudemansstraat - Lorentzplein - Jonckbloetplein - Van Vredenburchweg - Generaal Spoorlaan - Handelskade - Patentlaan - Volmerlaan - Treubstraat - Rijswijk Station - In de Bogaard - Admiraal Helfrichsingel - Weidedreef - Aletta Jacobsstraat - Eikelenburg - Parijsplein - Dorpskade

=== Line 19 ===
- Line 19 was extended to TU Delft on 5 October 2026. The route operates every 15 minutes and serves the university only from Monday to Friday between 07:00 and 19:00. At all other times, the usual terminus remains Delft railway station.

Line 19: Leidschendam - TU Delft

HMC Antoniushove - Leidsenhage - Weigelia - Oosteinde - Oude Middenweg - Klaverveld - Leidschenveen Centrum - Lanen - Station Ypenburg - Weidevogellaan - Gruttosingel - Scholekstersingel - Ypenburg Centrum - Anthony Fokkersingel - Brasserskade - Nieuwe Plantage - Prinsenhof - Delft Station - Zuidpoort - Julianalaan - Aula - Mekelpark - Berlageweg - Schoemakerstraat

=== Line 34 ===
- Operated as RandstadRail, line 34 is a weekday tram that combines routes 3 and 4. Introduced in 2020, it runs only during rush hours. Line 34 operates every 10 minutes with single vehicles and does not run during the summer holidays.

Line 34: De Savornin Lohmanplein - Lansingerland-Zoetermeer

De Savornin Lohmanplein - Appelstraat - Zonnebloemstraat - Azaleaplein - Goudenregenstraat - Fahrenheitstraat - Valkenbosplein - Conradkade - Van Speijkstraat - Elandstraat - HMC Westeinde - Brouwersgracht - Grote Markt - Spui - Centraal Station (perron A) - Beatrixkwartier - Laan van NOI - Voorburg 't Loo - Leidschendam-Voorburg - Forepark - Leidschenveen - Voorweg (Low Level) - Centrum-West (spoor 1) - Stadhuis - Palenstein - Seghwaert - Willem Dreeslaan - Oosterheem - Javalaan - Van Tuyllpark - Lansingerland-Zoetermeer

== Preservation ==
A number of trams from the city are preserved in the city's transport museum, the Haags Openbaar Vervoer Museum, situated in the old Frans Halsstraat tram depot, by the Wouwermanstraat stop on tram lines 9, 11 and 12.

Additionally, the city's PCC car 1147 is preserved in the UK's National Tramway Museum, where it is displayed to illustrate the evolution of tram car design around the world.

== Gallery ==
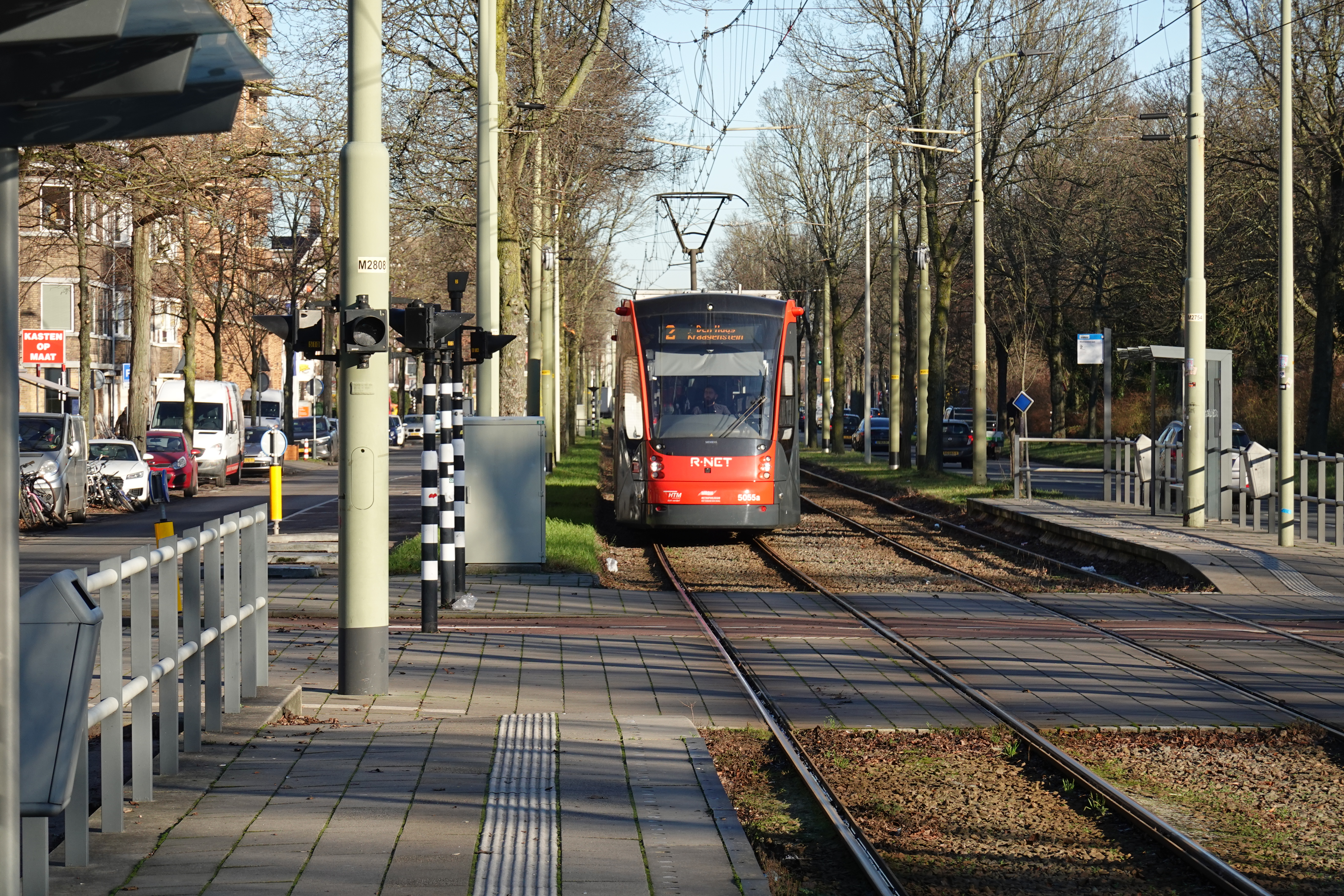
Walnootstraat tram stop

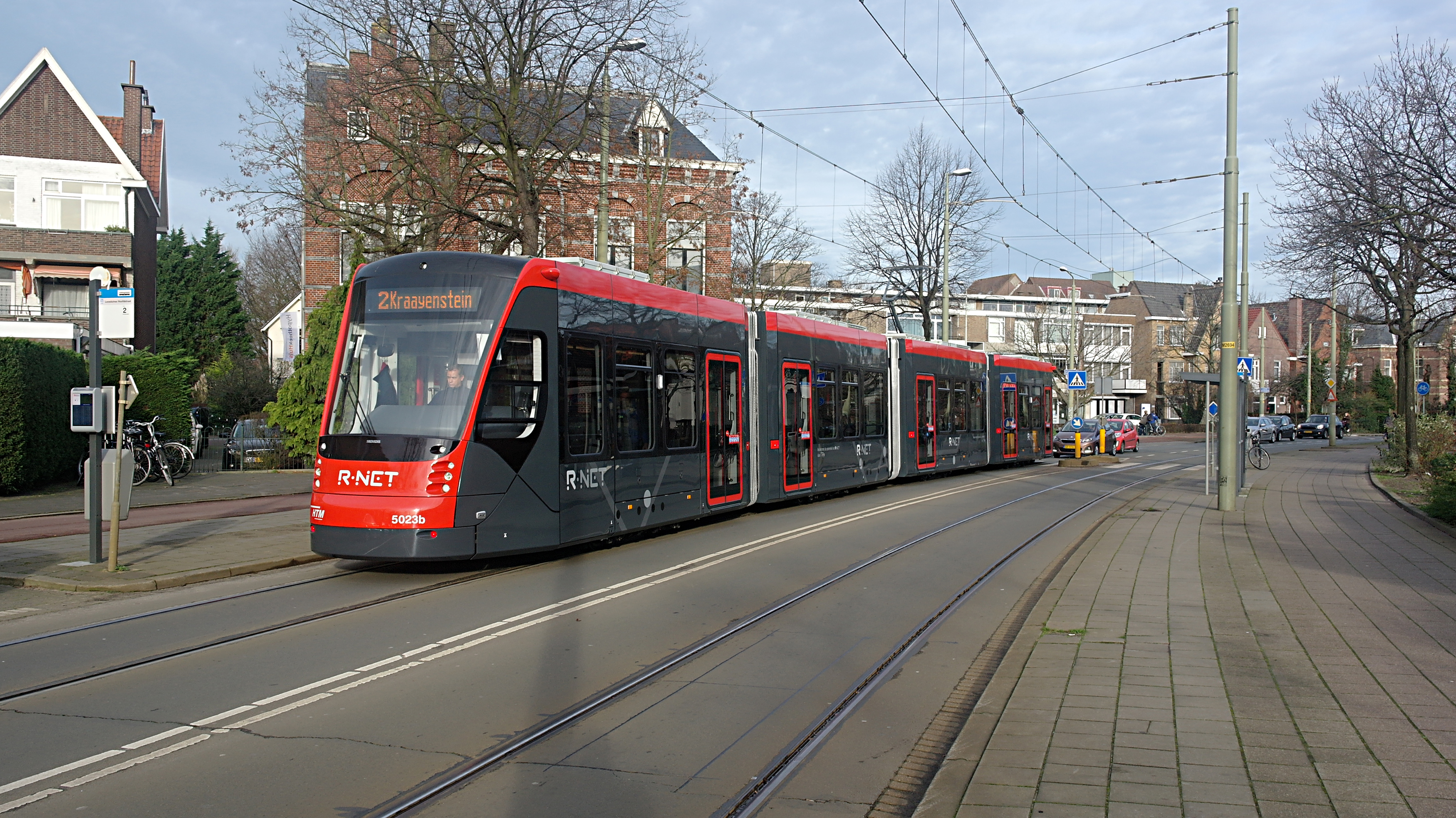
Avenio tram in Loosduinen

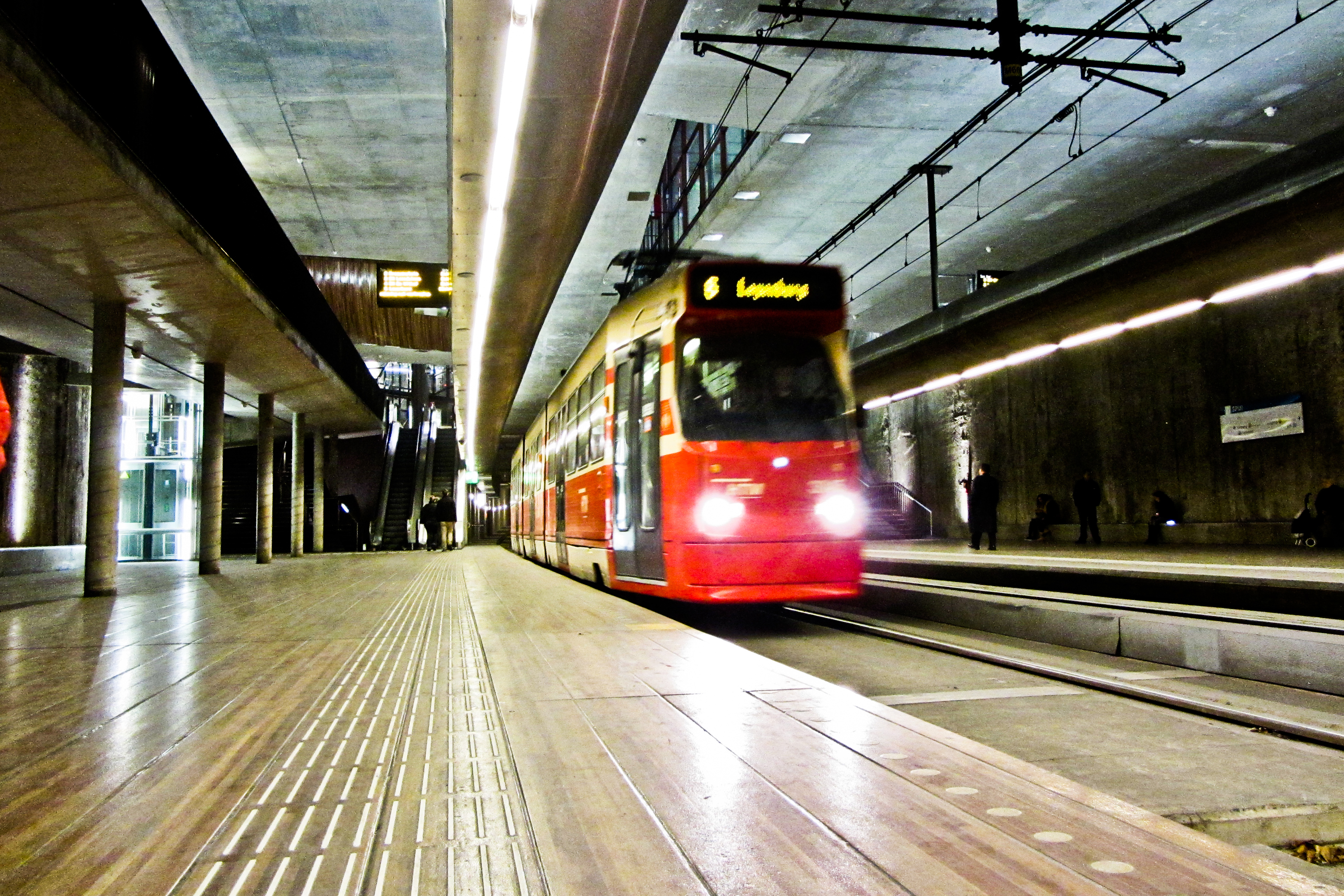
Tramtunnel with wooden platforms

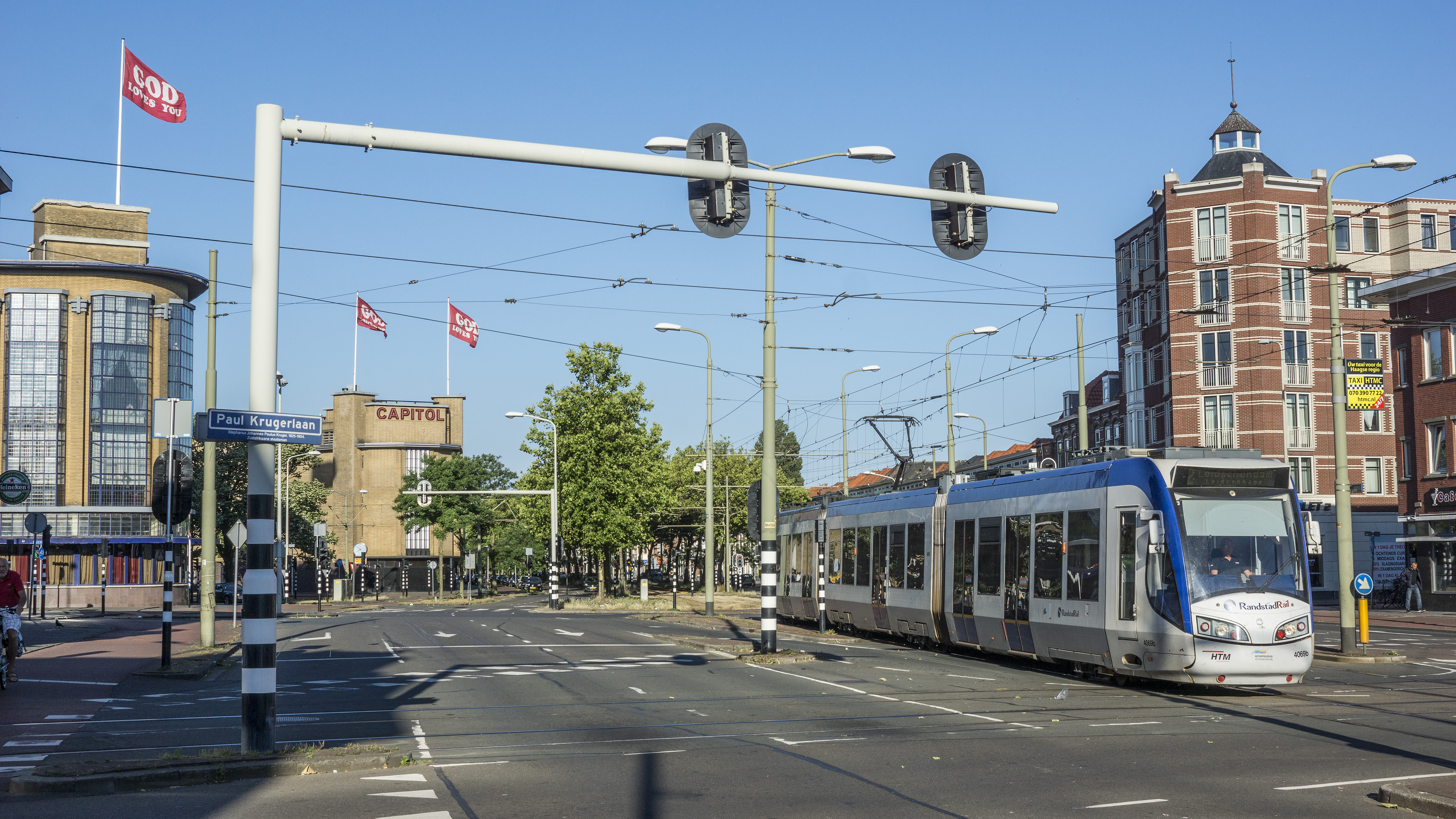
Tram at Paul Krugerlaan

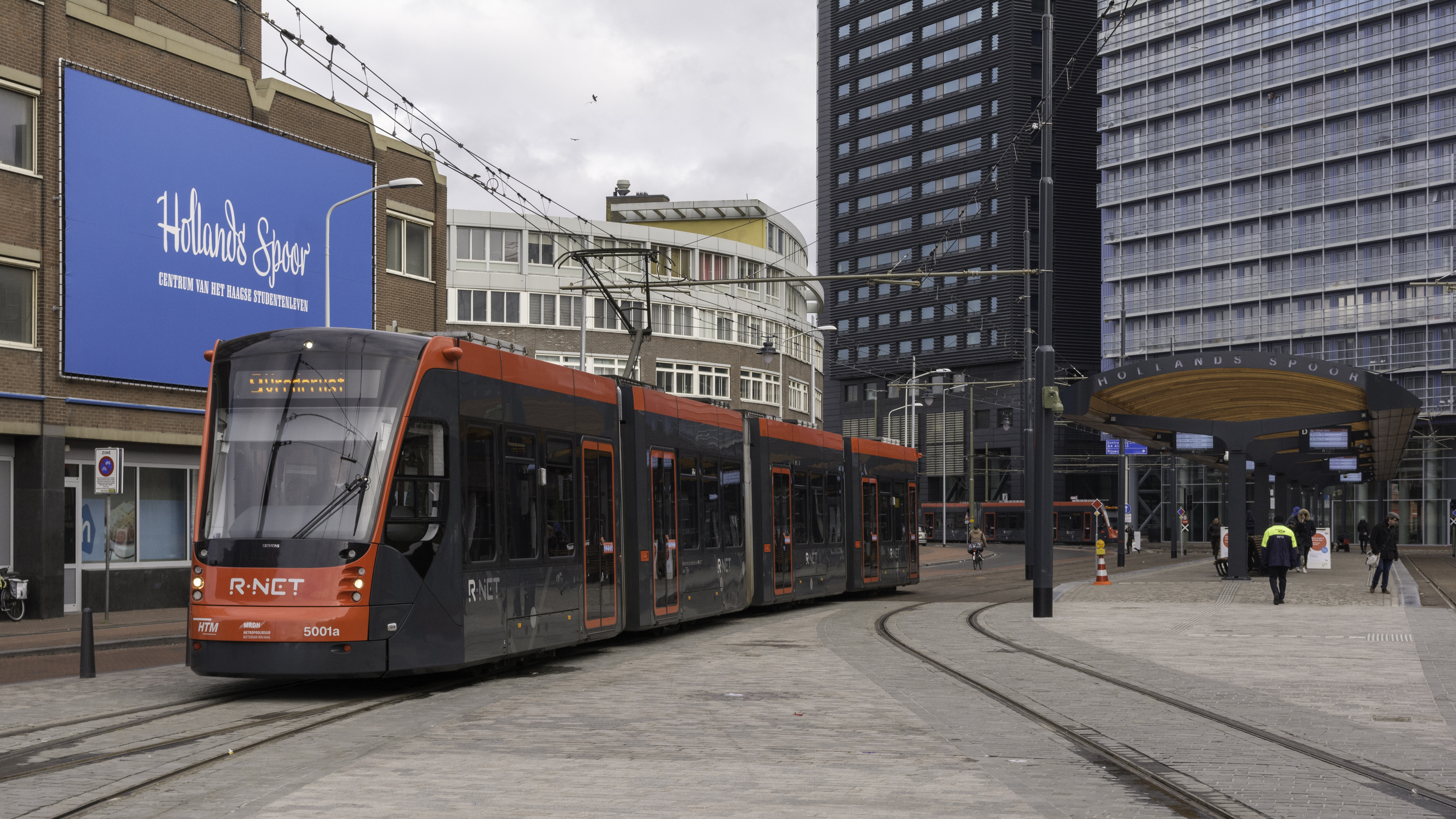
Tram stop at HS railway station

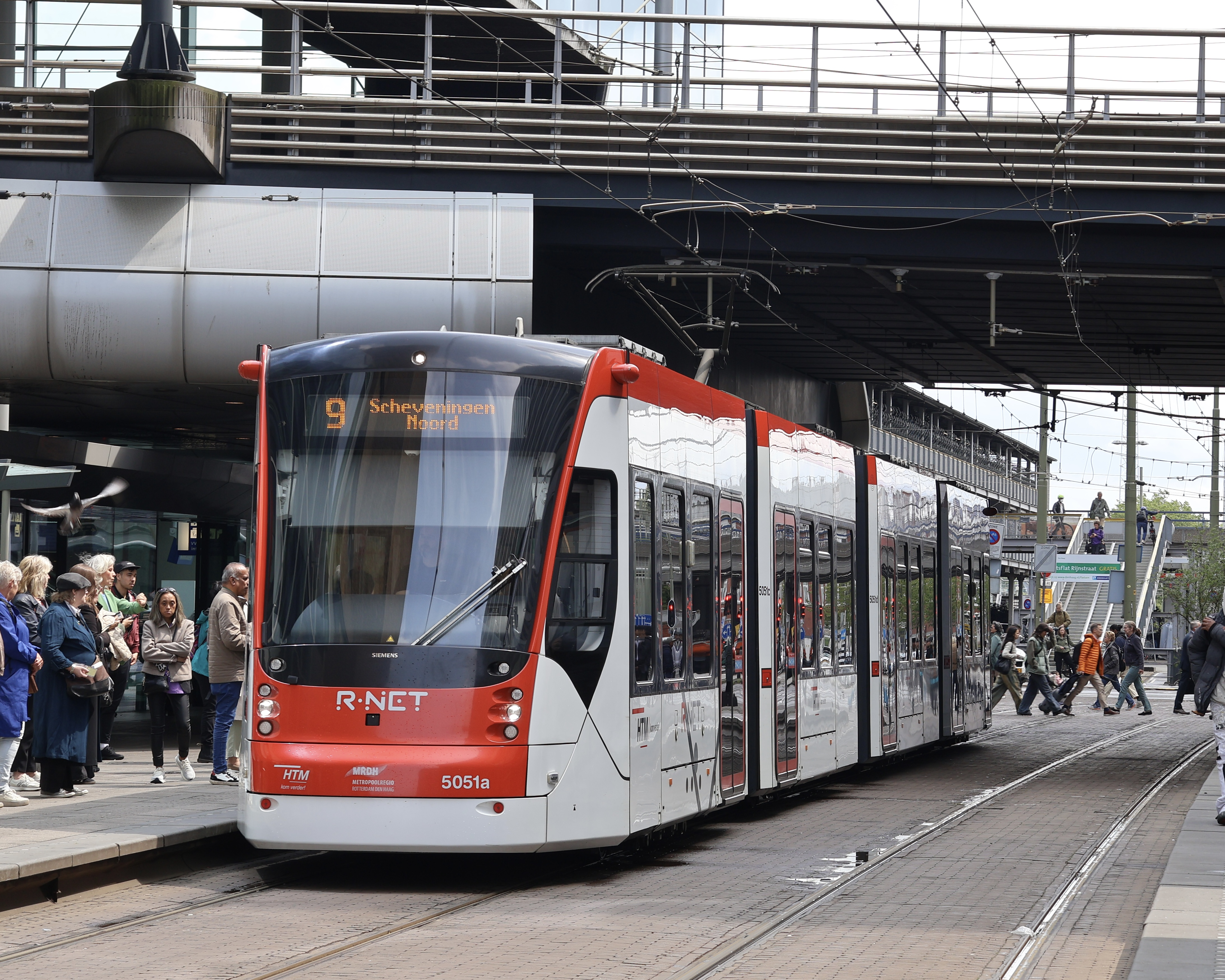
Ground-level tram stop at Den Haag Central station

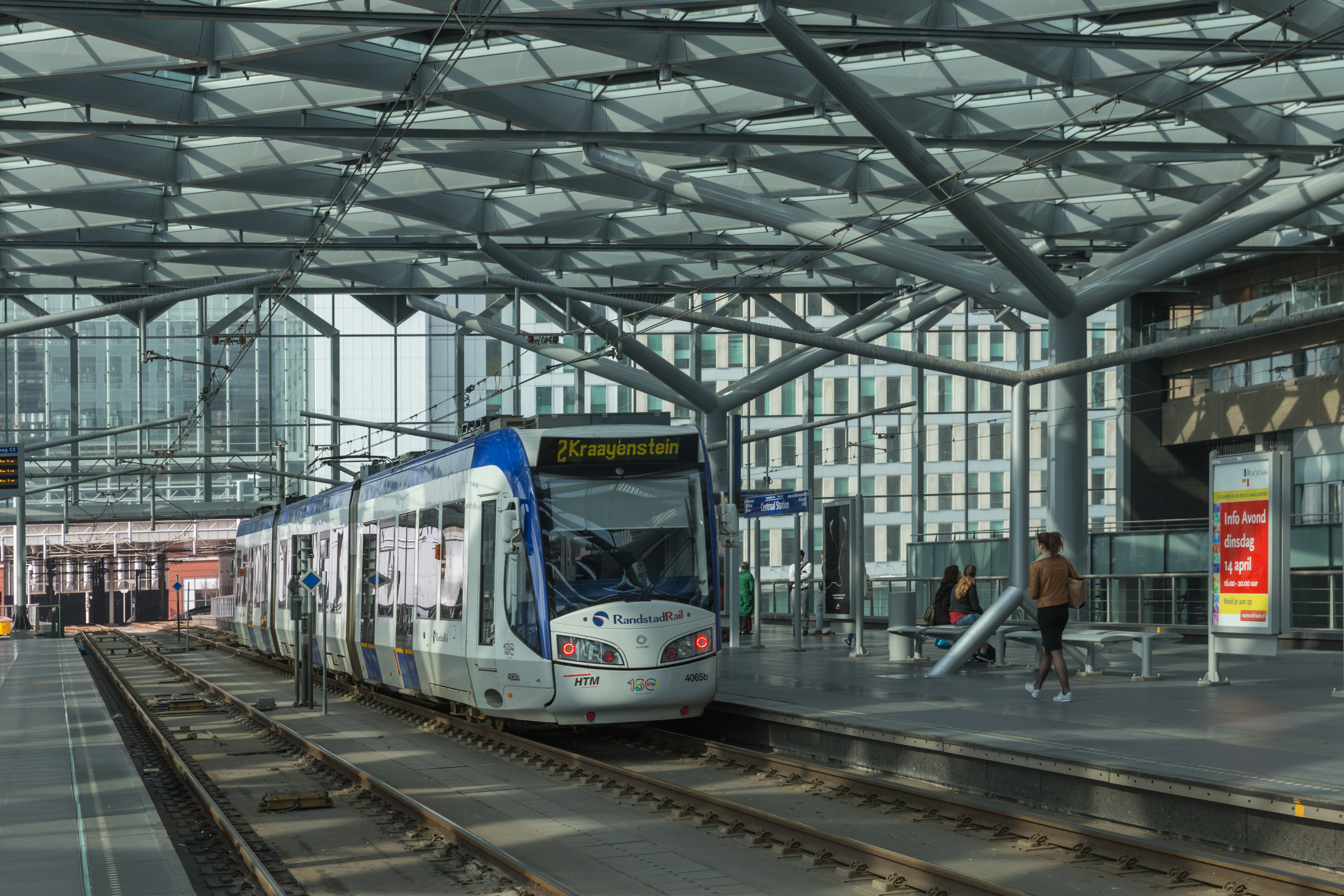
Upper-level tram stop at Den Haag Central station

== See also ==
- List of town tramway systems in the Netherlands
- HTM Personenvervoer
