= Rein Jansma =

Dutch architect (1959–2023)

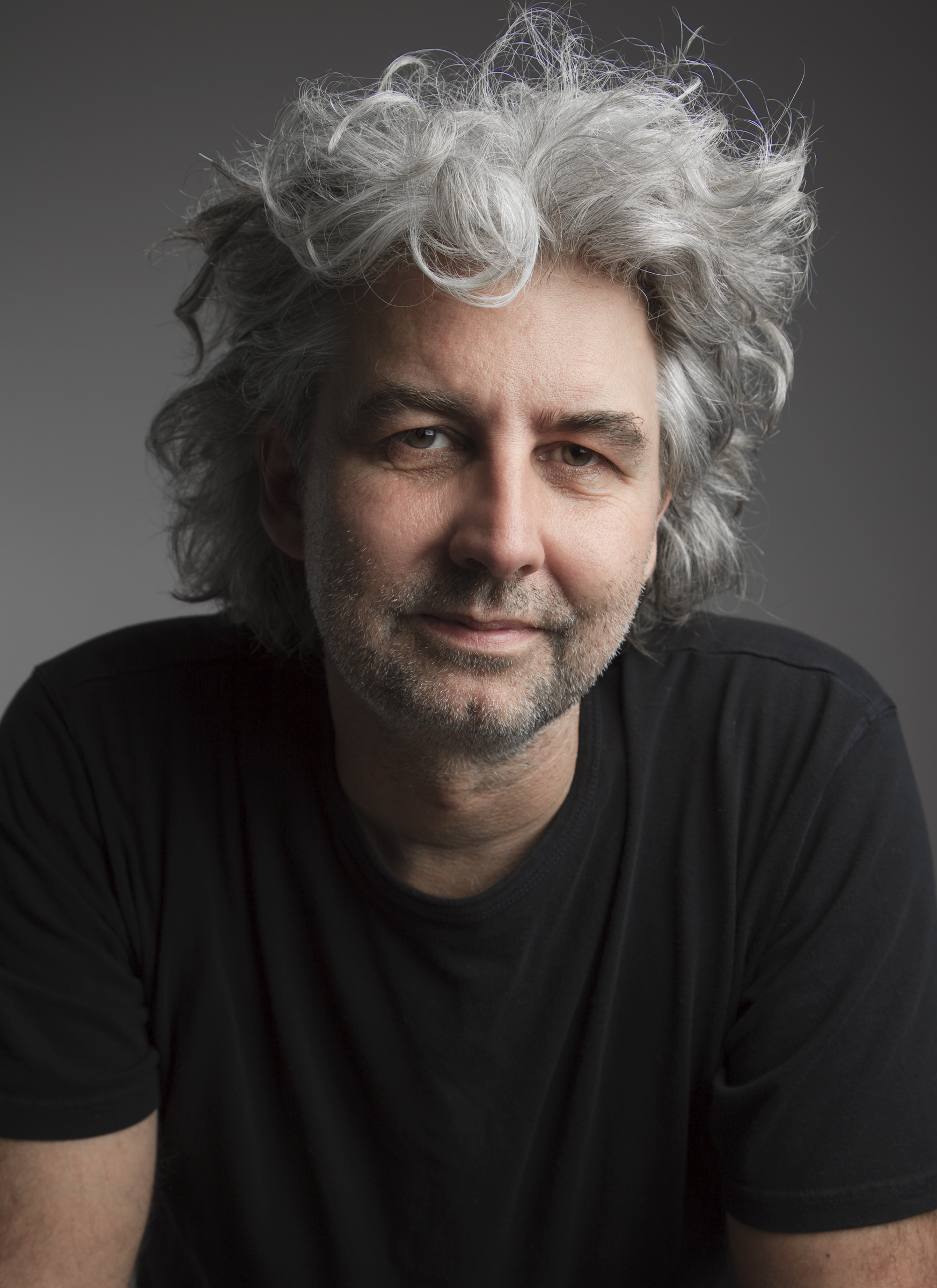

Rein Jansma (28 September 1959 – 17 April 2023) was a Dutch architect and co-founder of the architectural studio ZJA.

== Early life and education ==
Jansma was born on 28 September 1959 in an artistic environment to parents that were interested in both art and science and were politically active, artistic family. His father Arie Jansma was a visual artist, who once exhibited at the Stedelijk Museum Amsterdam and his mother was a mathematician named Jeanne Nancy ('Oekie') van Dulm. Renowned Dutch designers and artists like Wim Crouwel, Benno Premsela, Dick Elffers, and Cas Oorthuys were regular guests at their house and influenced Rein Jansma's upbringing.

Jansma met Moshé Zwarts as a teenager, because Zwarts was a good friend of his parents. Zwarts recognised in Jansma a "brilliant boy" and a "true autodidact".

Jansma briefly enrolled in studies in biology as well as architecture at Delft University of Technology but finished neither.

== Career ==
Jansma was drawn to "making things" and following his own diverse interests. This included the publication of Stairs in 1981, a pop-up book with compositions of simple cut-outs of folded stairs and no text. It gained international acclaim for its architectural elegance and has been reprinted several times since. The publication is included in several museum collections, such as Stedelijk Museum Amsterdam the Fine Arts Museums of San Francisco. Jansma was also briefly involved in set design in Paris and Amsterdam.

At the end of the 1980s, Jansma started collaborating with Zwarts. After the duo won several architectural design competitions, they decided to start an architectural studio together in 1990, now known as ZJA (formerly Zwarts & Jansma Architects). The studio quickly gained success and over the years has taken on a wide variety of projects, with an emphasis on public infrastructure and technical innovation. Jansma received his title as architect based on his extensive experience and portfolio of projects at ZJA. Jansma's approach to architecture is characterised by curiosity and exploration, a fascination for physics and the natural world as well as a love of art and a keen sense of technological possibility.

Jansma was married to Maartje Nevejan. He died on 17 April 2023, at the age of 63.

== Bibliography ==
- Jansma, Rein (1999). Stairs. ISBN 1-55670-963-3. OCLC 44261369.
- Ibelings, Hans (2003). Zwarts & Jansma Architecten 1990-2003. Rotterdam: NAi Publishers. ISBN 90-5662-303-6. OCLC 53155137.
