= Netkous =

Tram bridge in The Hague

Coordinates: 52°4′49.14″N 4°20′4.5″E

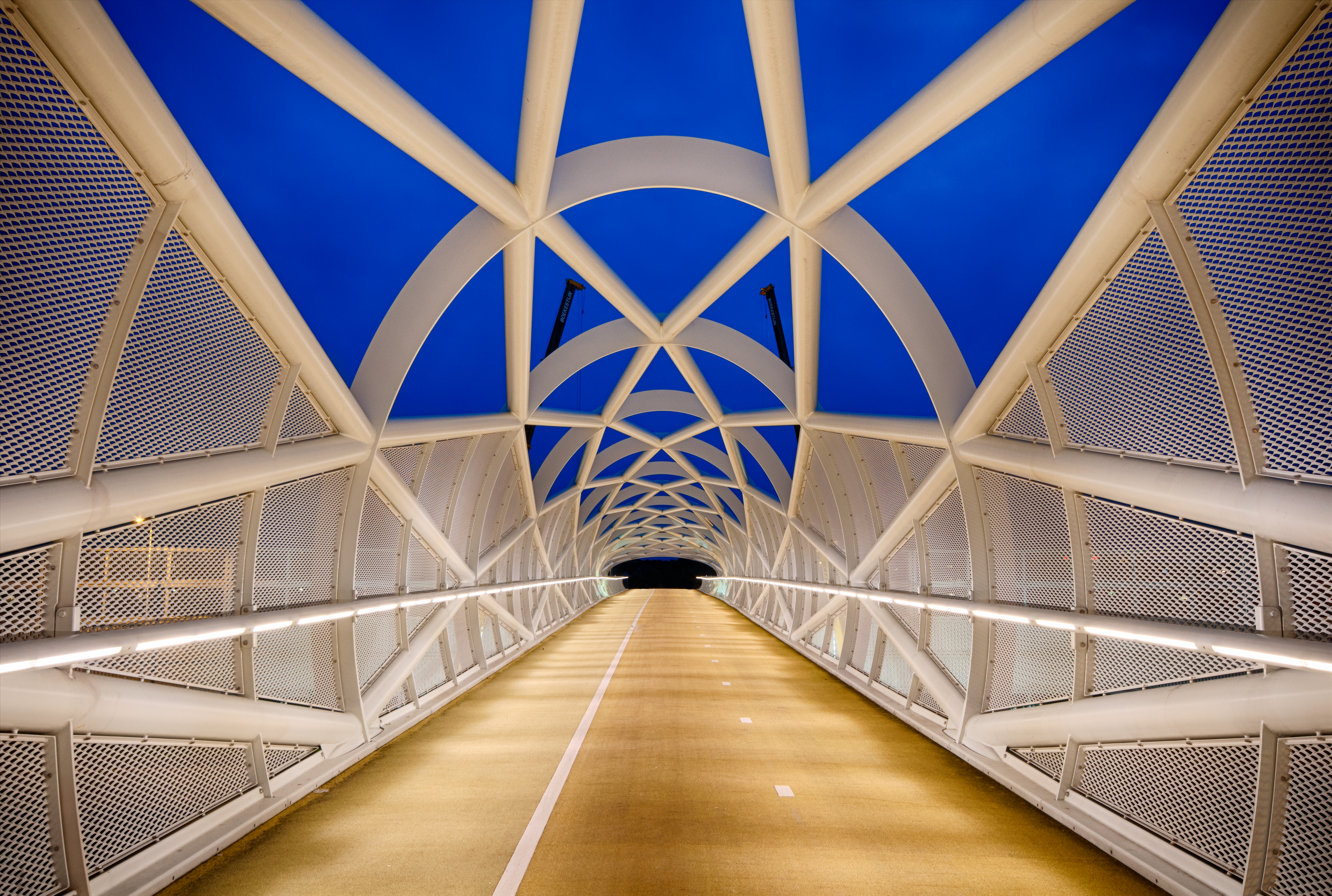
Netkous during blue hour

The Netkous or Fishnets is the popular name for the tram bridge in The Hague district Bezuidenhout built between 2004 and 2006. The viaduct is along the Prinses Beatrixlaan.

An important part of light rail is the coupling of the Hague tram to the Zoetermeer City Line (formerly part of the NS). To make this possible, it was decided to build a branch of the Hague tram elevated between Ternoot to the railway station Laan van NOI, where it connects to the existing line. In the business area Beatrixkwartier to improve access, a station was built halfway along the viaduct.

Before construction could begin the first station Ternoot was moved a few hundred meters, otherwise, there would be no room for the curve CS Beatrixlaan.

Both the viaduct and the integrated station were designed by Zwarts & Jansma Architects. The overpass is built up of an open tubular structure, which is reminiscent of a fishnet stocking. Due to this strong construction are relatively large spans possible and the number of columns can remain limited. The viaduct segments are assembled on site, prefabricated steel rings and tubes. To do this, a temporary assembly was built on the route. In a special conserving hall (composed of shipping containers) the viaduct parts were provided with a protective coating.

The viaduct is ridden by RandstadRail lines 3 and 4.

A similar fishnet structure applied in 2014 at the Railway bridge over the Dieze and The Royal Welsh Bridge in 's-Hertogenbosch, and is applied to the complete 2016 terminal of the Rotterdam metro line E between Slinge and The Hague Central.

== Photo gallery ==
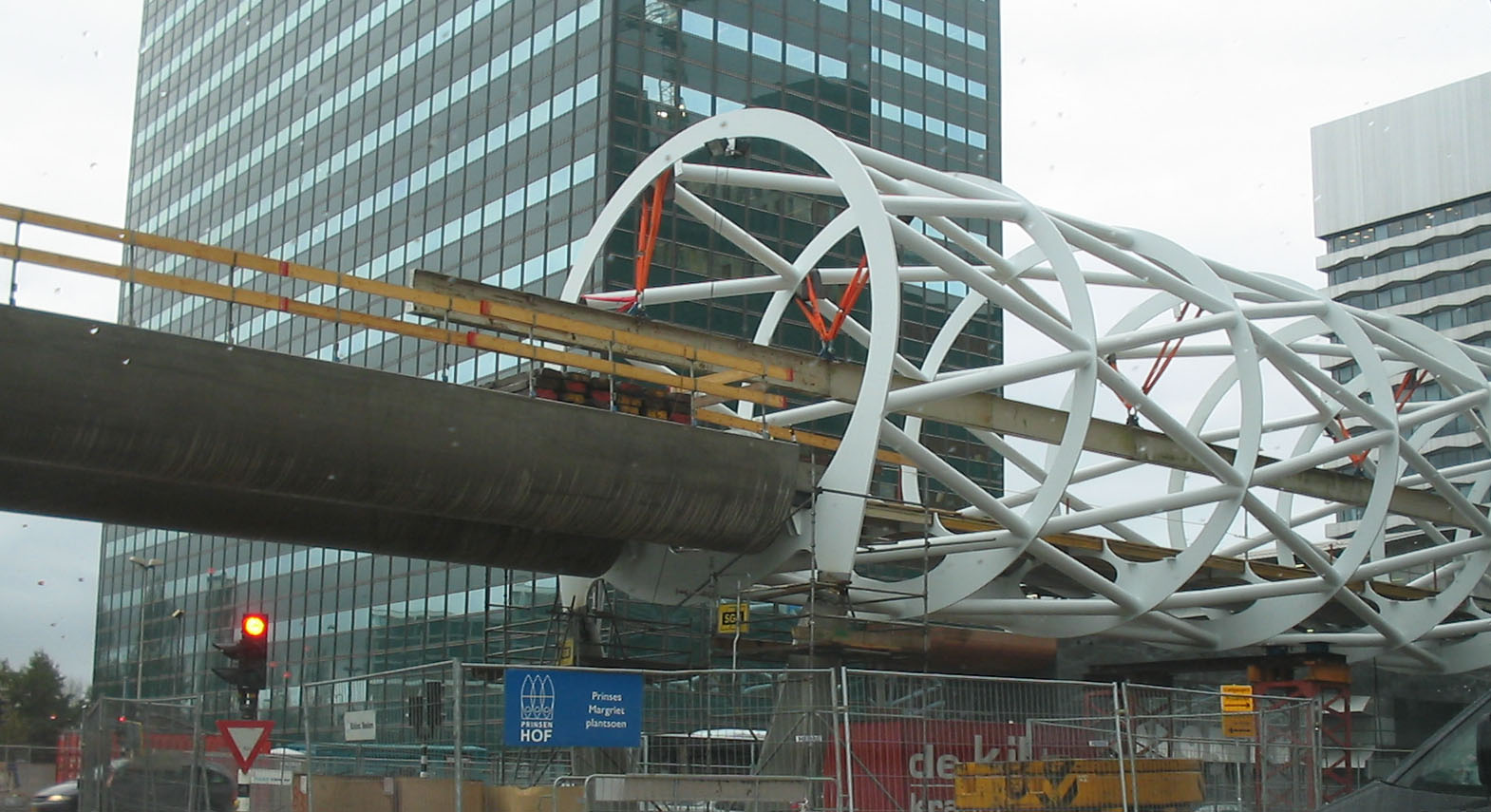
The Netkous under construction.

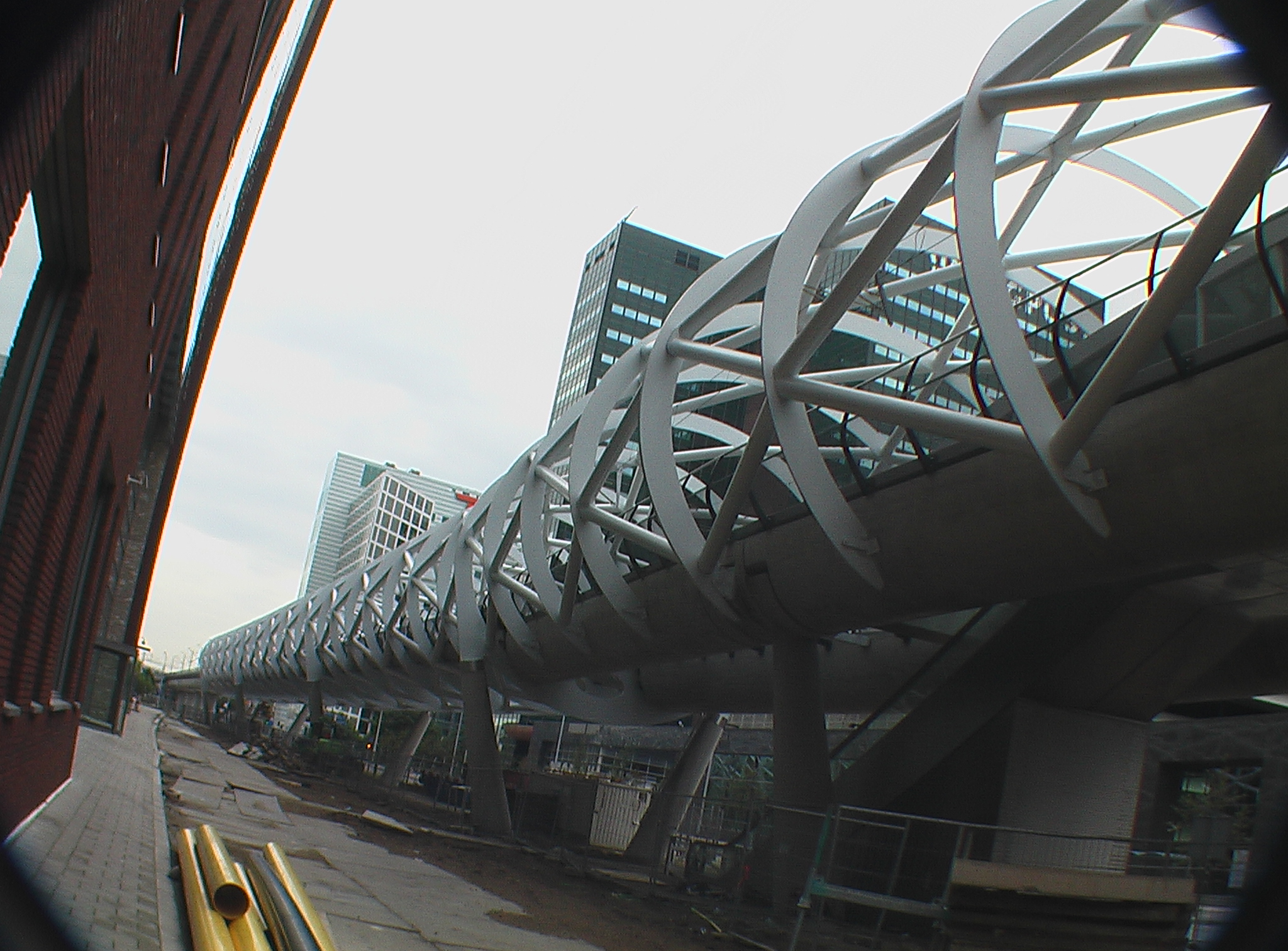
The Netkous under construction.

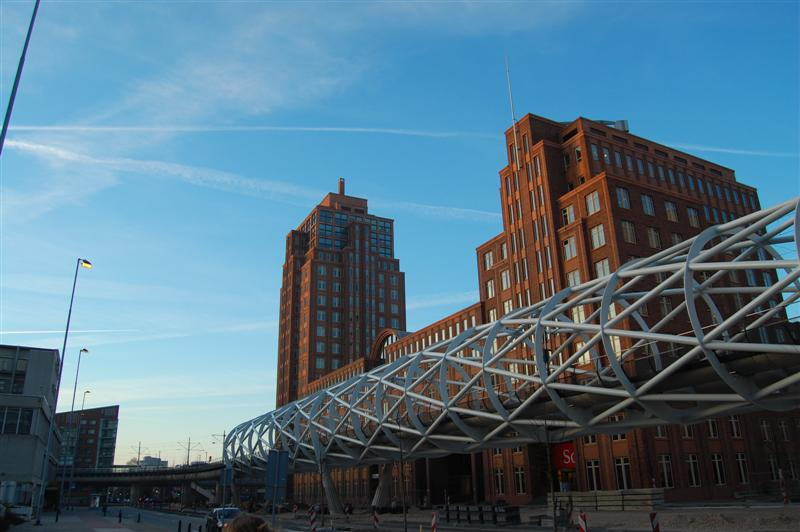
The Netkous - April 2007.

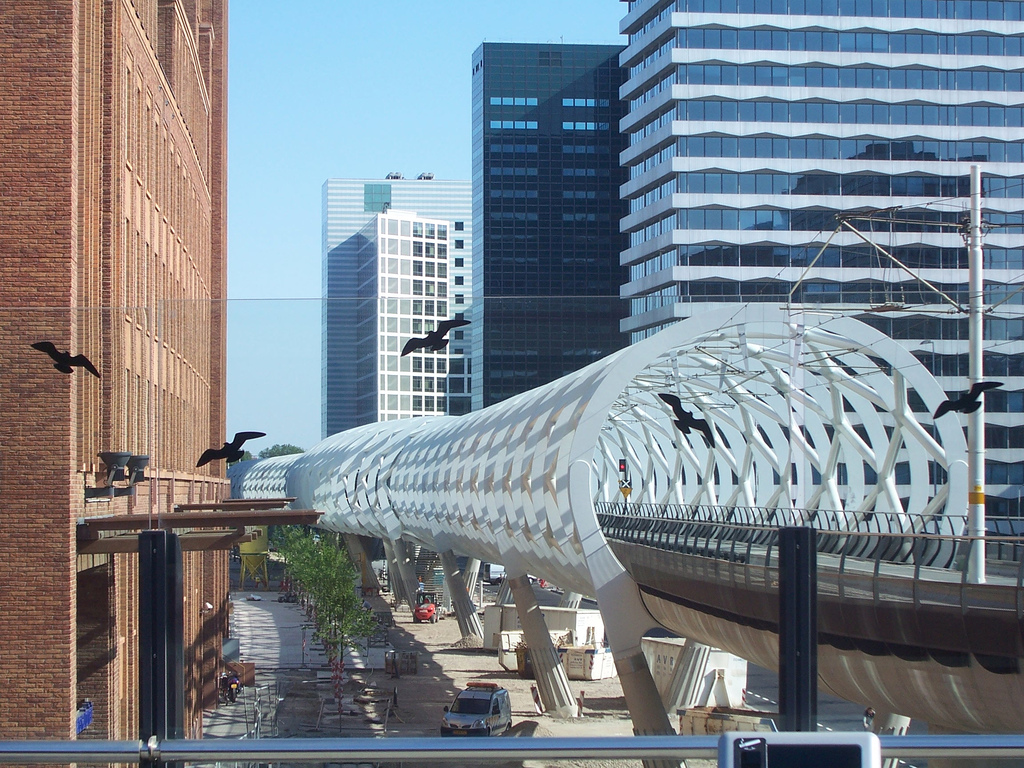
The Netkous - June 2007.

== See also ==
- Light rail
