= Zoetermeer Stadslijn =

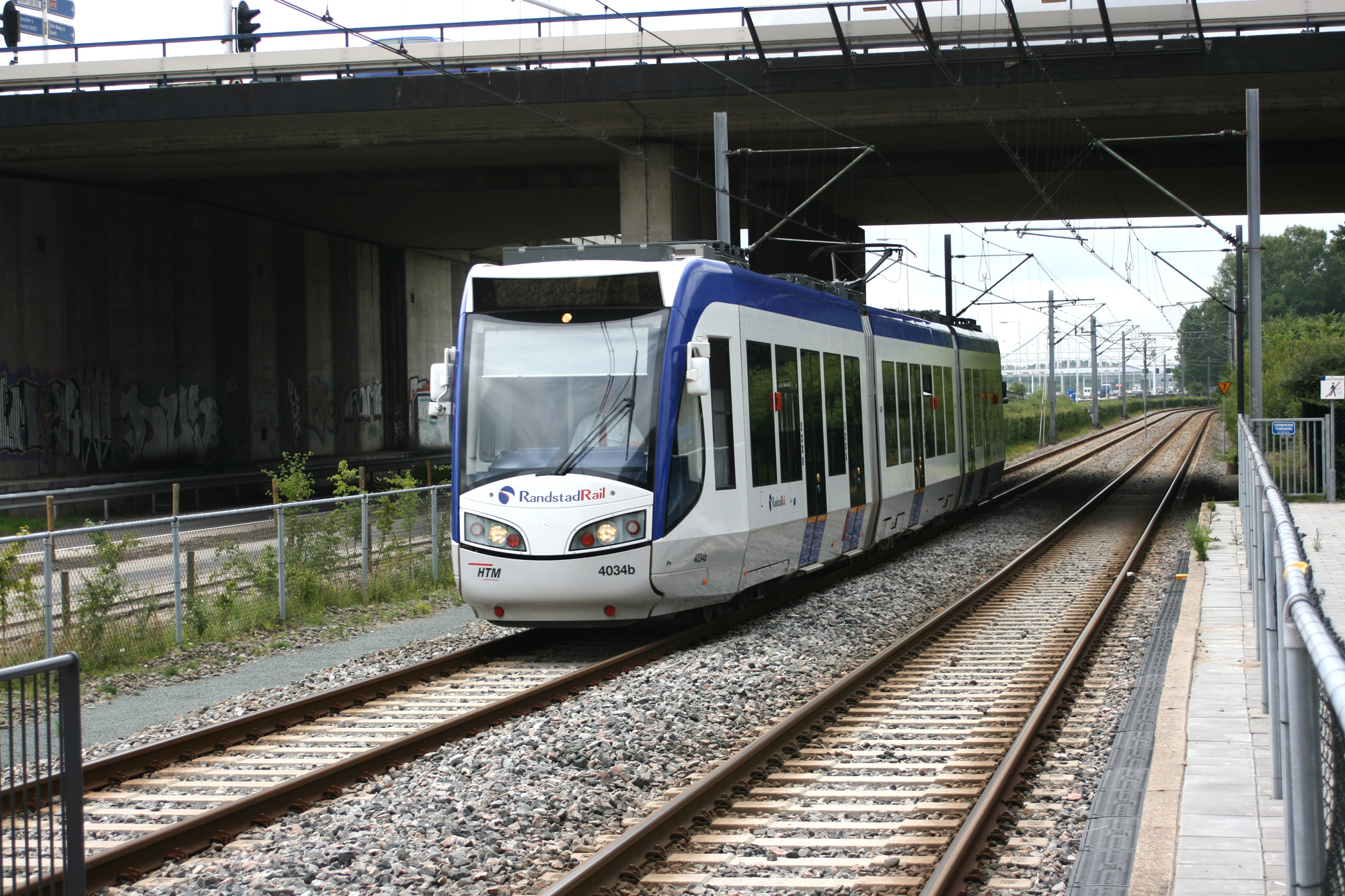
A Randstadrail Tram on line 3

Zoetermeer Stadslijn is a light-rail line converted from a former commuter rail line in the Netherlands, between The Hague and Zoetermeer.

== History ==
Originally, the line was managed by the Dutch Railways (NS). Since June 2006, it has served as a light-rail line, using trams. The light-rail connection, combined with The Hague-Rotterdam line, is called the RandstadRail.

After the Oosterheem neighbourhood was built in Zoetermeer, an extra track was added. It does not take the round line, unlike the other routes, but splits between Seghweart and Leidsewallen stations.

== Lines ==
Since the extra Oosterheem line was added, two lines reach the Zoetermeer Stadslijn and are called line 3 and line 4. Line 3 uses the older track, and line 4, or the Oosterheem line, takes the newer track. In 2020 a new line 34 was added combining the routes of line 3 in The Hague and that of line 4 in Zoetermeer.

=== Line 3 ===
Line 3 takes the old track and makes a lap. At Centrum West, it turns and circles back over the whole track to Den Haag Centraal Station.

==== Route ====
The route starts at Den Haag, passes through Voorburg and Leidschendam, and continues through Den Haag Leidschenveen, at the following stops:

- Den Haag CS
- Beatrixkwartier
- Laan van NOI
- Voorburg 't Loo
- Leidschendam-Voorburg
- Forepark
- Leidschenveen

Then, it enters Zoetermeer at station Voorweg Laag. In Zoetermeer has the following stops:

- Voorweg Laag
- Centrum West
- Stadhuis
- Palenstein
- Seghwaert
- Leidsewallen
- De Leyens
- Buytenwegh
- Voorweg Hoog
- Meerzicht
- Driemanspolder (NS station Zoetermeer)
- Delftsewallen
- Dorp
- Centrum West

At the end of the route, the vehicle turns around and drives the route back to Den Haag.

=== Line 4 ===
Line 4 takes the same route as line 3 until Seghwaert, where it splits and goes into the Oosterheem neighbourhood.

=== Route ===
The route starts at Den Haag and goes through Voorburg and Leidschendam and Den Haag again, just like line 3. In Zoetermeer it has the following stations:

- Voorweg Laag
- Centrum West
- Stadhuis
- Palenstein
- Seghwaert
- Willem Dreeslaan
- Oosterheem
- Javalaan
- Van Tuyllpark
- Lansingerland-Zoetermeer

That is the end of the track.

=== Line 34 ===
On this part of the route the stops are identical to that of line 4
