= Centrum-West RandstadRail station =

Railway station in the Netherlands

Centrum-West
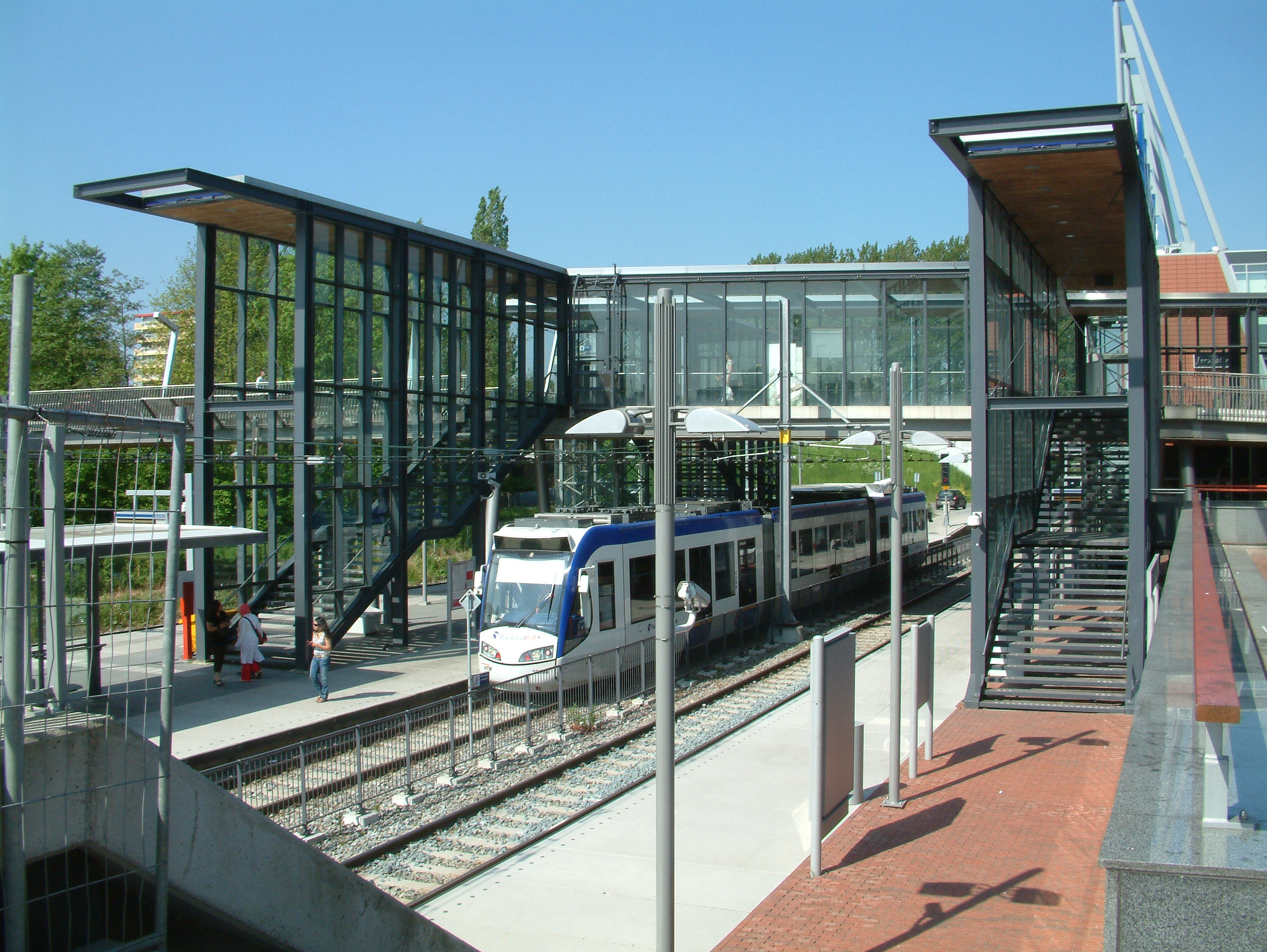
- The refurbished station. Platform 1 for Den Haag, Platform 2 for Zoetermeer (towards Stadhuis), Platform 3 for Zoetermeer (towards Dorp).

General information
- Location: Netherlands
- Coordinates: 52°3′38″N 4°29′01″E
- Platforms: 4

History
- Opened: 22 May 1977; 49 years ago, reopened 29 October 2006; 19 years ago
- Closed: 3 June 2006; 20 years ago
Location
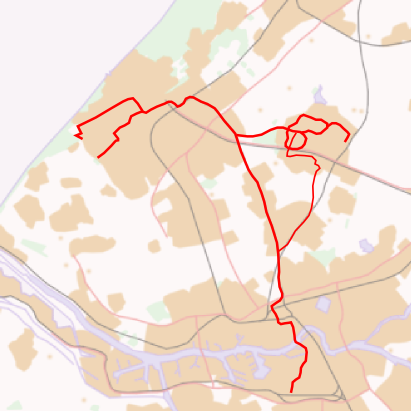
- Location within RandstadRail network

Centrum-West is a RandstadRail station in Zoetermeer, the Netherlands.

== History ==
The station opened, as a railway station, on 22 May 1977 as part of the Zoetermeerlijn, operating Zoetermeer Stadslijn services. The train station closed on 3 June 2006 and reopened as a RandstadRail station on 29 October 2006 for the HTM tram services (4), and on 20 October 2007 for tram service 3.

The reopened station featured three platforms. These platforms are low and the same level as the tram doors. There is a terminating platform for RR3 services starting at Centrum-West towards Dorp, and two through platforms for westbound services towards Voorweg and Den Haag, and eastbound services towards Stadhuis. An additional terminating platform was later added.

Passengers from Den Haag can change at this station for Dorp, Delftsewallen and Driemanspolder and vice versa, to get there quicker.

The Dutch television programme Opsporing Verzocht (Wanted) of 8 November 2023 aired surveillance camera images and requested tips to identify two persons who assaulted a train driver on Centrum-West station on 2 November 2023.

== Train services ==
The following services currently call at Centrum-West:

Service	Route	Material	Frequency
RR3	Arnold Spoelplein - Pisuissestraat - Mozartlaan - Heliotrooplaan - Muurbloemweg - Hoefbladlaan - De Savornin Lohmanplein - Appelstraat - Zonnebloemstraat - Azaleaplein - Goudenregenstraat - Fahrenheitstraat - Valkenbosplein - Conradkade - Van Speijkstraat - Elandstraat - MCH Westeinde - Brouwersgracht - Grote Markt - Spui - Den Haag Centraal - Beatrixkwartier - Laan van NOI - Voorburg 't Loo - Leidschendam-Voorburg - Forepark - Leidschenveen - Voorweg (Low Level) - Centrum-West - Stadhuis - Palenstein - Seghwaert - Leidsewallen - De Leyens - Buytenwegh - Voorweg (High Level) - Meerzicht - Driemanspolder - Delftsewallen - Dorp - Centrum-West	HTM RegioCidatis Tram	6x per hour (Monday - Saturday, Every 10 Minutes), 5x per hour (Sundays, Every 12 Minutes), 4x per hour (Evenings, after 8pm, Every 15 Minutes)
RR4	De Uithof - Beresteinaan - Bouwlustlaan - De Rade - Dedemsvaart - Zuidwoldepad - Leyenburg - Monnickendamplein - Tienhovenselaan - Dierenselaan - De La Reyweg - Monstersestraat - MCH Westeinde - Brouwersgracht - Grote Markt - Spui - Den Haag Centraal - Beatrixkwartier - Laan van NOI - Voorburg 't Loo - Leidschendam-Voorburg - Forepark - Leidschenveen - Voorweg (Low Level) - Centrum-West - Stadhuis - Palenstein - Seghwaert - Willem Dreeslaan - Oosterheem - Javalaan	HTM RegioCitadis Tram	6x per hour (Monday - Saturday, Every 10 Minutes), 5x per hour (Sundays, Every 12 Minutes), 4x per hour (Evenings, after 8pm, Every 15 Minutes)

RR3 starts at Centrum-West, operates around the Zoetermeer Circuit, then passes Centrum-West again and finally continues to Den Haag.

Preceding station	RandstadRail	Following station
Stadhuis towards Centrum-West	Line 3 (HTM)	Voorweg towards Arnold Spoelplein
Terminus	Line 3 (HTM)	Dorp towards Arnold Spoelplein
Stadhuis towards Lansingerland-Zoetermeer	Line 4 (HTM)	Voorweg towards De Uithof

== Bus services ==
A bus station is next to the station (connected by the footbridge). The following services serve the bus station:

- 32 (Centrum-West - Stompwijk - Zoeterwoude-Dorp - Leiden Lammenschans - Leiden Cenraal - Katwijk aan Zee) - Connexxion)
- 50 (Centrum-West - Driemanspolder RR - Rijswijk NS) - Veolia
- 54 (Centrum-West - Driemanspolder RR - Den Haag HS/Hoge School) - Veolia
- 70 (Centrum-West - Zoetermeer Hospital - Zoetermeer Noordhove - Zoetermeer Hospital - Centrum-West) - Veolia
- 71 (Centrum-West - Zoetermeer NS - Zoetermeer Rokkeveen West - Zoetermeer Rokkeveen Oost - Zoetermeer Oost NS - Centrum-West) - Veolia
- 72 (Centrum-West - Zoetermeer Oost NS - Zoetermeer Rokkeveen Oost - Zoetermeer Rokkeveen Oost - Zoetermeer NS - Centrum-West) - Veolia
- 74 (Centrum-West - Zoetermeer Oost NS - Zoetermeer Lansinghage - Centrum-West) - Veolia
- 77 (Centrum-West - Voorweg RR - Meerzicht RR - Driemanspolder RR - Dorp RR - Zoetermeer Hoornerhage - Zoetermeer Oosterheem) - Veolia
- 121 (Centrum-West - Zoetermeer NS - Pijnacker Centrum - Delft University - Delft NS) - Veolia
- 165 (Centrum-West - Palenstein RR - Willem Dreeslaan RR - Benthuizen - Hazerwoude - Hazerwoude Rijndijk - Alphen a/d Rijn NS) - Connexxion
- 170 (Centrum-West - Delftsewallen RR - Zoetermeer Oost NS - Zoetermeer NS - Berkel - Rotterdam Noord NS - Rotterdam Centraal NS) - Qbuzz
- 173 (Centrum-West - Zoetermeer Hoornerhage - Bleiswijk - Bergschenhoek - Rotterdam Noord NS - Rotterdam Centraal NS) - Qbuzz
- 177 (Centrum-West - Zoetermeer Hoornerhage - Moerkapelle - Waddinxveen South - Gouda NS) - Connexxion
- 204 (Centrum-West - Zoetermeer NS - Zoetermeer Oost NS - Lansinghage - Bergschenhoek - Rotterdam Centraal NS) - Qbuzz (Fastbus)
- 206 (Centrum-West - Zoeterwoude-Dorp - Leiden Lammenschans - Leiden Centraal) - Connexxion

== Gallery ==
RandstadRail Network Map

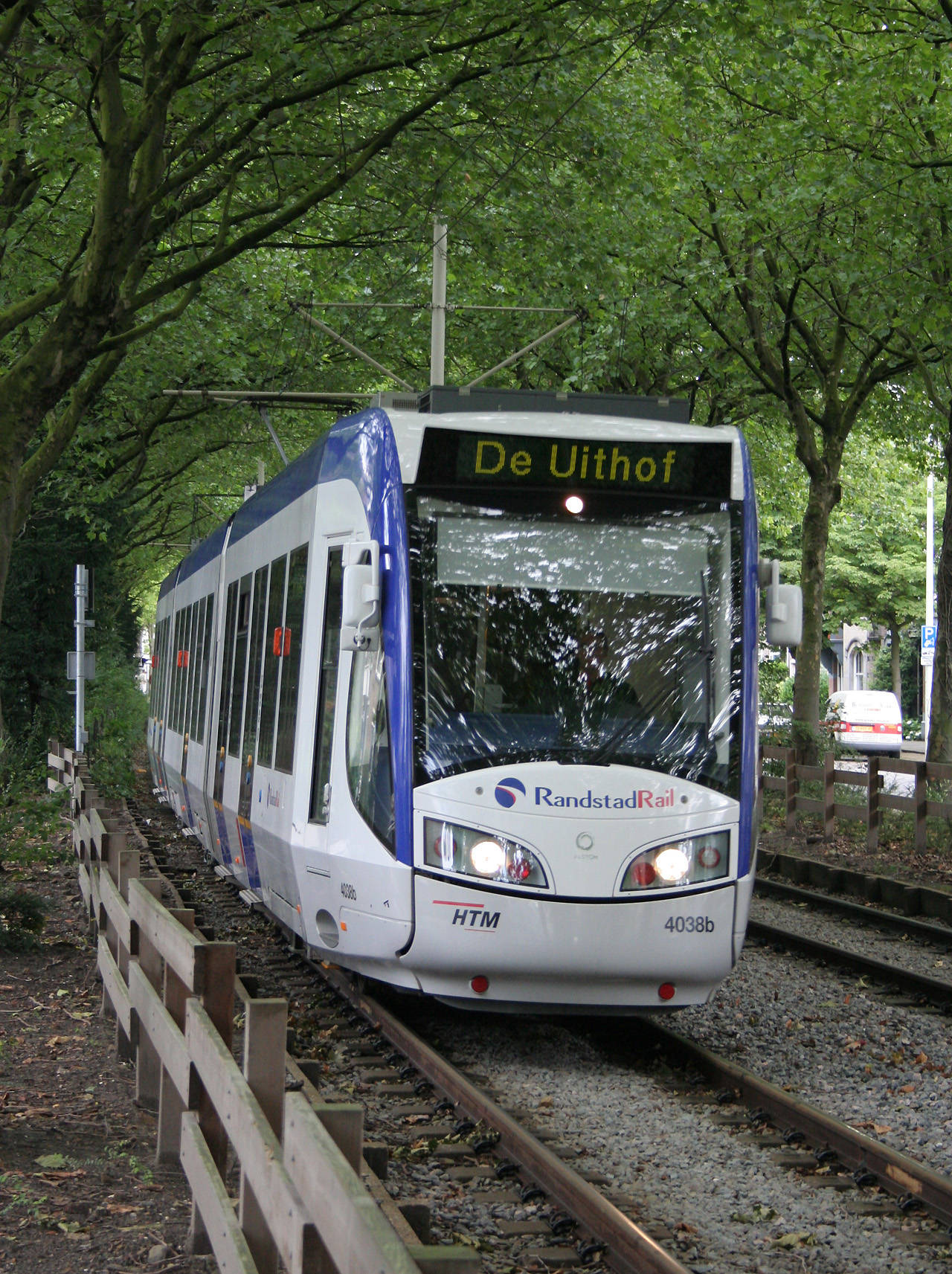
A RegioCitadis on RR4

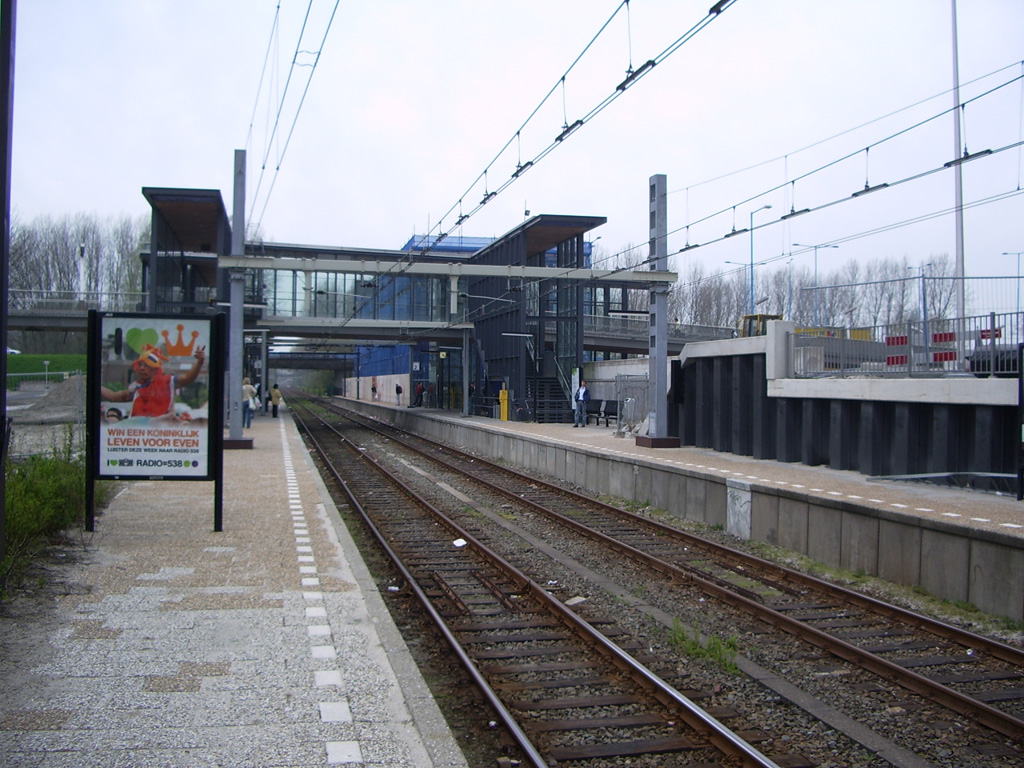
The station before it was closed for refurbishing.
