= De Leyens RandstadRail station =

RandstadRail station in Zoetermeer

De Leyens
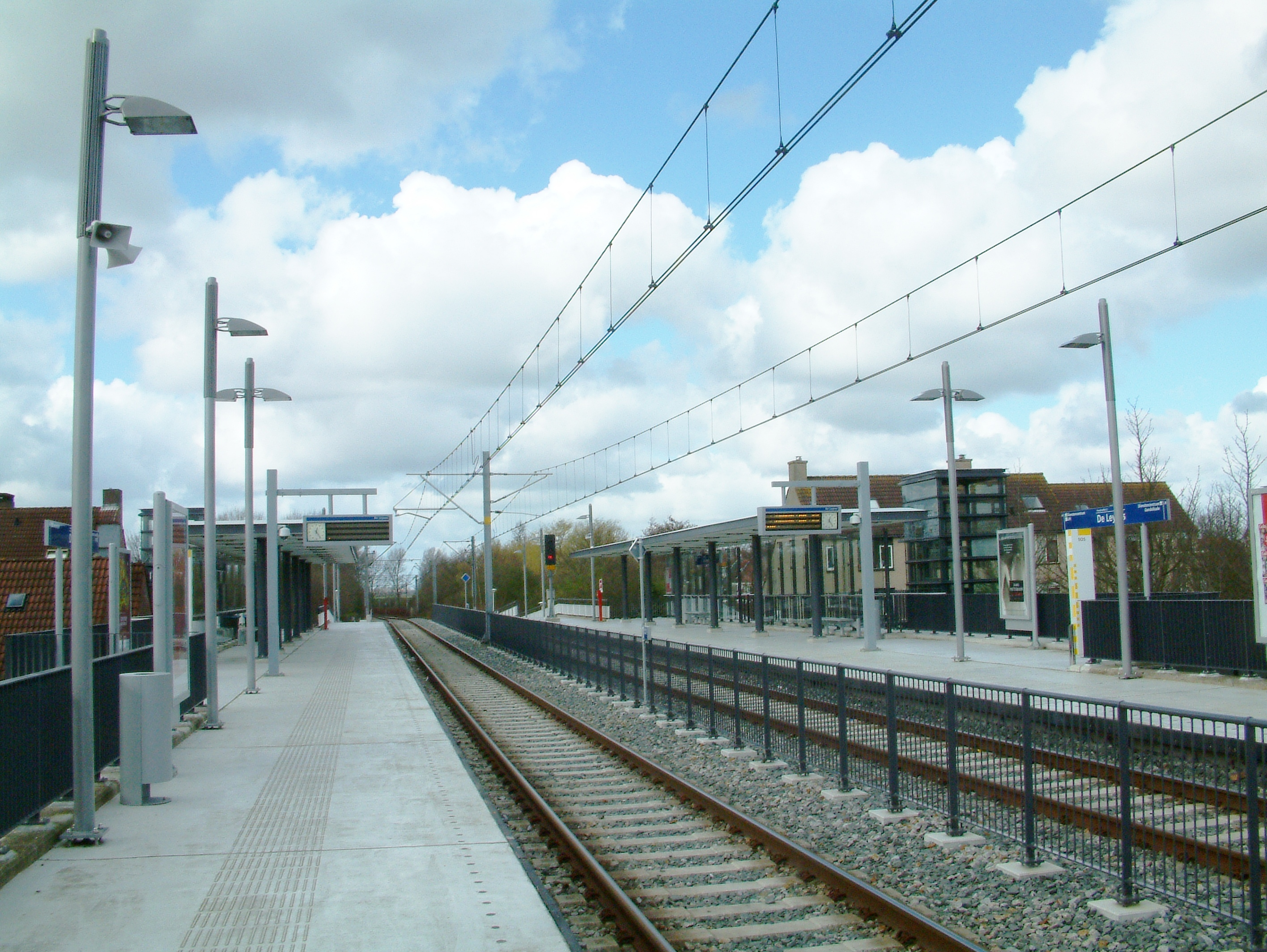

General information
- Location: Netherlands
- Coordinates: 52°04′18″N 4°29′43″E
- Platforms: 2

History
- Opened: 29 September 1979; 46 years ago, reopened 29 October 2006; 19 years ago
- Closed: 3 June 2006; 20 years ago

Services
Preceding station	RandstadRail	Following station
Buytenwegh towards Centrum-West	Line 3 (HTM)	Leidsewallen towards Arnold Spoelplein
Location
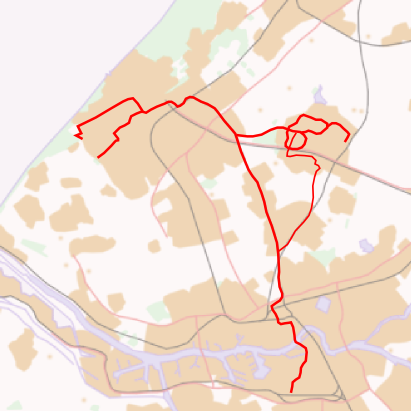
- Location within RandstadRail network

De Leyens is a RandstadRail station in Zoetermeer, the Netherlands.

== History ==
The station opened as a railway station on 29 September 1979 as part of the Zoetermeerlijn, operating Zoetermeer Stadslijn services. It closed on 3 June 2006, and reopened as a RandstadRail station on 29 October 2007.

The station has two platforms. They are at the same level as the doors of the trams that it serves, so that passengers can board and alight without having to negotiate a step.

== Train services ==
The following services currently call at De Leyens:

Service	Route	Material	Frequency
RR3	Arnold Spoelplein - Pisuissestraat - Mozartlaan - Heliotrooplaan - Muurbloemweg - Hoefbladlaan - De Savornin Lohmanplein - Appelstraat - Zonnebloemstraat - Azaleaplein - Goudenregenstraat - Fahrenheitstraat - Valkenbosplein - Conradkade - Van Speijkstraat - Elandstraat - MCH Westeinde - Brouwersgracht - Grote Markt - Spui - Den Haag Centraal - Beatrixkwartier - Laan van NOI - Voorburg 't Loo - Leidschendam-Voorburg - Forepark - Leidschenveen - Voorweg (Low Level) - Centrum West - Stadhuis - Palenstein - Seghwaert - Leidsewallen - De Leyens - Buytenwegh - Voorweg (High Level) - Meerzicht - Driemanspolder - Delftsewallen - Dorp - Centrum West	HTM RegioCidatis Tram	6x per hour (Monday - Saturday, Every 10 Minutes), 5x per hour (Sundays, Every 12 Minutes), 4x per hour (Evenings, after 8pm, Every 15 Minutes)

== Gallery ==
RandstadRail Network Map

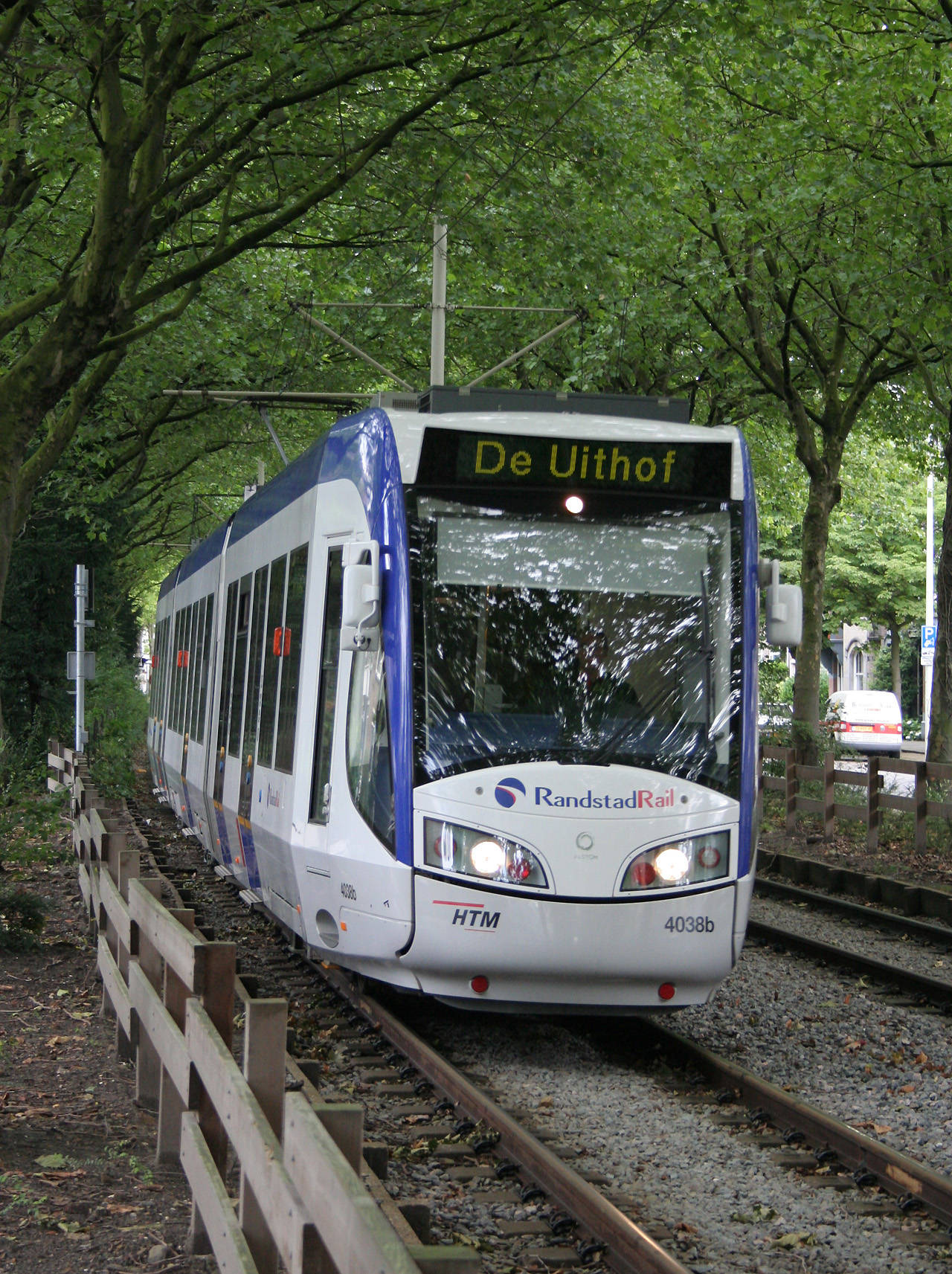
A RegioCitadis on RR4

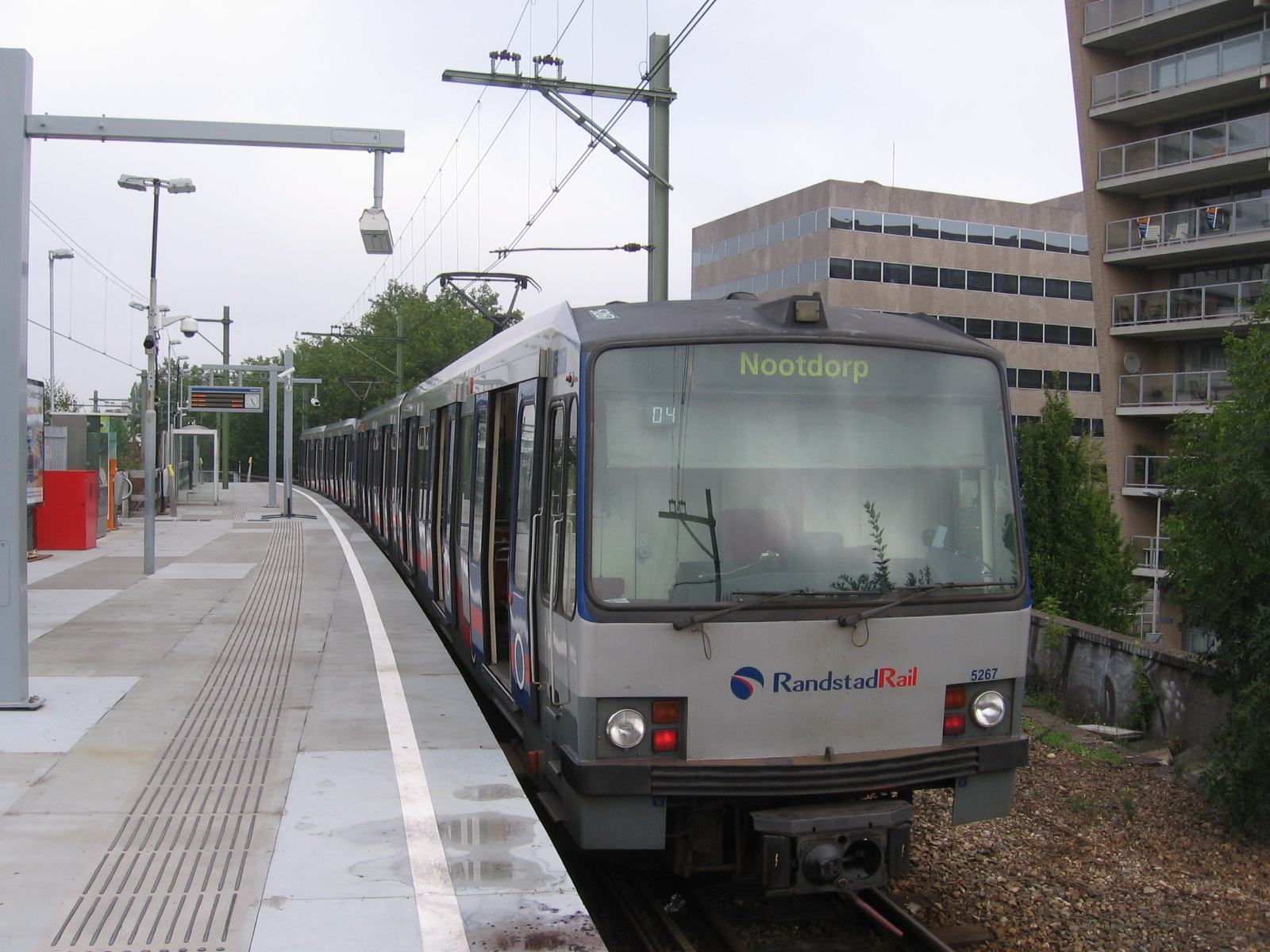
An RET Metro set that was converted for RandstadRail operation.

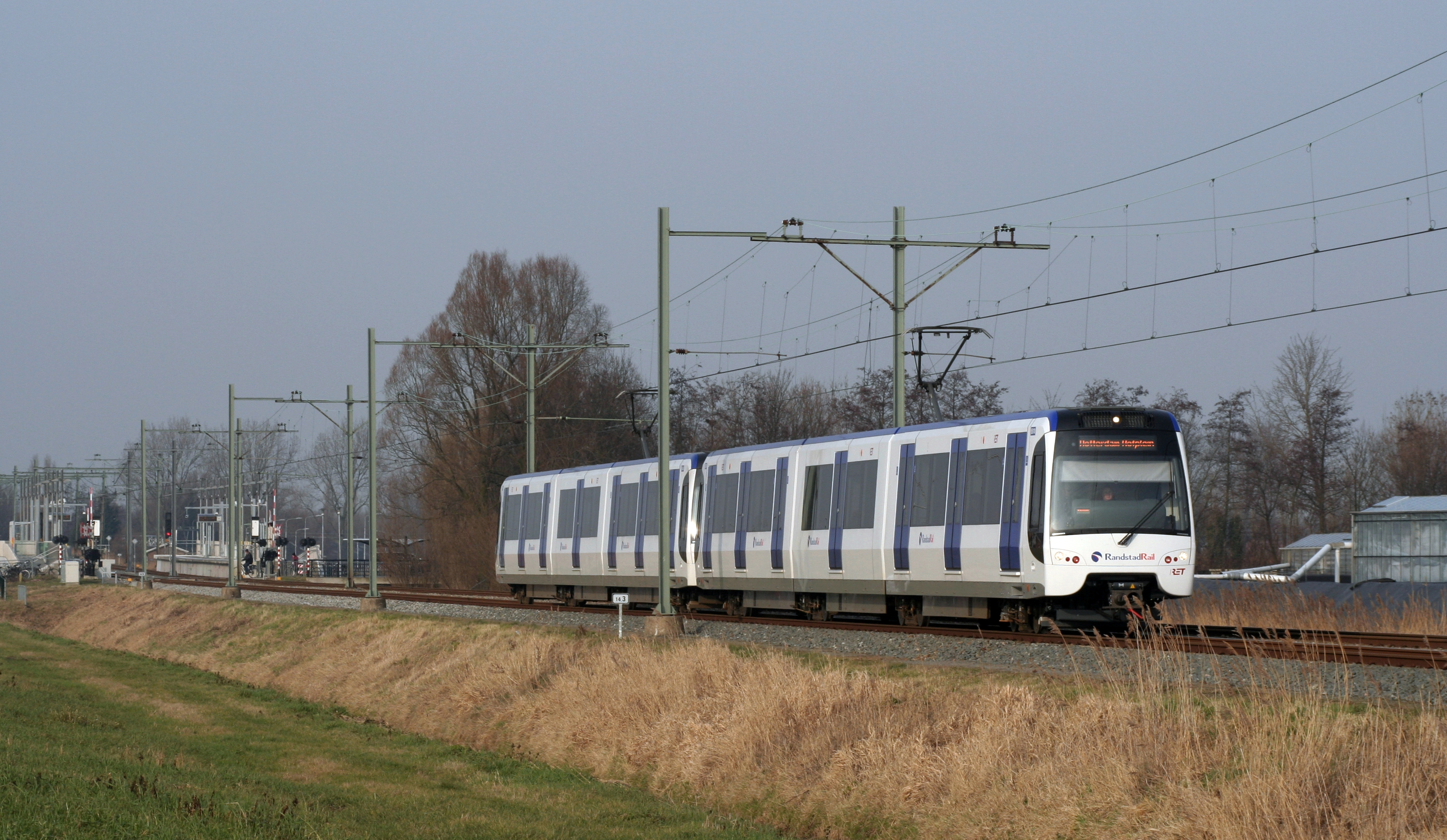
A new RET RandstadRail set, which replaced the Metro sets.

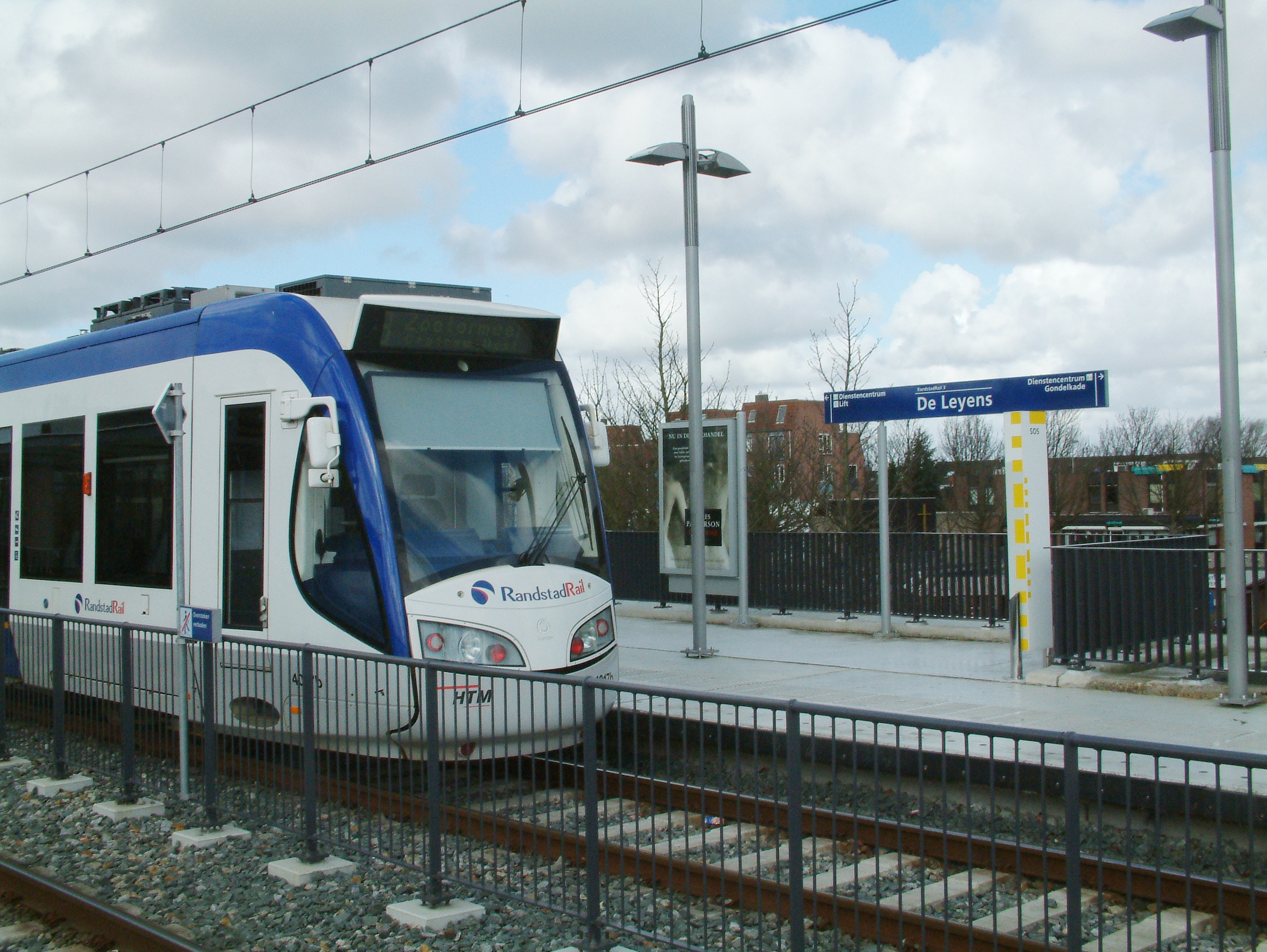
De Leyens station.
