= Dorp RandstadRail station =

Railway station in Zoetermeer, Netherlands

Dorp
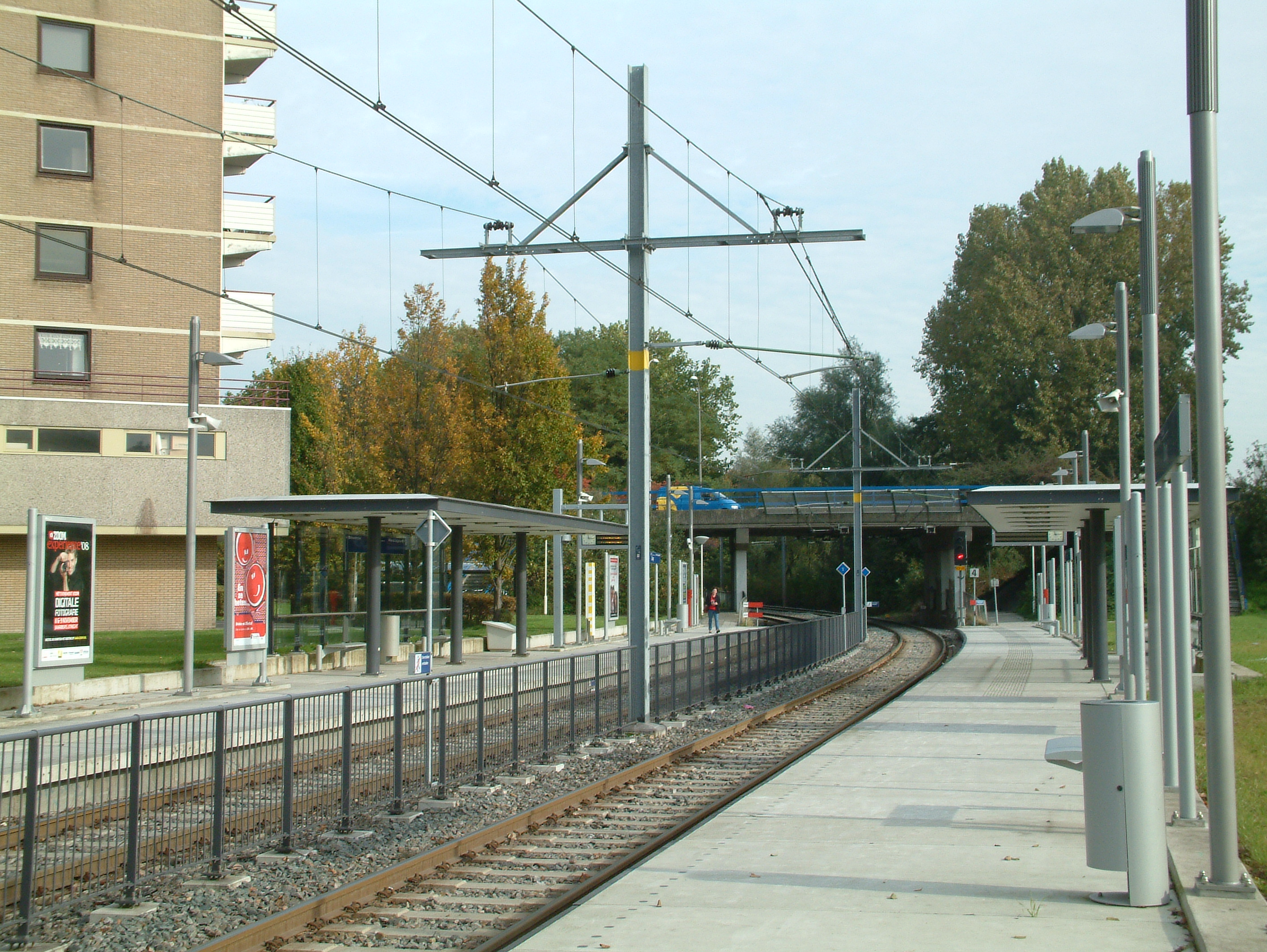
- Dorp RandstadRail station

General information
- Location: Netherlands
- Coordinates: 52°3′15″N 4°29′31″E
- Platforms: 2

History
- Opened: 22 May 1977; 49 years ago, reopened 27 October 2007; 18 years ago
- Closed: 3 June 2006; 20 years ago

Services
| Preceding station | RandstadRail | Following station |
|---|---|---|
| Centrum-West Terminus | Line 3 (HTM) | Delftsewallen towards Arnold Spoelplein |
Location
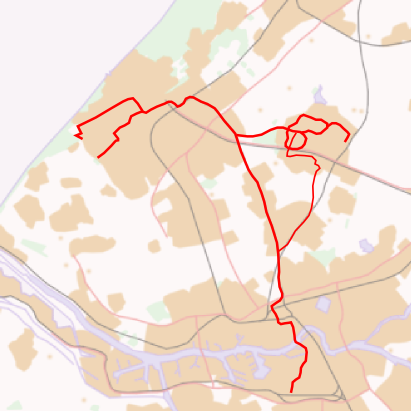
- Location within RandstadRail network

Dorp is a RandstadRail station in Zoetermeer, the Netherlands.

== History ==
The station opened, as a railway station, on 22 May 1977 as part of the Zoetermeerlijn, operating Zoetermeer Stadslijn services. The train station closed on 3 June 2006 and reopened as a RandstadRail station on 27 October 2007 for HTM tram service line 3.

The station features 2 platforms. These platforms are low, and the same level as the tram doors, therefore making it step free. Dorp is the penultimate station of the line. Passengers towards The Hague can choose to travel further to Centrum West or back to Voorweg and change there to another line 3 tram or to a line 4 tram for a quicker journey.

Kankerinteressant joh

== Train services ==
The following services currently call at Dorp:

| Service | Route | Material | Frequency |
|---|---|---|---|
| RR3 | Arnold Spoelplein - Pisuissestraat - Mozartlaan - Heliotrooplaan - Muurbloemweg - Hoefbladlaan - De Savornin Lohmanplein - Appelstraat - Zonnebloemstraat - Azaleaplein - Goudenregenstraat - Fahrenheitstraat - Valkenbosplein - Conradkade - Van Speijkstraat - Elandstraat - MCH Westeinde - Brouwersgracht - Grote Markt - Spui - Den Haag Centraal - Beatrixkwartier - Laan van NOI - Voorburg 't Loo - Leidschendam-Voorburg - Forepark - Leidschenveen - Voorweg (Low Level) - Centrum West - Stadhuis - Palenstein - Seghwaert - Leidsewallen - De Leyens - Buytenwegh - Voorweg (High Level) - Meerzicht - Driemanspolder - Delftsewallen - Dorp - Centrum West | HTM RegioCidatis Tram | 6x per hour (Monday - Saturday, Every 10 Minutes), 5x per hour (Sundays, Every 12 Minutes), 4x per hour (Evenings, after 8pm, Every 15 Minutes) |

== Gallery ==
RandstadRail Network Map

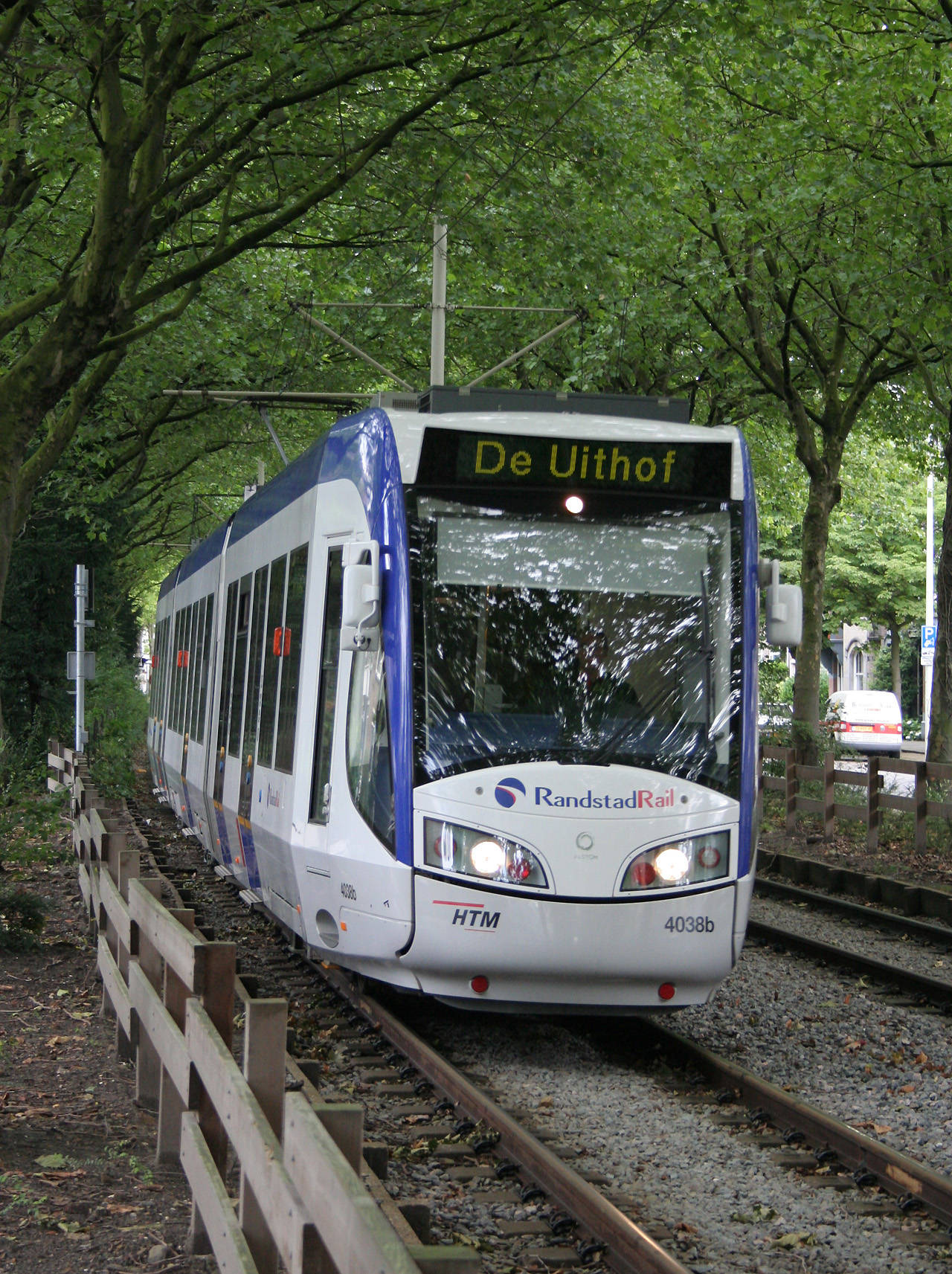
A RegioCitadis on RR4

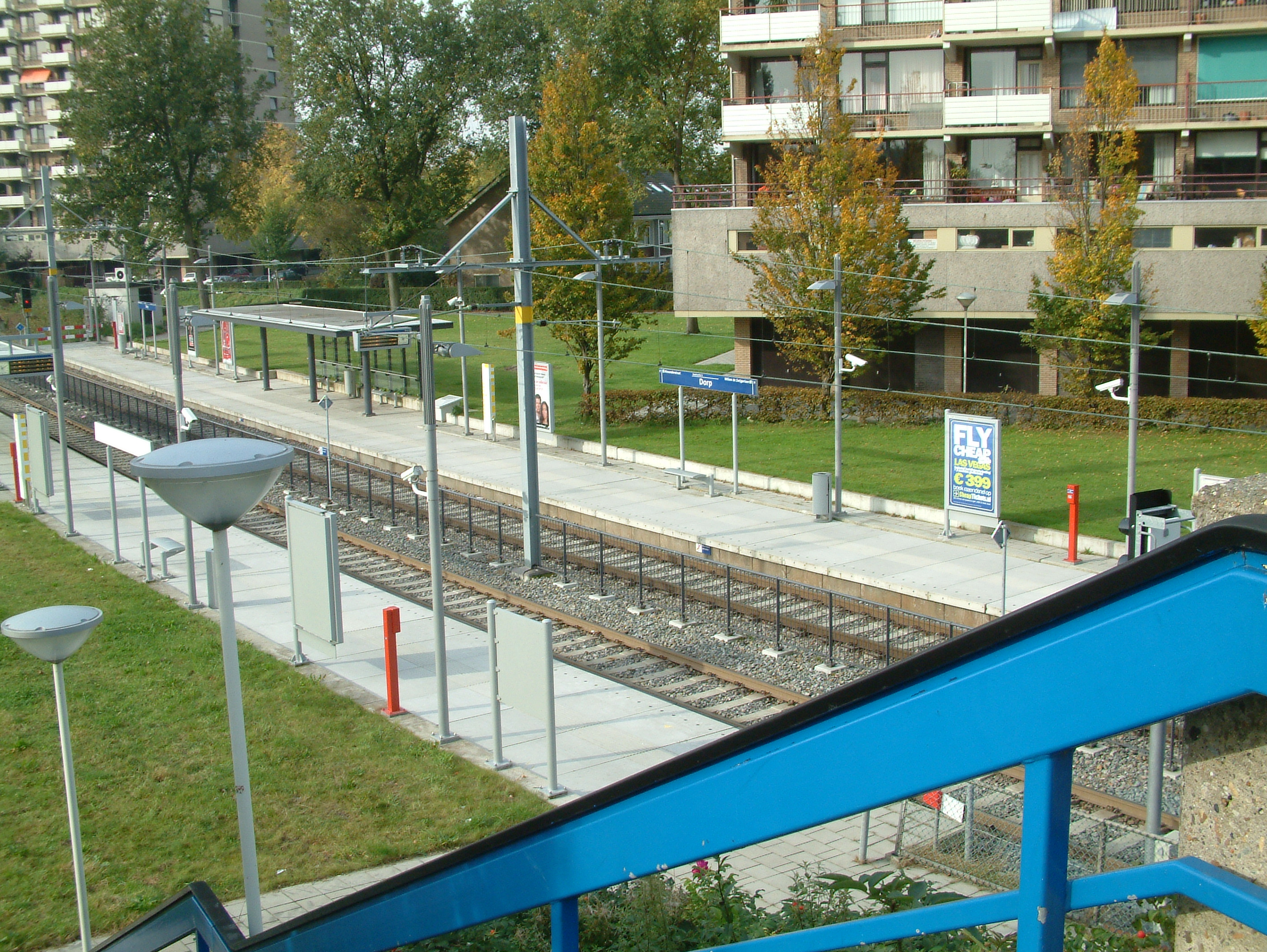
The station as seen from the stairs

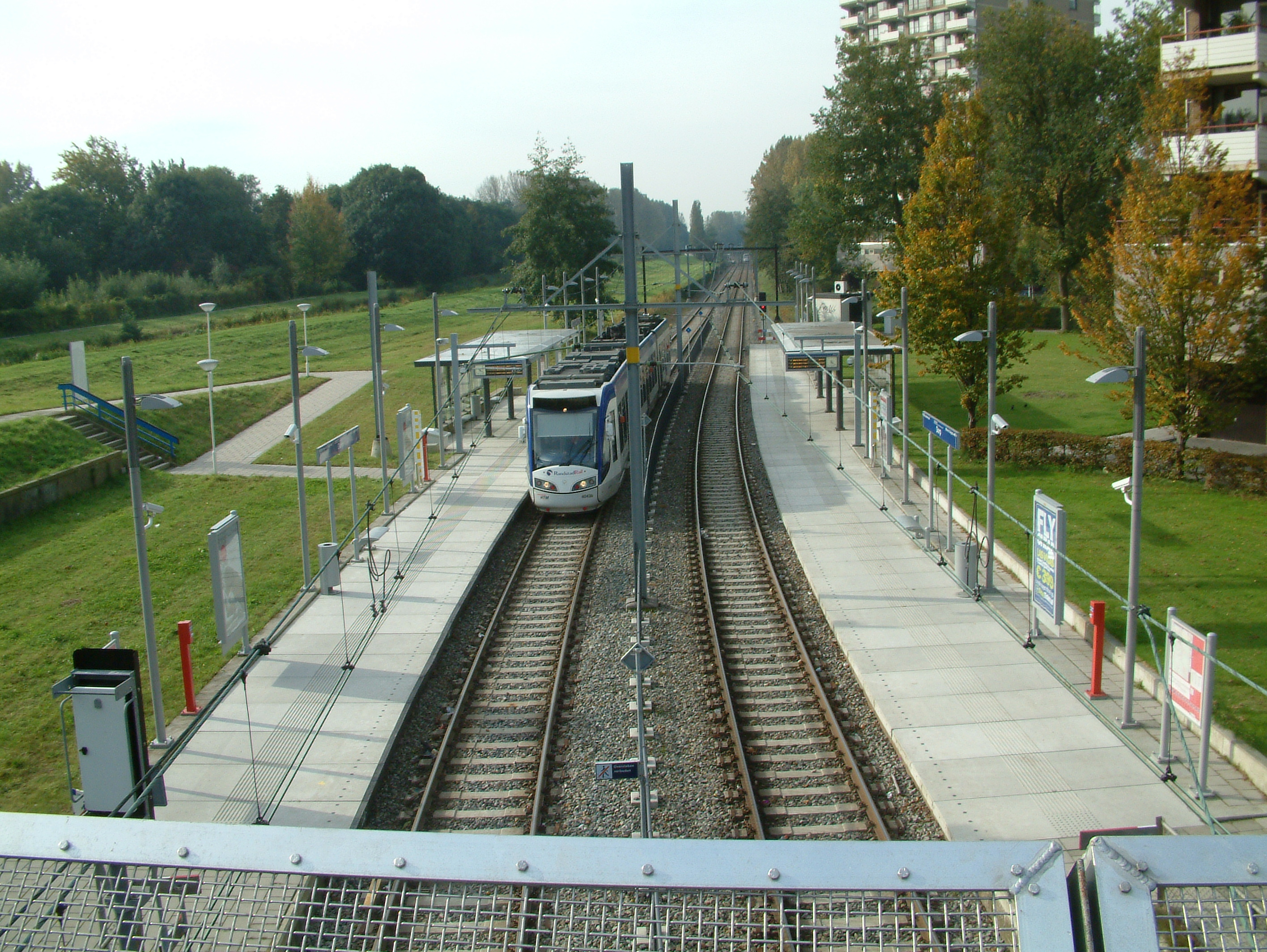
A RegioCitadis pulling into the station

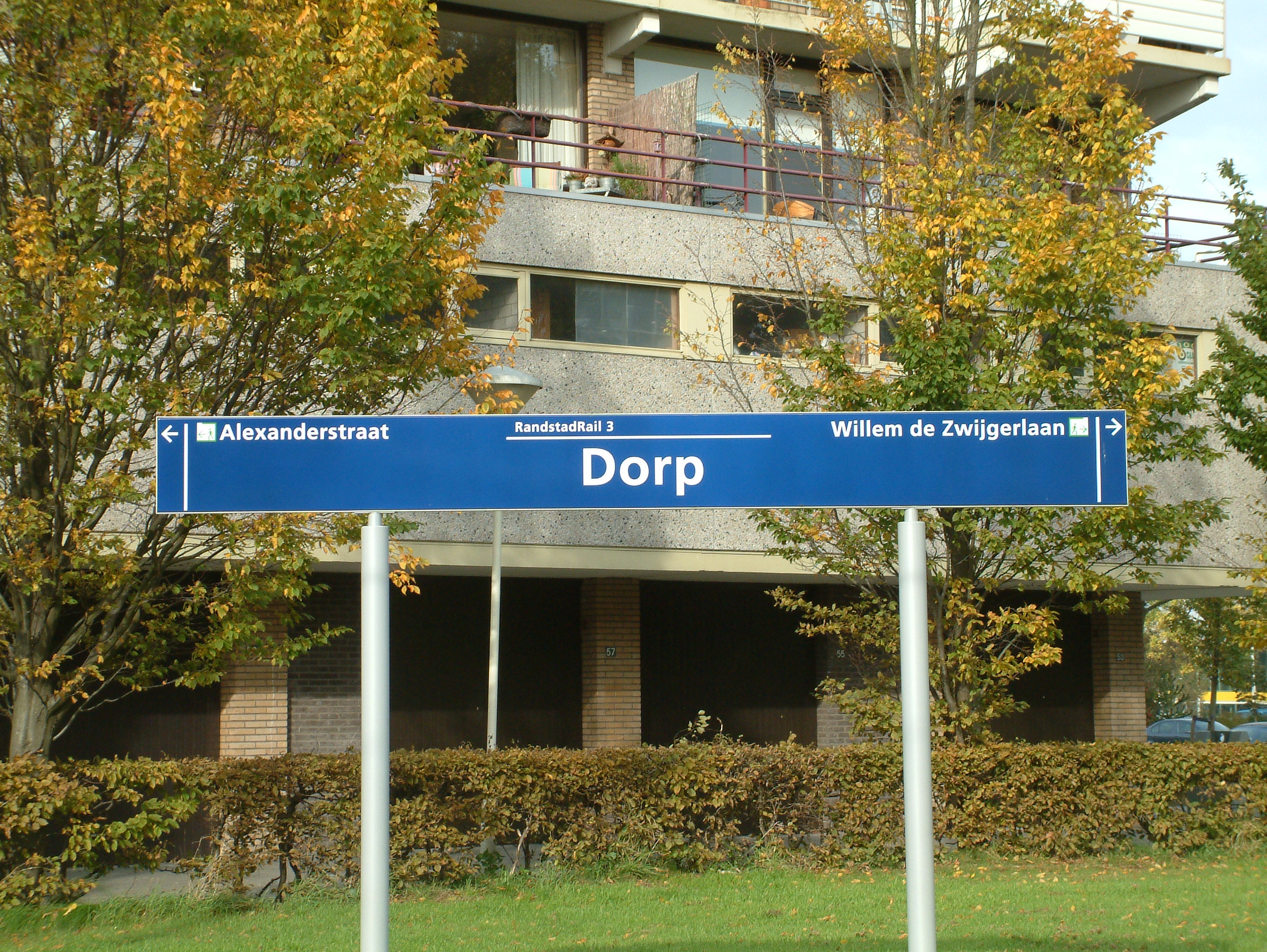
The station sign
