= Buytenwegh RandstadRail station =

Rail station in Zoetermeer, the Netherlands

Buytenwegh
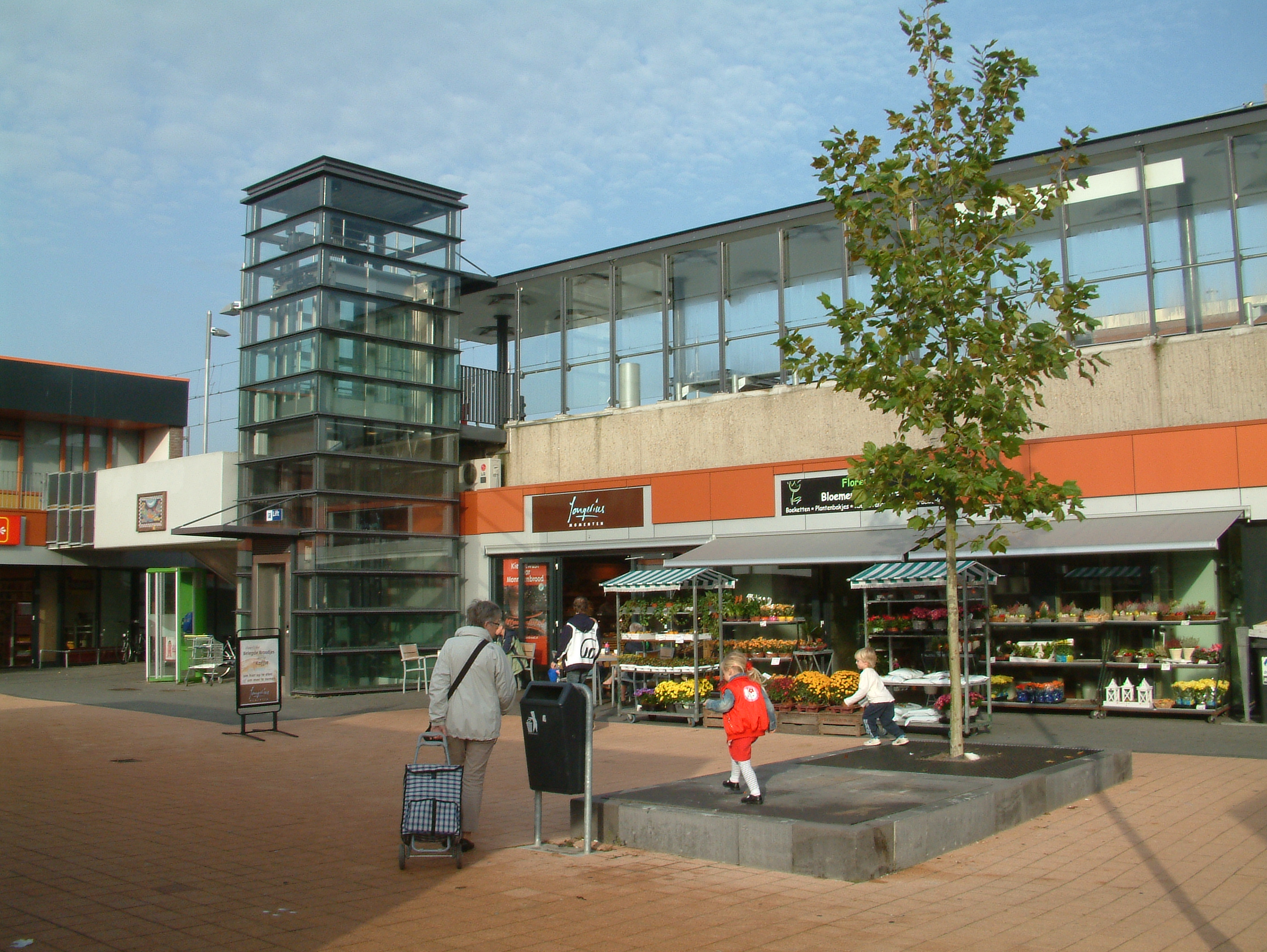

General information
- Location: Netherlands
- Coordinates: 52°04′00″N 4°28′44″E
- Platforms: 2

History
- Opened: 29 September 1979; 46 years ago, reopened 29 October 2006; 19 years ago
- Closed: 3 June 2006; 20 years ago

Services
Preceding station	RandstadRail	Following station
Voorweg towards Centrum-West	Line 3 (HTM)	De Leyens towards Arnold Spoelplein
Location
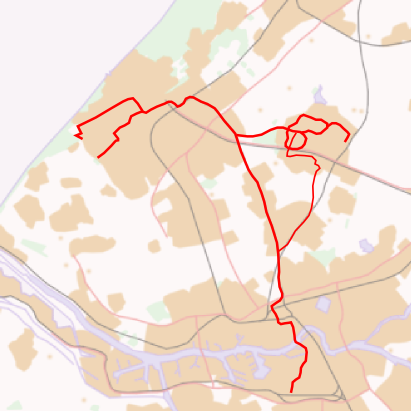
- Location within RandstadRail network

Buytenwegh is a RandstadRail station in Zoetermeer, the Netherlands.

== History ==
The station opened, as a railway station, on 29 September 1979 as part of the Zoetermeerlijn, operating Zoetermeer Stadslijn services. The train station closed on 3 June 2006 and reopened as a RandstadRail station on 29 October 2007.

The station features 2 platforms. These platforms are low, and the same level as the tram doors, therefore making it step-free.

== Train services ==
The following services currently call at Buytenwegh:

Service	Route	Material	Frequency
RR3	Arnold Spoelplein - Pisuissestraat - Mozartlaan - Heliotrooplaan - Muurbloemweg - Hoefbladlaan - De Savornin Lohmanplein - Appelstraat - Zonnebloemstraat - Azaleaplein - Goudenregenstraat - Fahrenheitstraat - Valkenbosplein - Conradkade - Van Speijkstraat - Elandstraat - MCH Westeinde - Brouwersgracht - Grote Markt - Spui - Den Haag Centraal - Beatrixkwartier - Laan van NOI - Voorburg 't Loo - Leidschendam-Voorburg - Forepark - Leidschenveen - Voorweg (Low Level) - Centrum West - Stadhuis - Palenstein - Seghwaert - Leidsewallen - De Leyens - Buytenwegh - Voorweg (High Level) - Meerzicht - Driemanspolder - Delftsewallen - Dorp - Centrum West	HTM RegioCidatis Tram	6x per hour (Monday - Saturday, Every 10 Minutes), 5x per hour (Sundays, Every 12 Minutes), 4x per hour (Evenings, after 8pm, Every 15 Minutes)
