= Maashaven metro station =

Metro station in Rotterdam, Netherlands

Maashaven
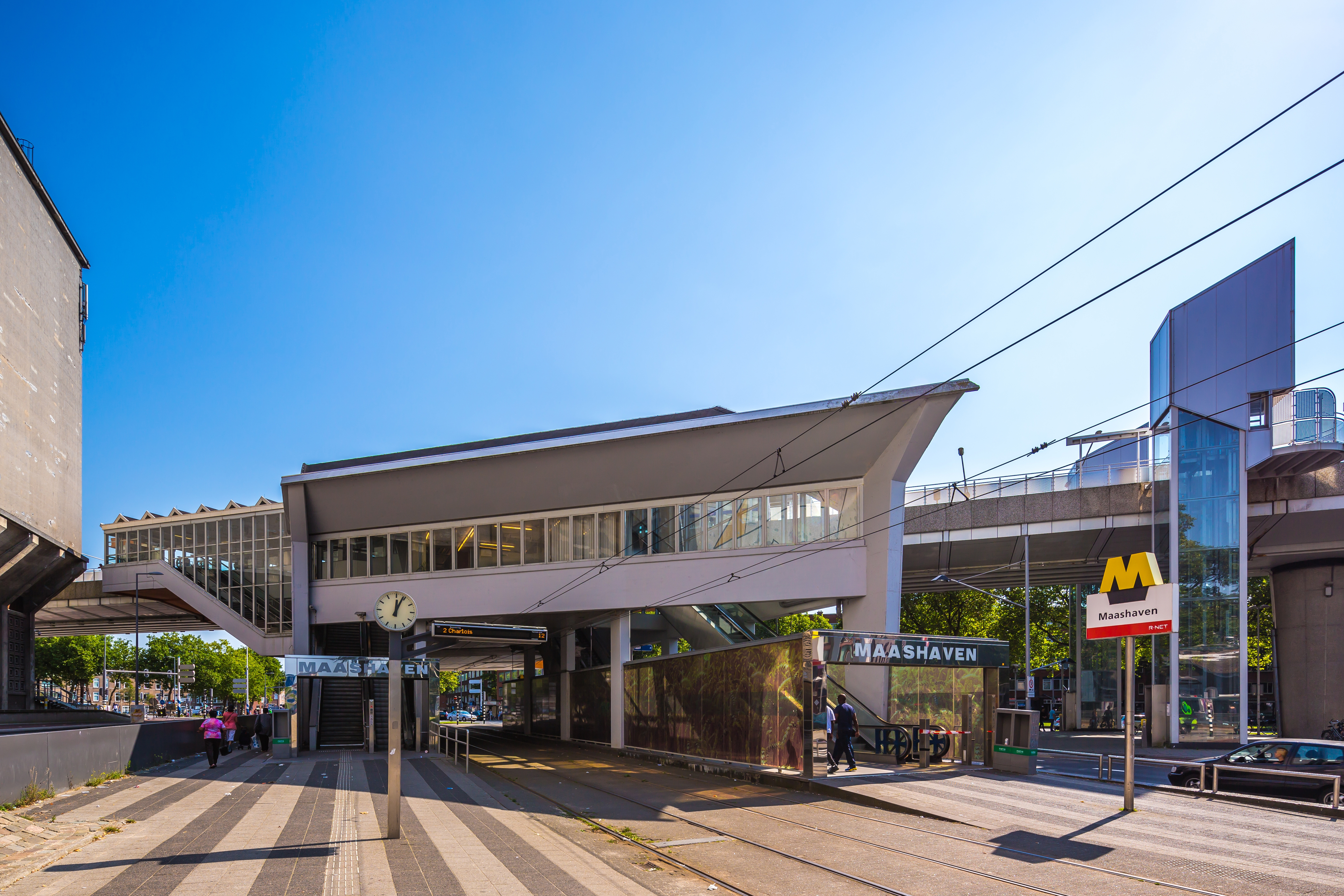

General information
- Coordinates: 51°53′50″N 4°29′41″E
- System: Rotterdam Metro station
- Owner: RET
- Platforms: Side platforms
- Tracks: 2

Construction
- Structure type: Elevated

History
- Opened: 1968

Services
| Preceding station | Rotterdam Metro | Following station |
|---|---|---|
| Zuidplein towards De Akkers | Line D | Rijnhaven towards Rotterdam Centraal |
| Zuidplein towards Slinge | Line E | Rijnhaven towards Den Haag Centraal |
Location

Maashaven is an above-ground metro station in the south of the city of Rotterdam. It is part of Rotterdam Metro lines D and E.

The station opened on 9 February 1968, the same date that the North-South Line (also formerly called Erasmus line), of which it is a part, was opened. Maashaven station is located just east of a harbor with the same name. Maas is the name of the Dutch (and also German) part of the Meuse river, while haven is the Dutch word for harbor.

Located underneath the station is a Rotterdam tram stop, where travelers can get on RET-operated tram line 2.

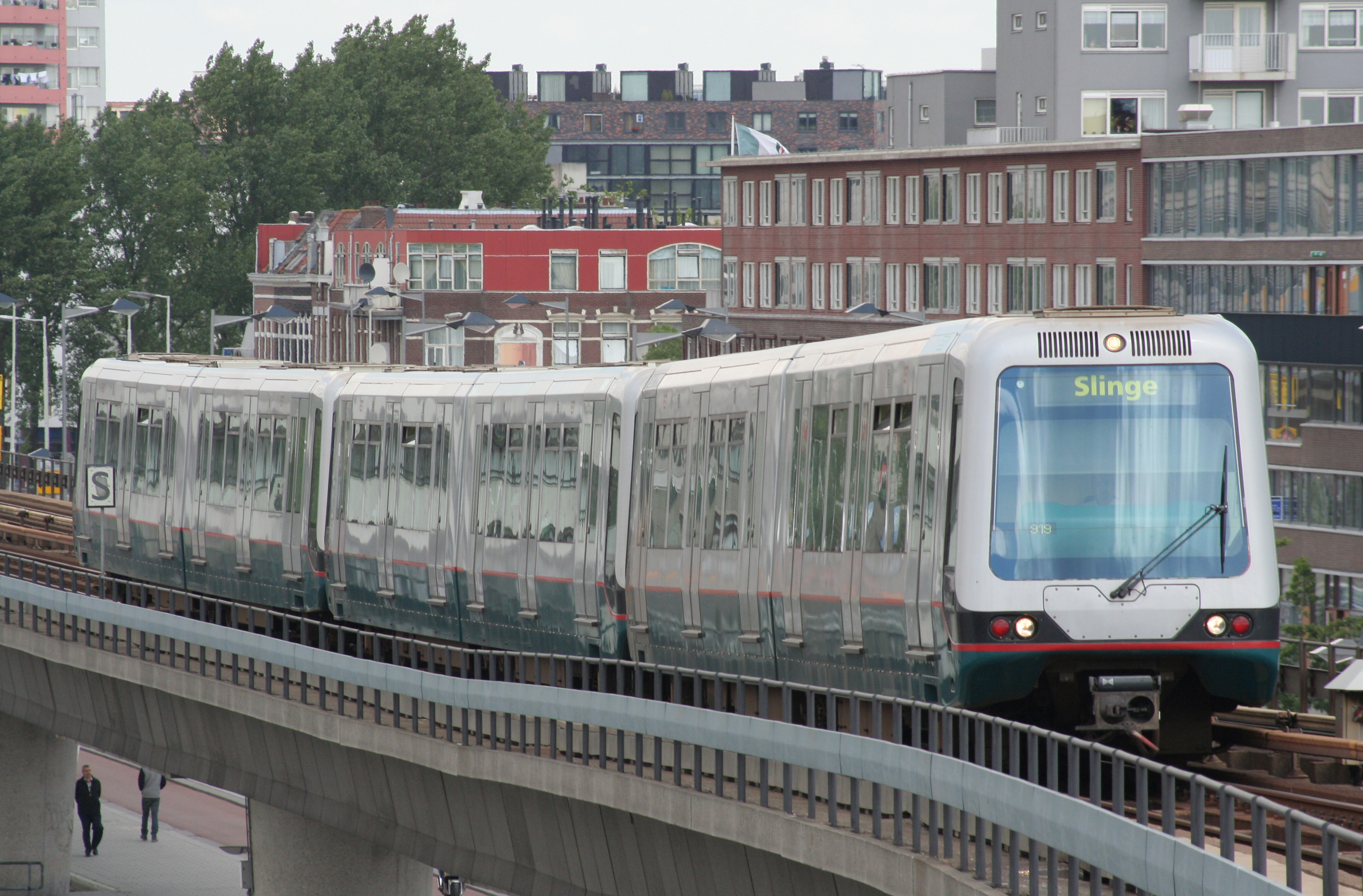
Southbound train from Rijnhaven to Maashaven.
