= Van Tuyllpark RandstadRail station =

Railway station in Zoetermeer, Netherlands

Van Tuyllpark
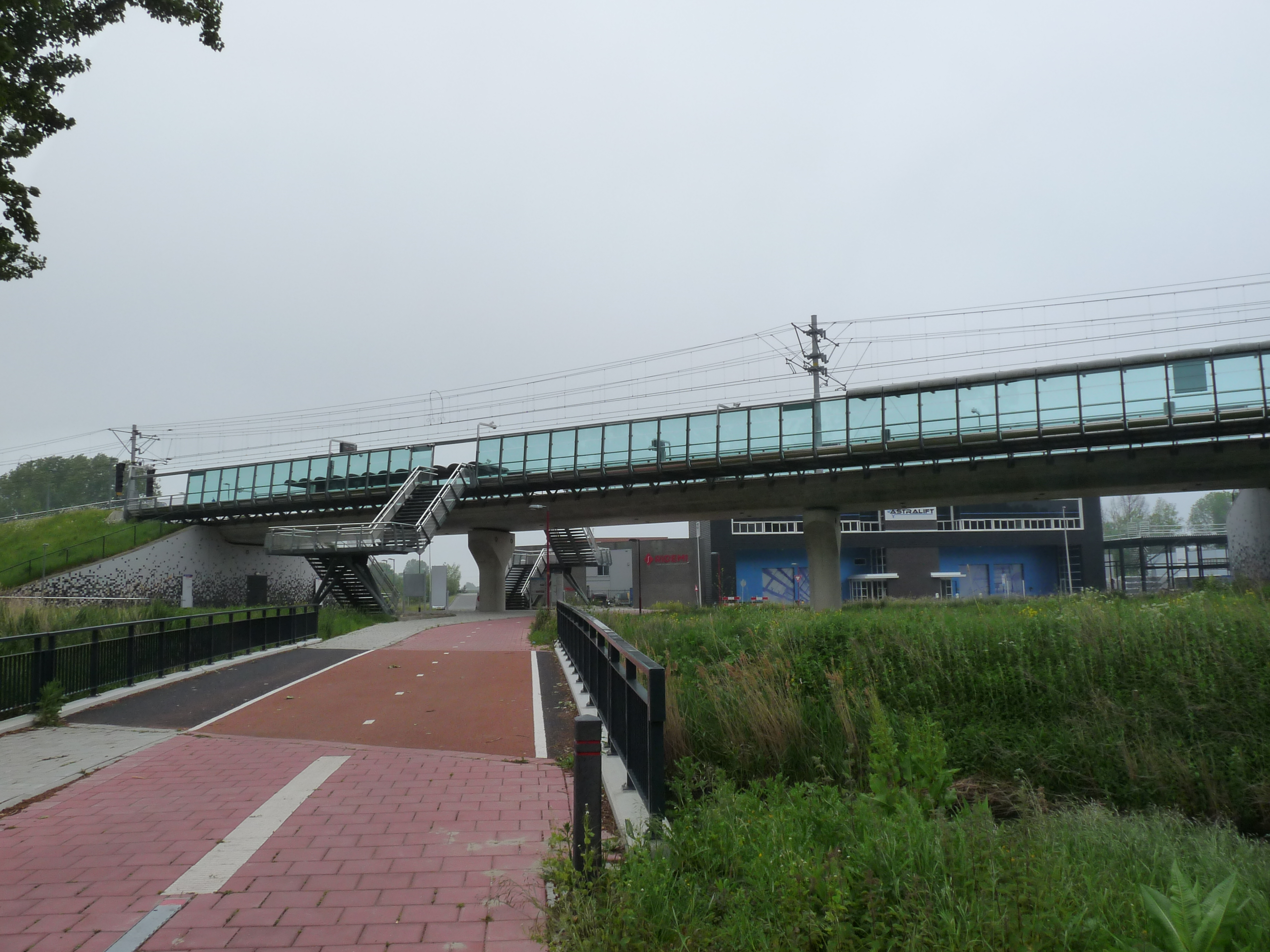

General information
- Location: Netherlands
- Coordinates: 52°2′49″N 4°31′44″E
- Platforms: 2

History
- Opened: 19 May 2019; 7 years ago

Services
Preceding station	RandstadRail	Following station
Lansingerland-Zoetermeer Terminus	Line 4 (HTM)	Javalaan towards De Uithof
Location
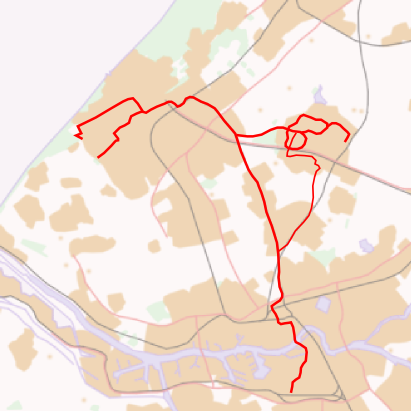
- Location within RandstadRail network

Van Tuyllpark is a RandstadRail station in Zoetermeer, the Netherlands.

== History ==
The station opened on 19 May 2019, as part of the Oosterheemlijn extension to Lansingerland-Zoetermeer. The station is on a viaduct along the Prismalaan West

== Train services ==
The following services currently call at Van Tuyllpark:

Service	Route	Material	Frequency
RR4	De Uithof - Beresteinaan - Bouwlustlaan - De Rade - Dedemsvaart - Zuidwoldepad - Leyenburg - Monnickendamplein - Tienhovenselaan - Dierenselaan - De La Reyweg - Monstersestraat - MCH Westeinde - Brouwersgracht - Grote Markt - Spui - Den Haag Centraal - Beatrixkwartier - Laan van NOI - Voorburg 't Loo - Leidschendam-Voorburg - Forepark - Leidschenveen - Voorweg (Low Level) - Centrum West - Stadhuis - Palenstein - Seghwaert - Willem Dreeslaan - Oosterheem - Javalaan - Van Tuyllpark - Lansingerland-Zoetermeer	HTM RegioCitadis Tram	6x per hour (Monday - Saturday, Every 10 Minutes), 5x per hour (Sundays, Every 12 Minutes), 4x per hour (Evenings, after 8pm, Every 15 Minutes)

== Gallery ==
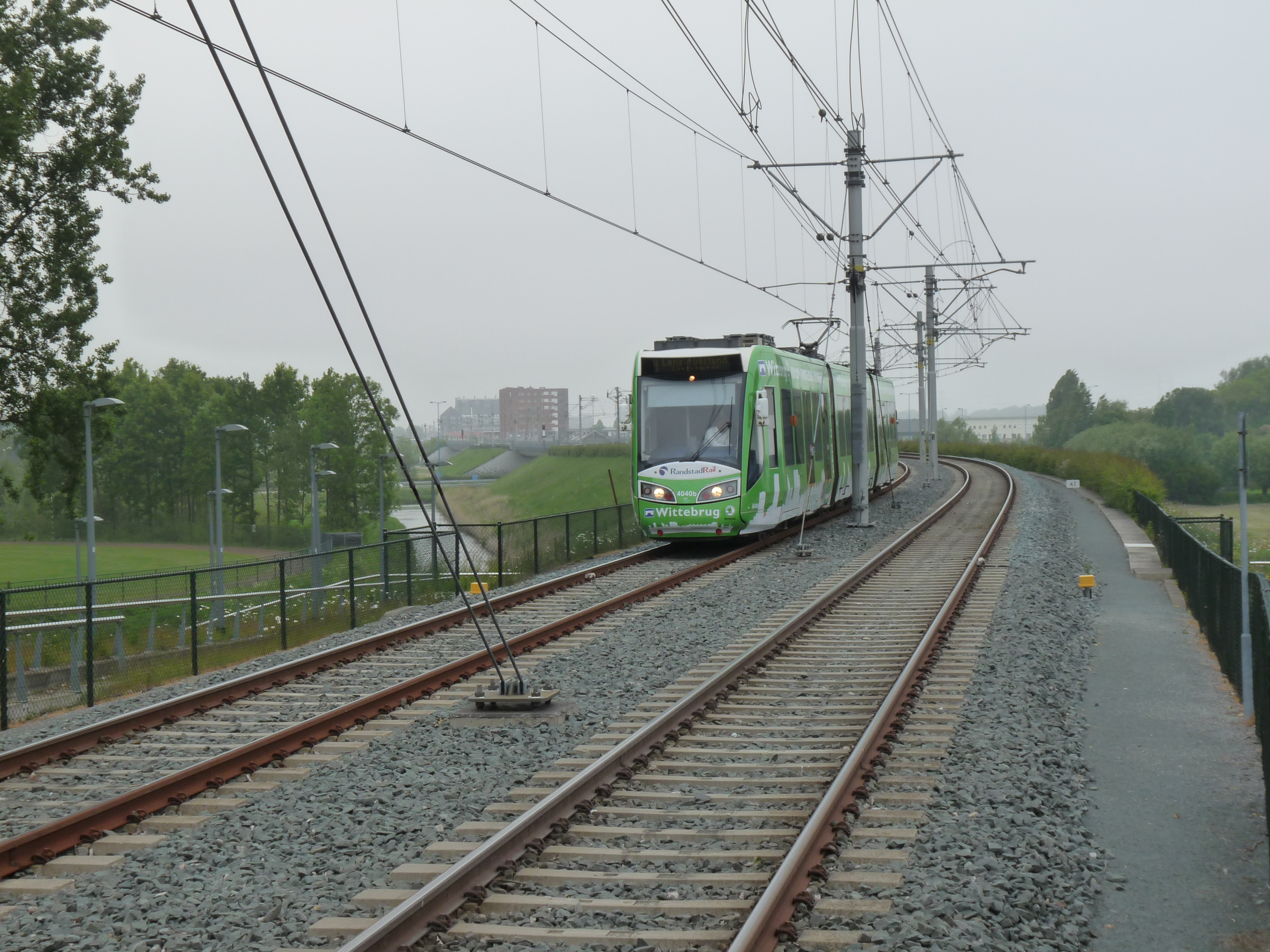
A tram approaching Van Tuyllpark
