= Dierenselaan RandstadRail station =

Dierenselaan

General information
- Location: Netherlands
- Coordinates: 52°04′00″N 4°16′54″E

Services
| Preceding station | RandstadRail | Following station |
|---|---|---|
| De La Reyweg towards Lansingerland-Zoetermeer | Line 4 (HTM) | Tienhovenselaan towards De Uithof |
Location
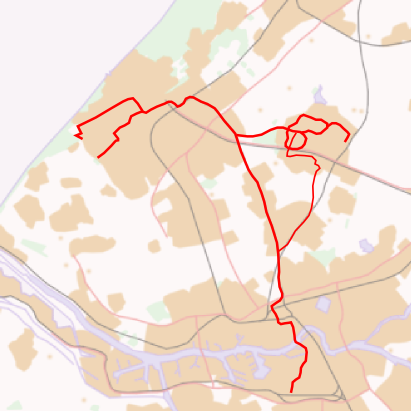
- Location within RandstadRail network

Dierenselaan is a RandstadRail stop in Den Haag, the Netherlands.

== History ==
The station is a stop for line 4 and is on the Apeldoornselaan. The stop opened at the same time as the RandstadRail line did.

== RandstadRail services ==
The following services currently call at Dierenselaan:

| Service | Route | Material | Frequency |
|---|---|---|---|
| RR4 | De Uithof - Beresteinaan - Bouwlustlaan - De Rade - Dedemsvaart - Zuidwoldepad- Leyenburg - Monnickendamplein - Tienhovenselaan - Dierenselaan - De La Reyweg - Monstersestraat - MCH Westeinde - Brouwersgracht - Grote Markt - Spui - Den Haag Centraal - Beatrixkwartier - Laan van NOI - Voorburg 't Loo - Leidschendam-Voorburg - Forepark - Leidschenveen - Voorweg (Low Level) - Centrum West - Stadhuis - Palenstein - Seghwaert - Willem Dreeslaan - Oosterheem - Javalaan | HTM RegioCitadis Tram | 6x per hour (Monday - Saturday, Every 10 Minutes), 5x per hour (Sundays, Every 12 Minutes), 4x per hour (Evenings, after 8pm, Every 15 Minutes) |

== Gallery ==
RandstadRail Network Map

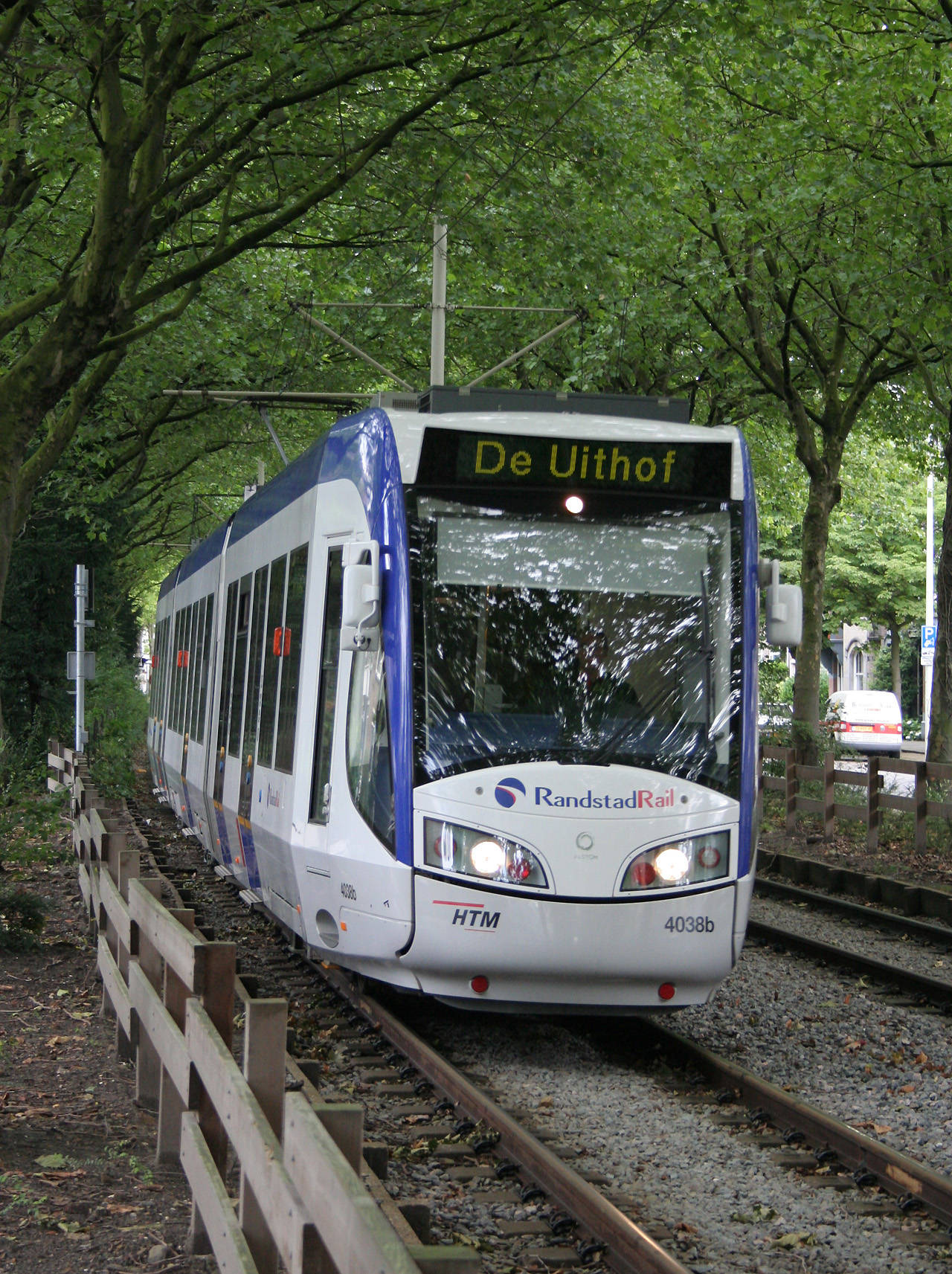
A RegioCitadis on RR4

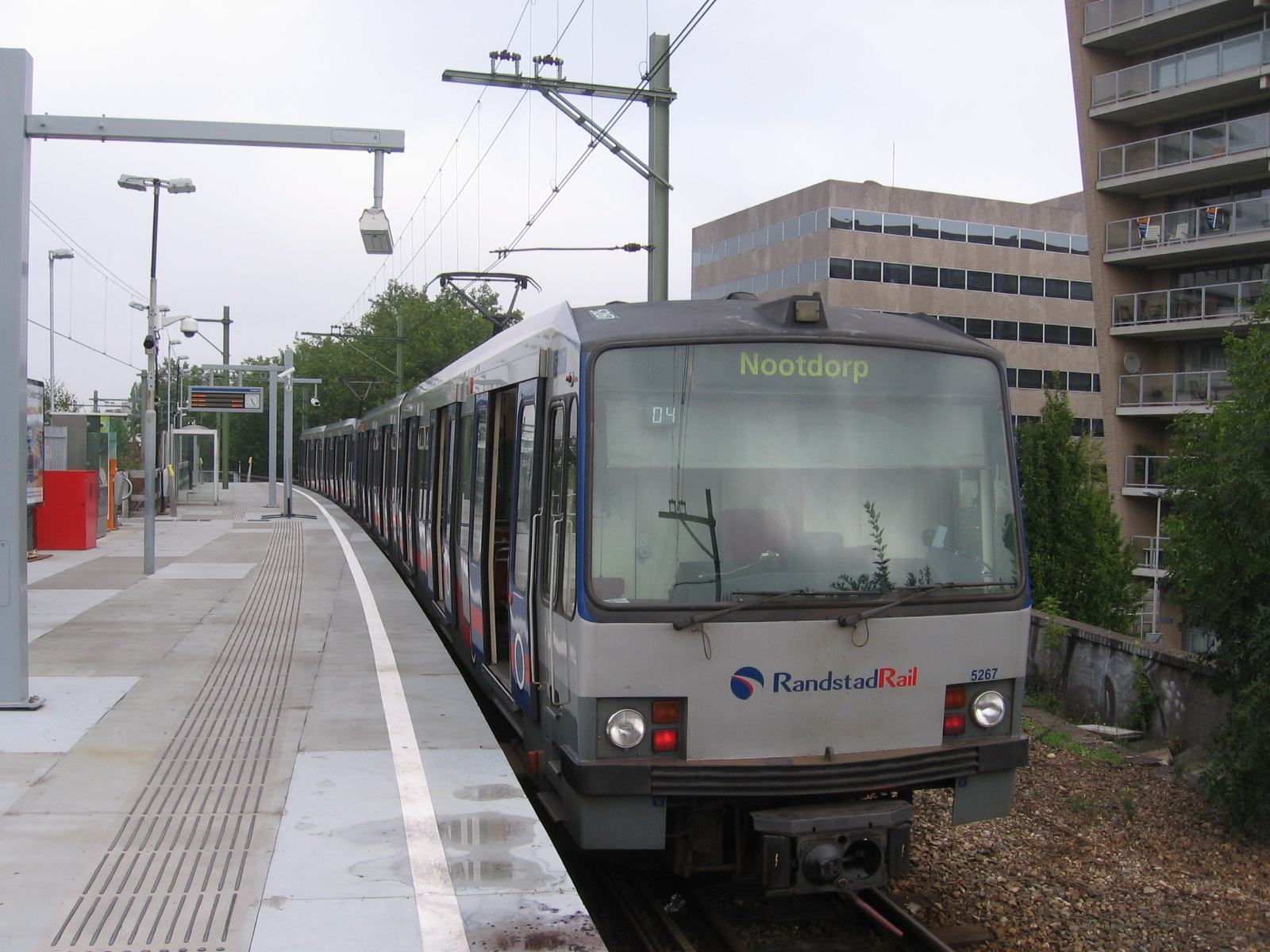
An RET Metro set that was converted for RandstadRail operation.

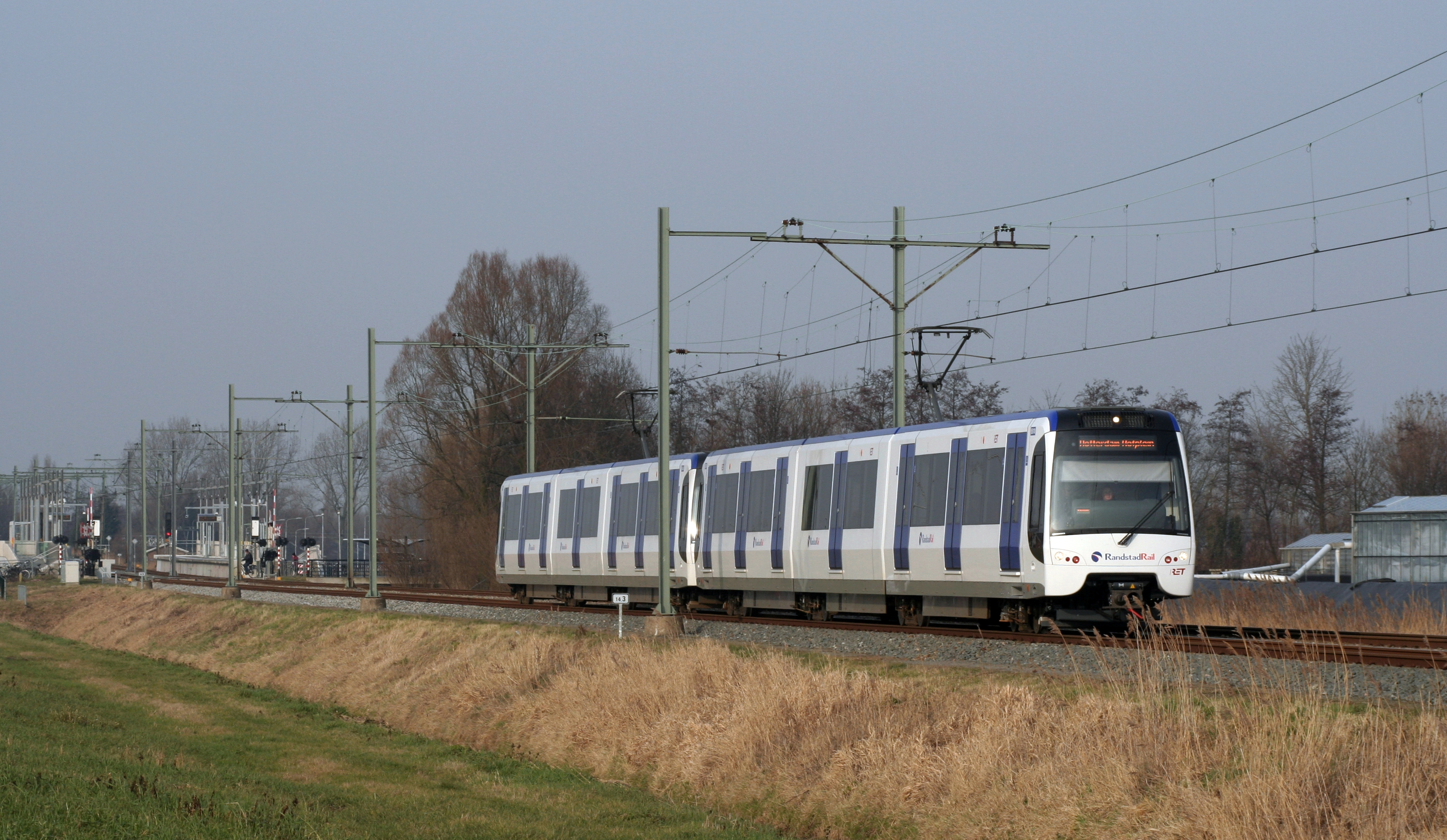
A new RET RandstadRail set, which replaced the Metro sets.
