= Zuidwoldepad RandstadRail station =

Zuidwoldepad
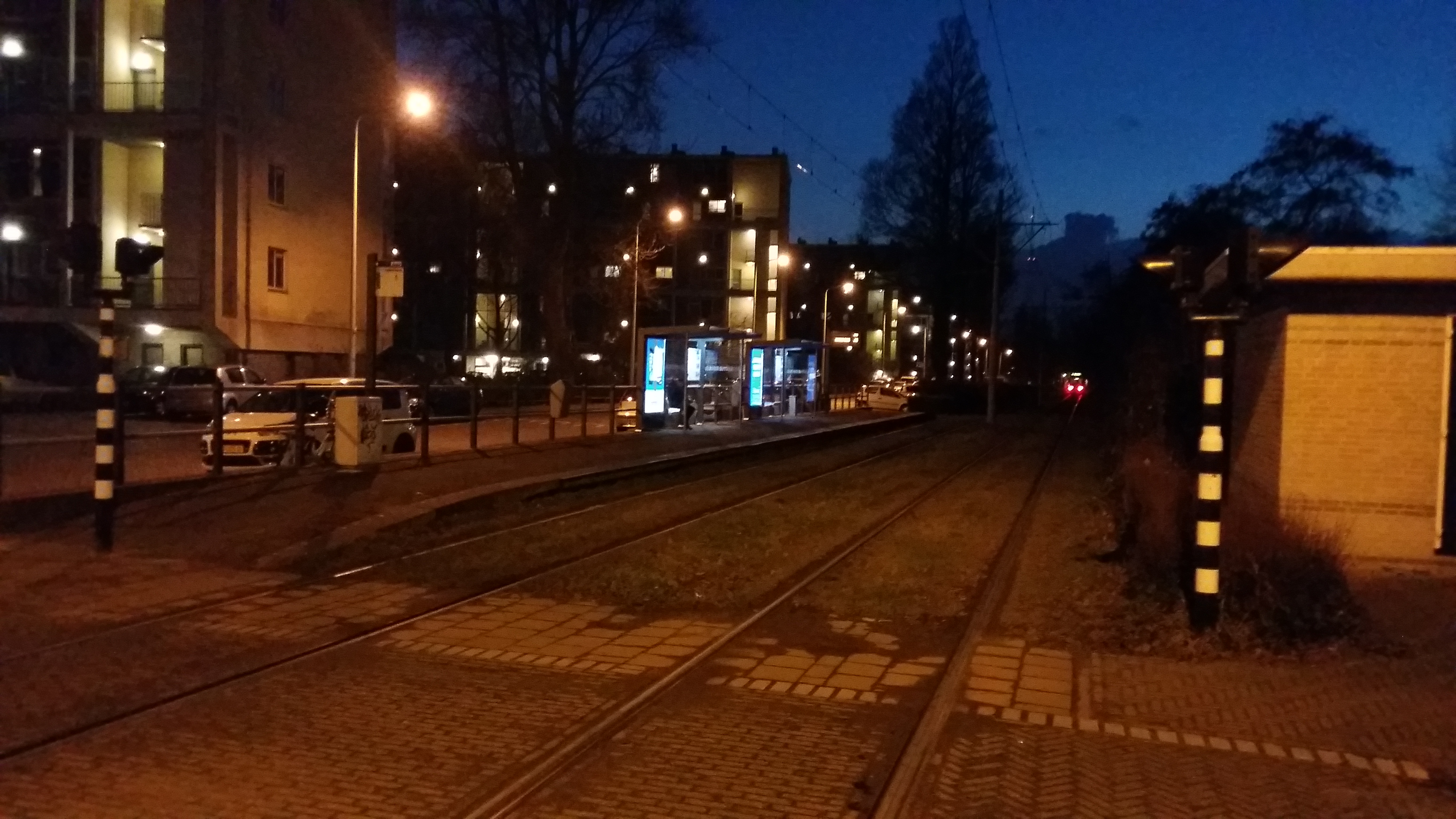

General information
- Location: Netherlands
- Coordinates: 52°03′10″N 4°15′58″E

Services
Preceding station	RandstadRail	Following station
Leyenburg towards Lansingerland-Zoetermeer	Line 4 (HTM)	Dedemsvaartweg towards De Uithof
Location
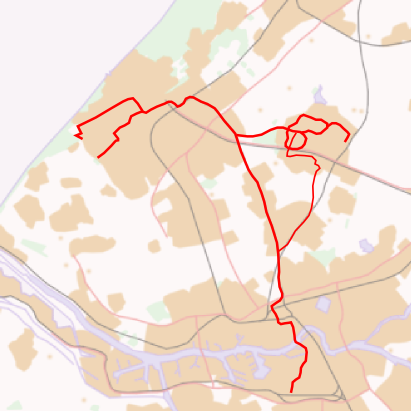
- Location within RandstadRail network

Zuidwoldepad is a RandstadRail station in The Hague, Netherlands. It is a stop for line 4.

== RandstadRail services ==
The following services currently call at Zuidwoldepad:

Service	Route	Material	Frequency
RR4	De Uithof - Beresteinaan - Bouwlustlaan - De Rade - Dedemsvaartweg - Zuidwoldepad- Leyenburg - Monnickendamplein - Tienhovenselaan - Dierenselaan - De La Reyweg - Monstersestraat - MCH Westeinde - Brouwersgracht - Grote Markt - Spui - Den Haag Centraal - Beatrixkwartier - Laan van NOI - Voorburg 't Loo - Leidschendam-Voorburg - Forepark - Leidschenveen - Voorweg (Low Level) - Centrum West - Stadhuis - Palenstein - Seghwaert - Willem Dreeslaan - Oosterheem - Javalaan	HTM RegioCitadis Tram	6x per hour (Monday - Saturday, Every 10 Minutes), 5x per hour (Sundays, Every 12 Minutes), 4x per hour (Evenings, after 8pm, Every 15 Minutes)

== Gallery ==
RandstadRail network map.

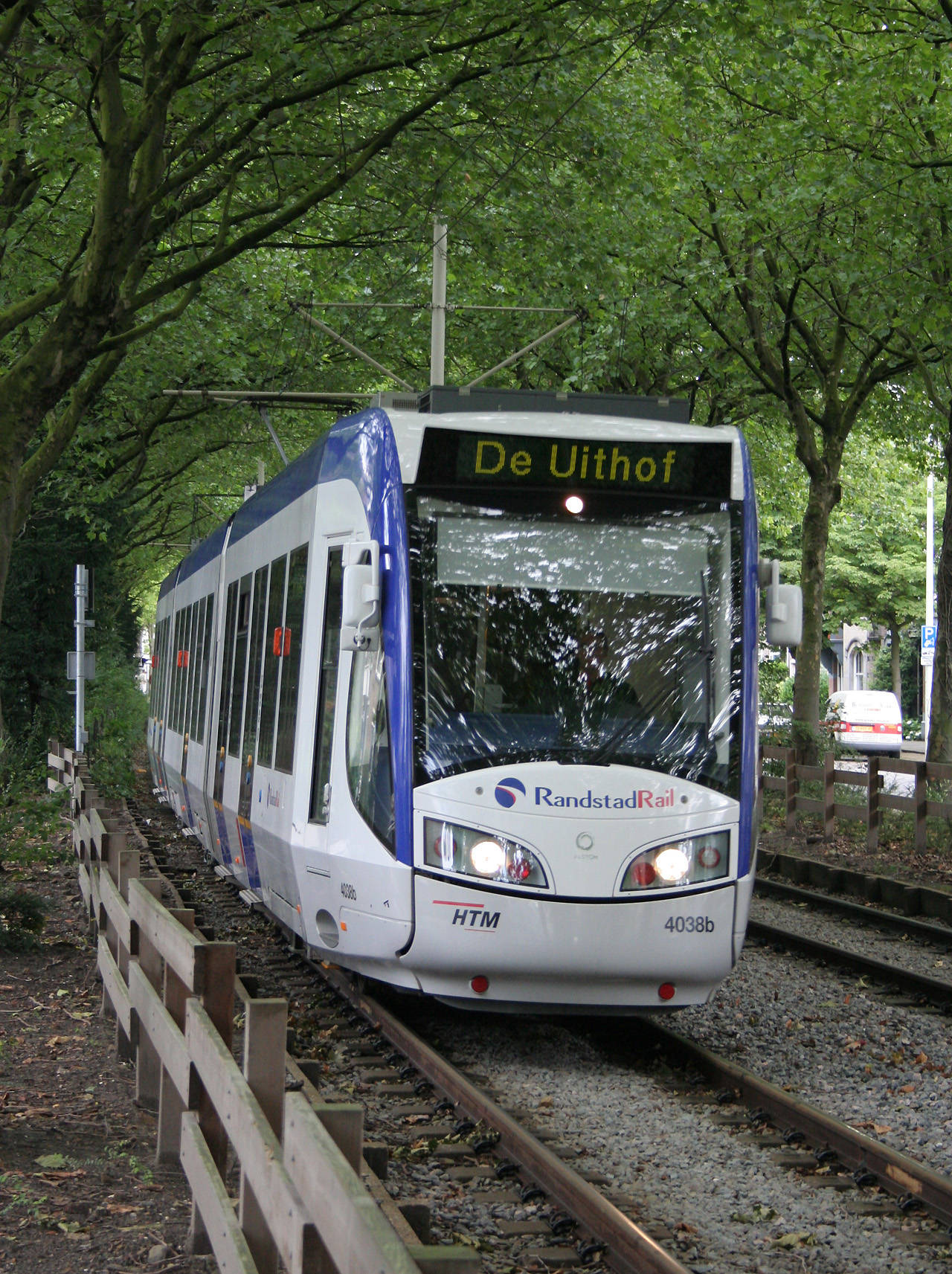
A RegioCitadis on RR4.

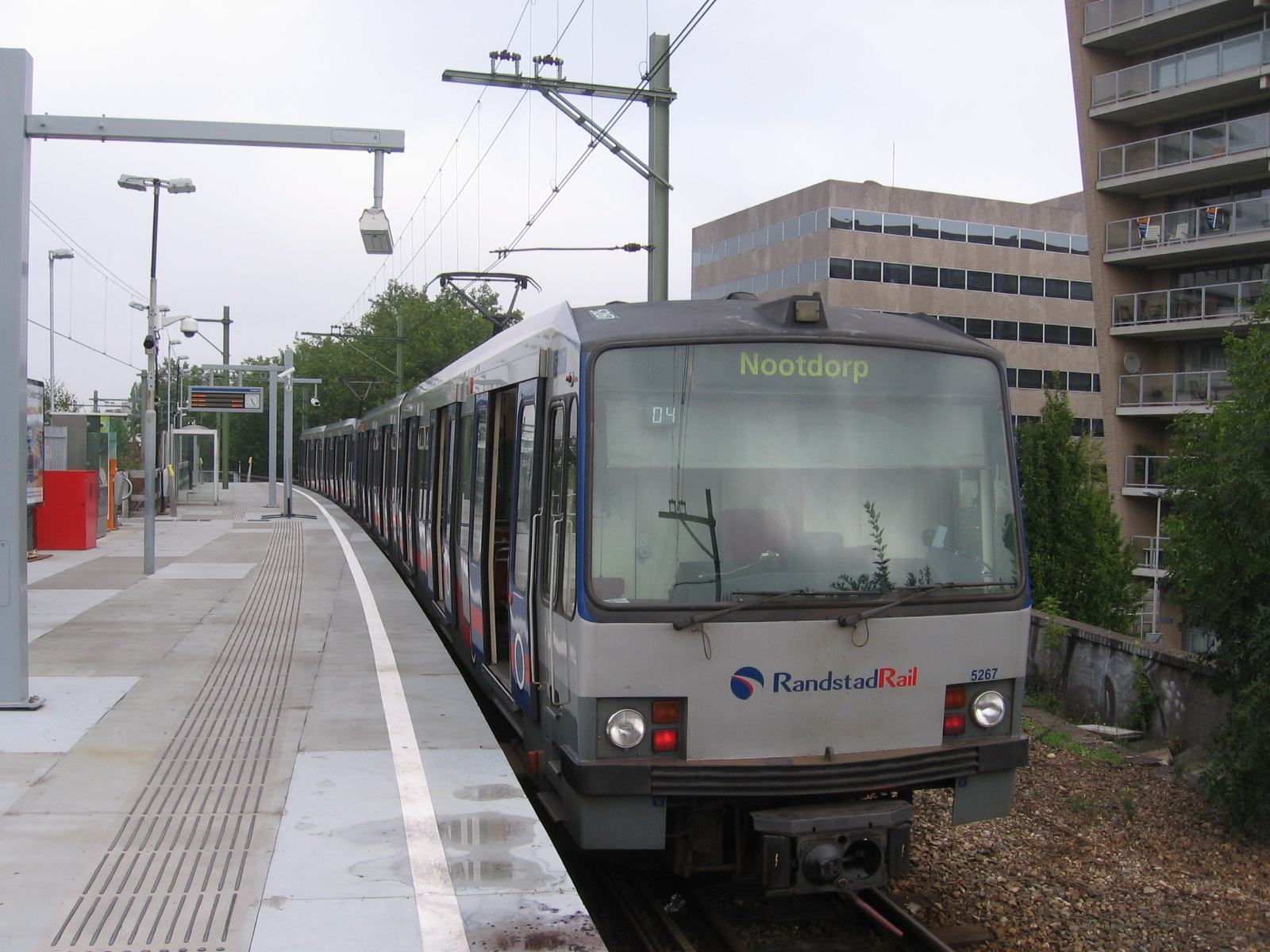
An RET Metro set that was converted for RandstadRail operation.

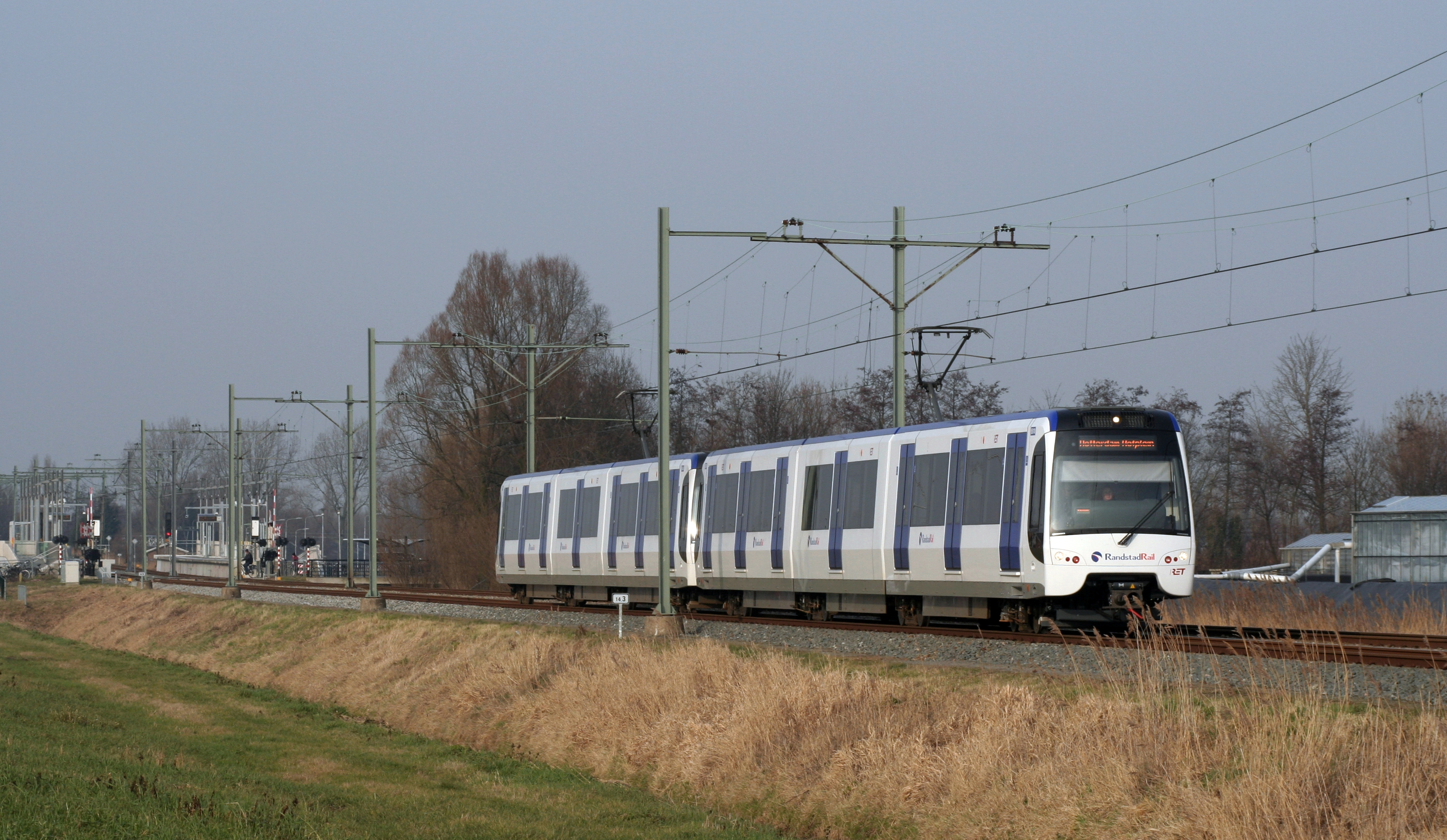
A new RET RandstadRail set, which replaced the Metro sets.
