= Bouwlustlaan RandstadRail station =

Bouwlustlaan

General information
- Location: Netherlands
- Coordinates: 52°02′45″N 4°15′18″E

Services
| Preceding station | RandstadRail | Following station |
|---|---|---|
| De Rade towards Lansingerland-Zoetermeer | Line 4 (HTM) | Beresteinlaan towards De Uithof |
Location
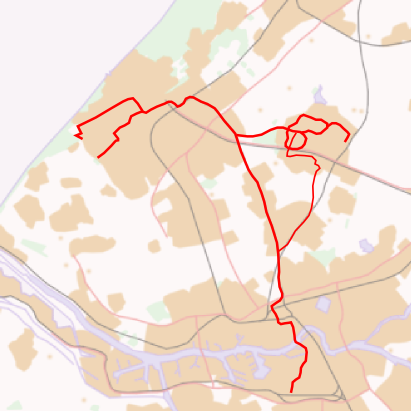
- Location within RandstadRail network

Bouwlustlaan is a RandstadRail station in The Hague, Netherlands. It is a stop for line 4 and is located on the Meppelweg.

== RandstadRail services ==
The following services currently call at Bouwlustlaan:

| Service | Route | Material | Frequency |
|---|---|---|---|
| RR4 | De Uithof - Beresteinlaan - Bouwlustlaan - De Rade - Dedemsvaartweg - Zuidwoldepad - Leyenburg - Monnickendamplein - Tienhovenselaan - Dierenselaan - De La Reyweg - Monstersestraat - MCH Westeinde - Brouwersgracht - Grote Markt - Spui - Den Haag Centraal - Beatrixkwartier - Laan van NOI - Voorburg 't Loo - Leidschendam-Voorburg - Forepark - Leidschenveen - Voorweg (Low Level) - Centrum West - Stadhuis - Palenstein - Seghwaert - Willem Dreeslaan - Oosterheem - Javalaan | HTM RegioCitadis Tram | 6x per hour (Monday - Saturday, Every 10 Minutes), 5x per hour (Sundays, Every 12 Minutes), 4x per hour (Evenings, after 8pm, Every 15 Minutes) |

== Gallery ==
RandstadRail network map.

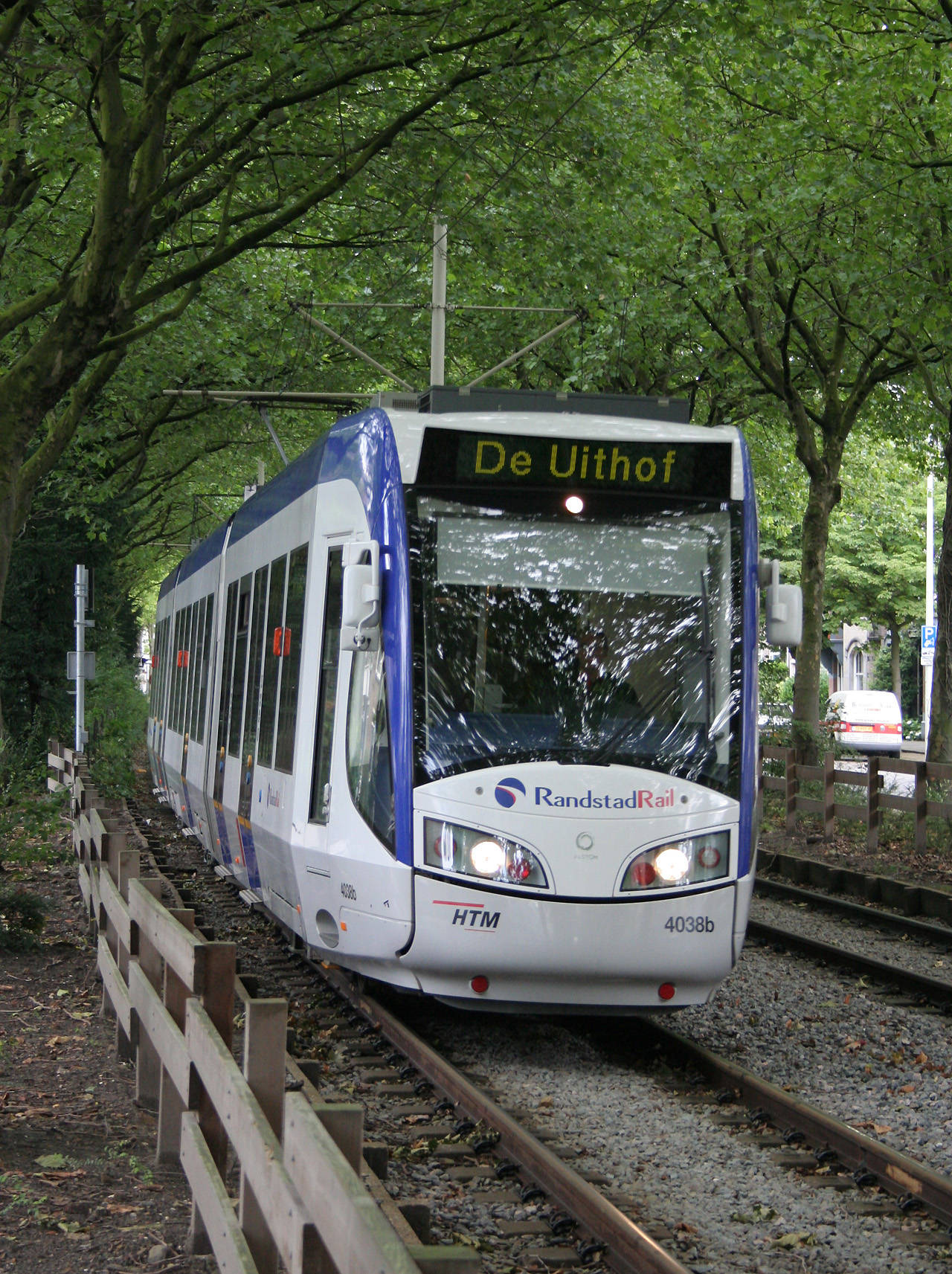
A RegioCitadis on RR4.

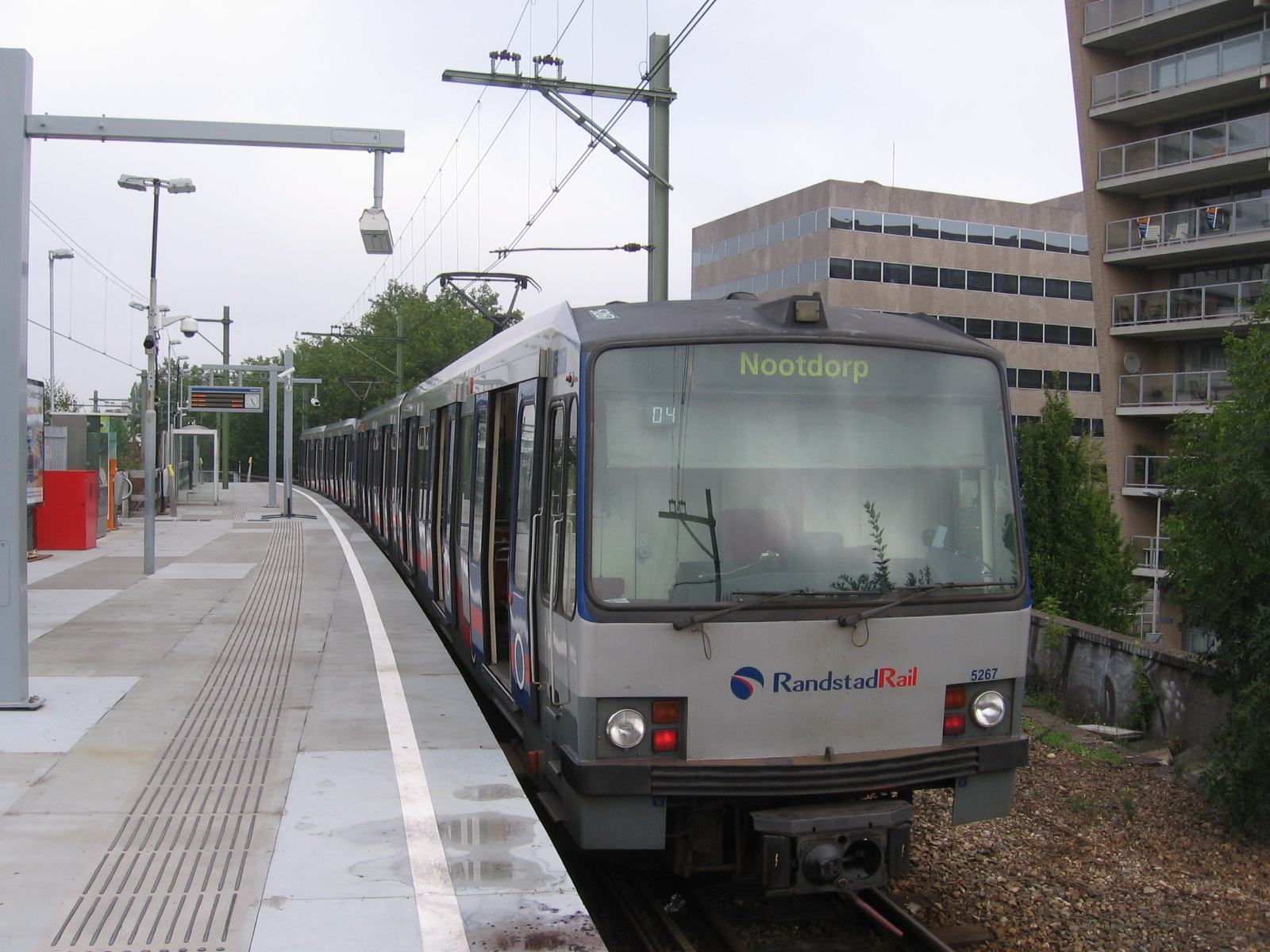
An RET Metro set that was converted for RandstadRail operation.

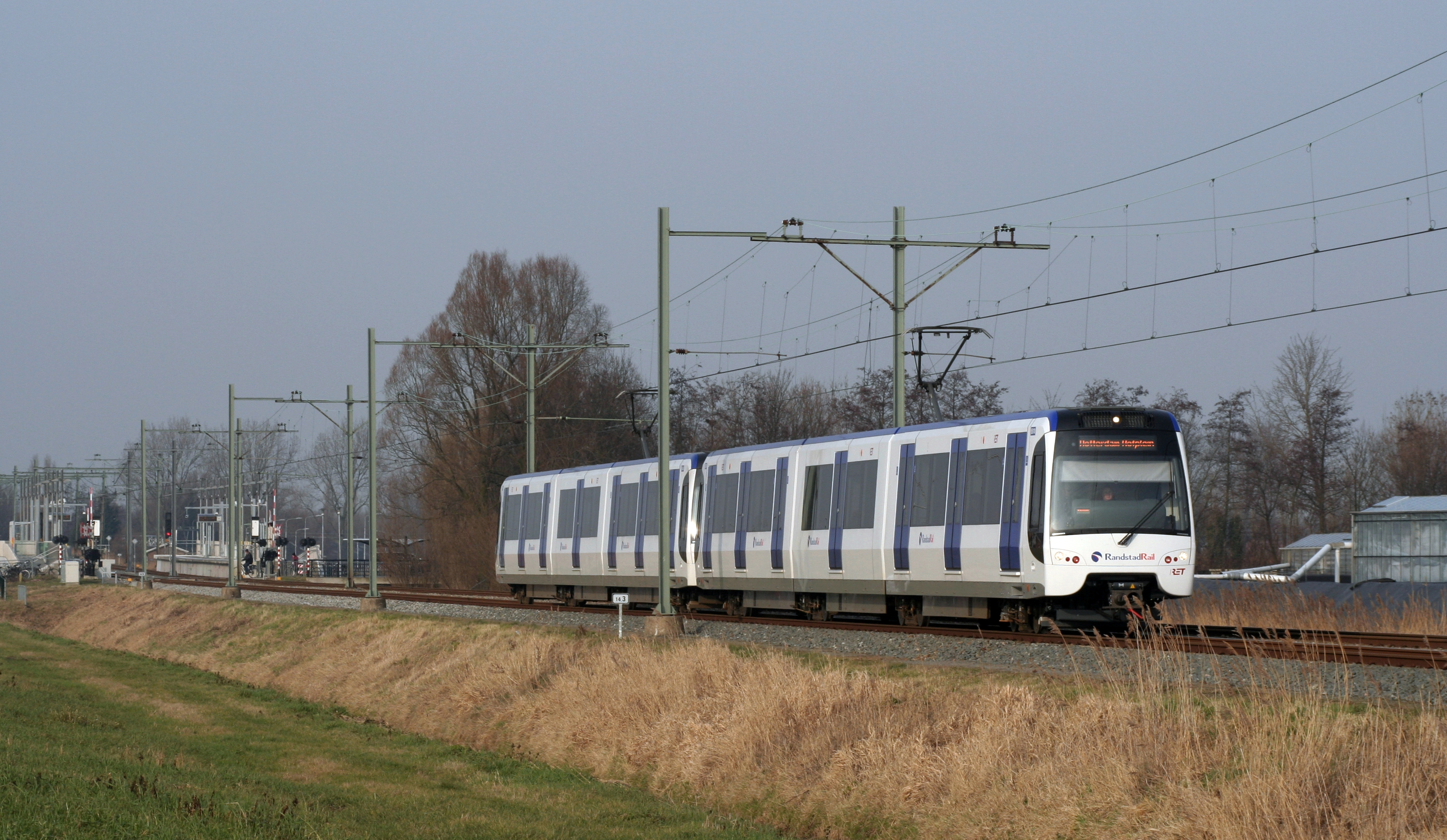
A new RET RandstadRail set, which replaced the Metro sets.
