= Monnickendamplein RandstadRail station =

Monnickendamplein
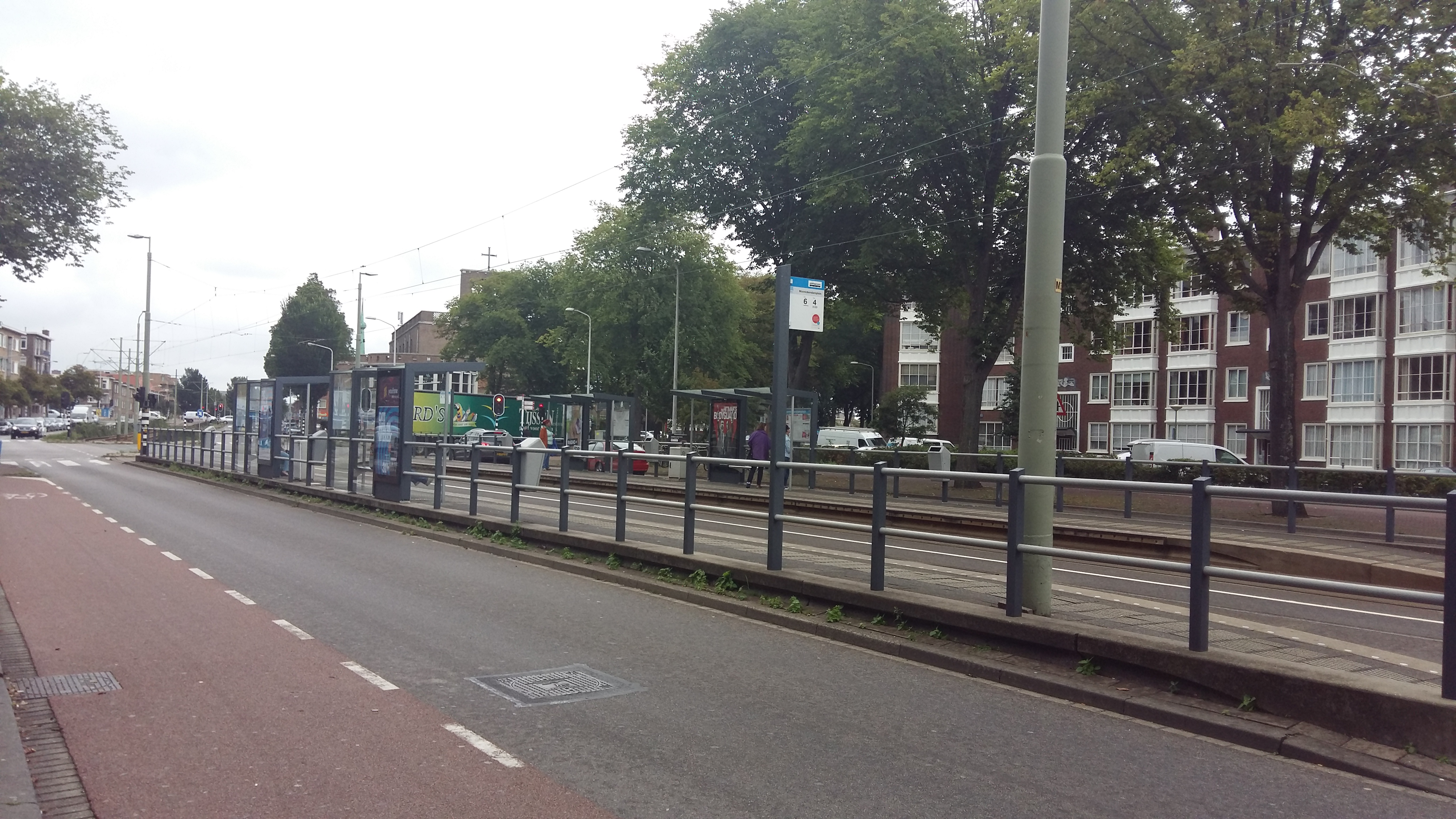

General information
- Location: Netherlands
- Coordinates: 52°03′43″N 4°16′14″E

Services
Preceding station	RandstadRail	Following station
Tienhovenselaan towards Lansingerland-Zoetermeer	Line 4 (HTM)	Leyenburg towards De Uithof
Location
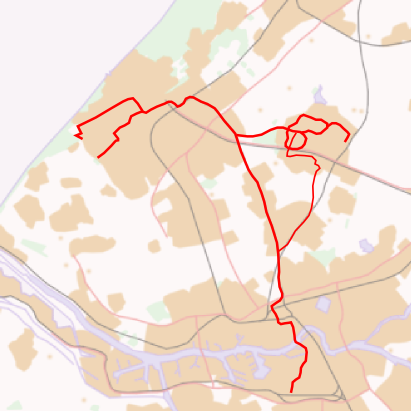
- Location within RandstadRail network

Monnickendamplein is a RandstadRail station in The Hague, Netherlands. It is a stop for RandstadRail line 4, tram line 6, and bus line 26, and is located on the Escamplaan. Passengers should change here between lines 4 and 6.

== RandstadRail services ==
The following services currently call at Monnickendamplein:

Service	Route	Material	Frequency
RR4	De Uithof - Beresteinaan - Bouwlustlaan - De Rade - Dedemsvaart - Zuidwoldepad- Leyenburg - Monnickendamplein - Tienhovenselaan - Dierenselaan - De La Reyweg - Monstersestraat - MCH Westeinde - Brouwersgracht - Grote Markt - Spui - Den Haag Centraal - Beatrixkwartier - Laan van NOI - Voorburg 't Loo - Leidschendam-Voorburg - Forepark - Leidschenveen - Voorweg (Low Level) - Centrum West - Stadhuis - Palenstein - Seghwaert - Willem Dreeslaan - Oosterheem - Javalaan	HTM RegioCitadis Tram	6x per hour (Monday - Saturday, Every 10 Minutes), 5x per hour (Sundays, Every 12 Minutes), 4x per hour (Evenings, after 8pm, Every 15 Minutes)

== Tram Services ==
Service	Operator	Route
6	HTM	MCH Antoniushove - Leidsenhage - Essesteijn - Station Mariahoeve - Aegonplein - Margarethaland - Hofzichtlaan - Vlamenburg - Reigersbergenweg - Carel Reinierszkade - Stuyvesantplein - Oostinje - Ternoot - Centraal Station - Spui - Grote Markt - Brouwersgracht - Om en Bij - Vaillantlaan - Hobbemaplein - Delftselaan - Paul Krugerplein - Nunspeetlaan - Tienhovenselaan - Monnickendamplein - Leyenburg

== Gallery ==
RandstadRail network map.

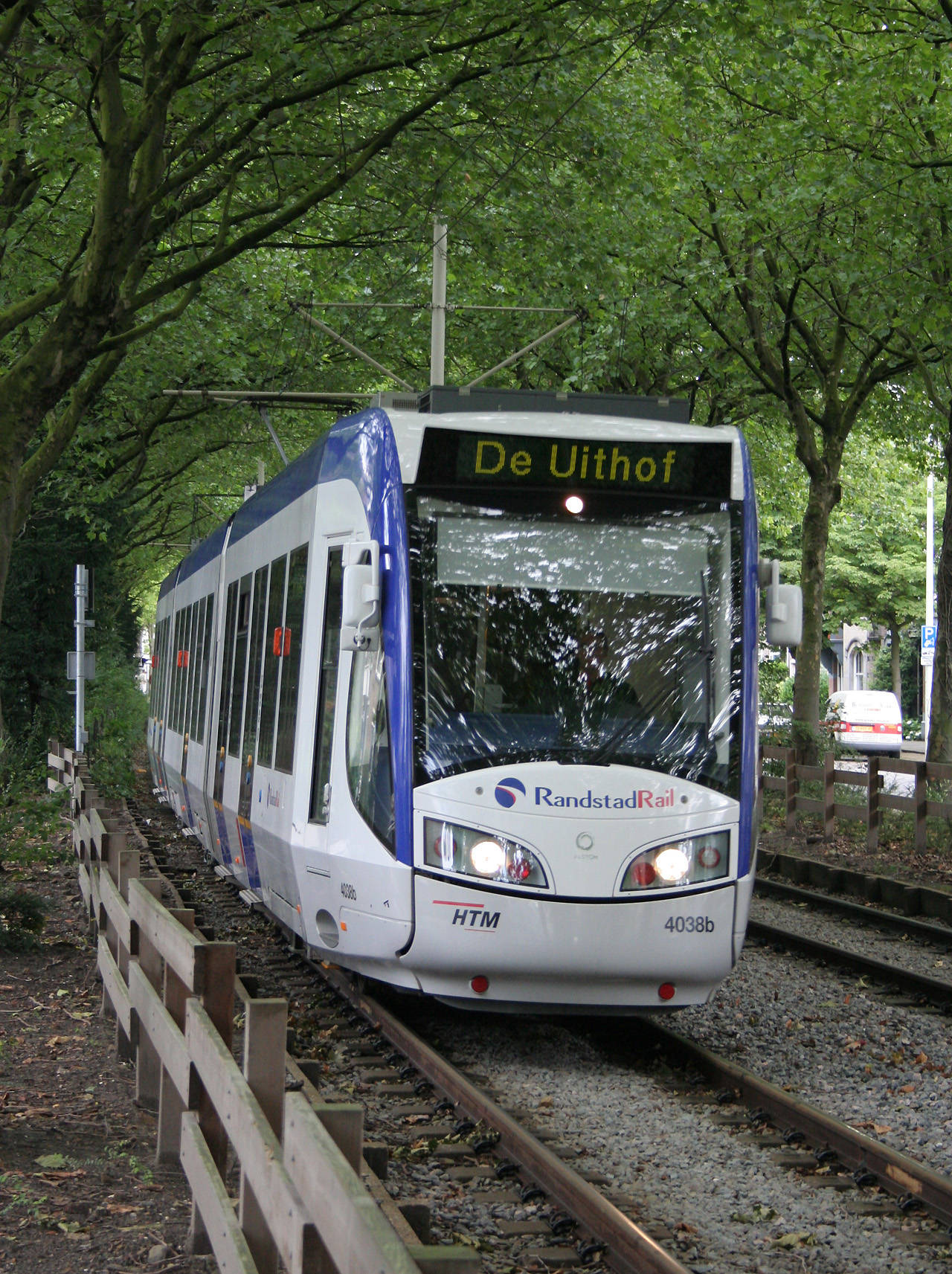
A RegioCitadis on RR4.

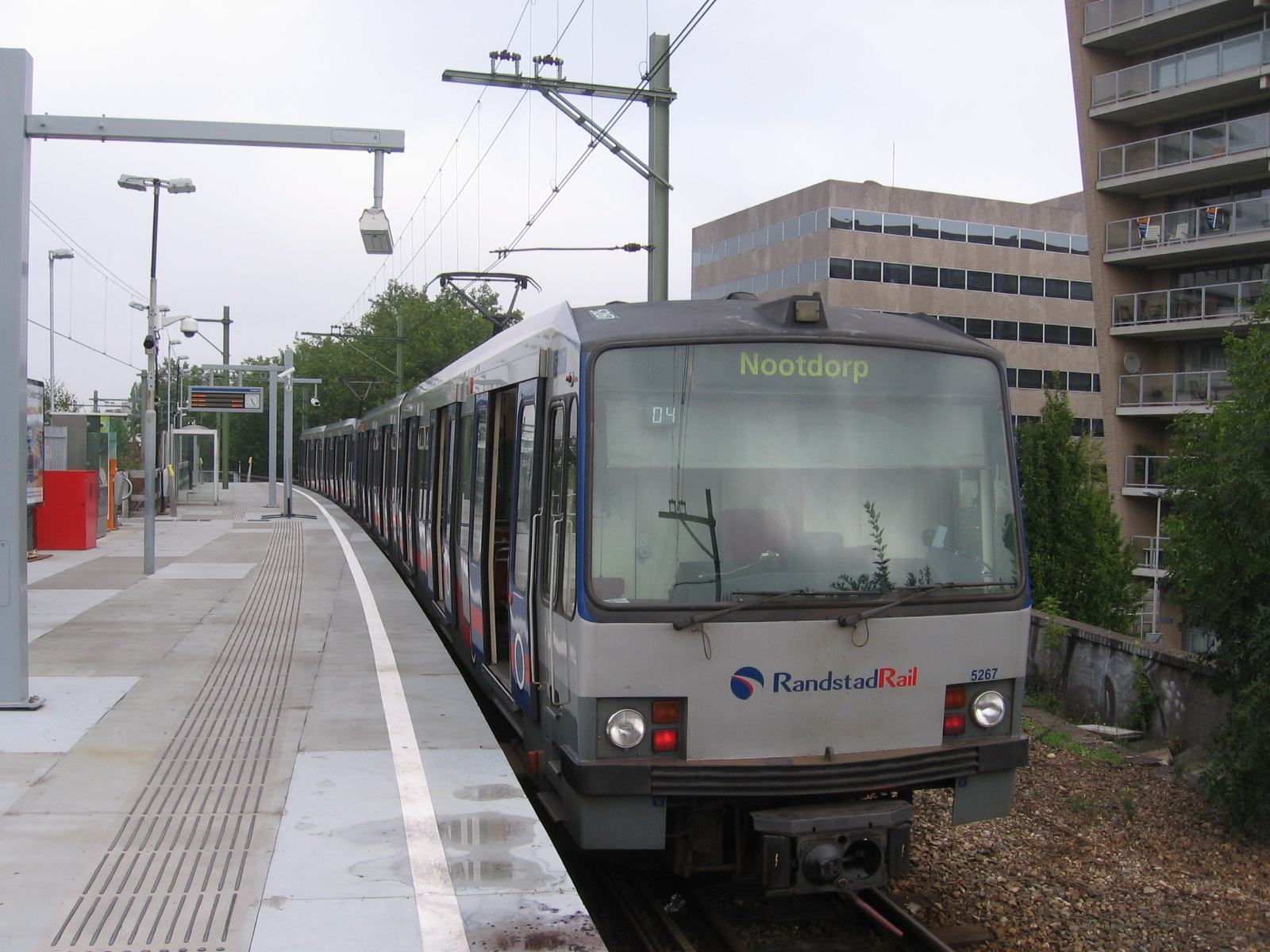
An RET Metro set that was converted for RandstadRail operation.

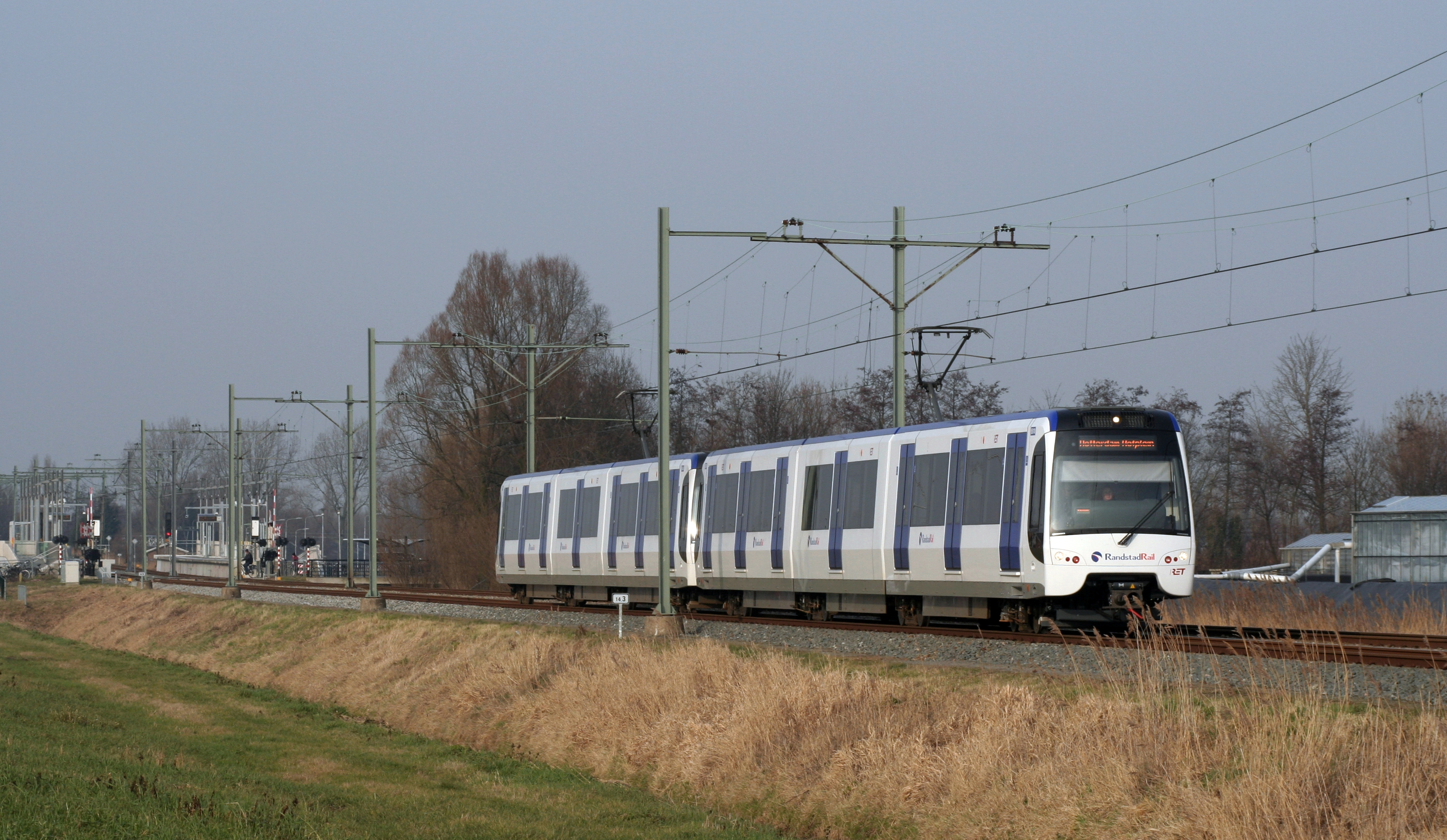
A new RET RandstadRail set, which replaced the Metro sets.
