= Lansingerland-Zoetermeer railway station =

Railway station in Zoetermeer, Netherlands

Lansingerland-Zoetermeer
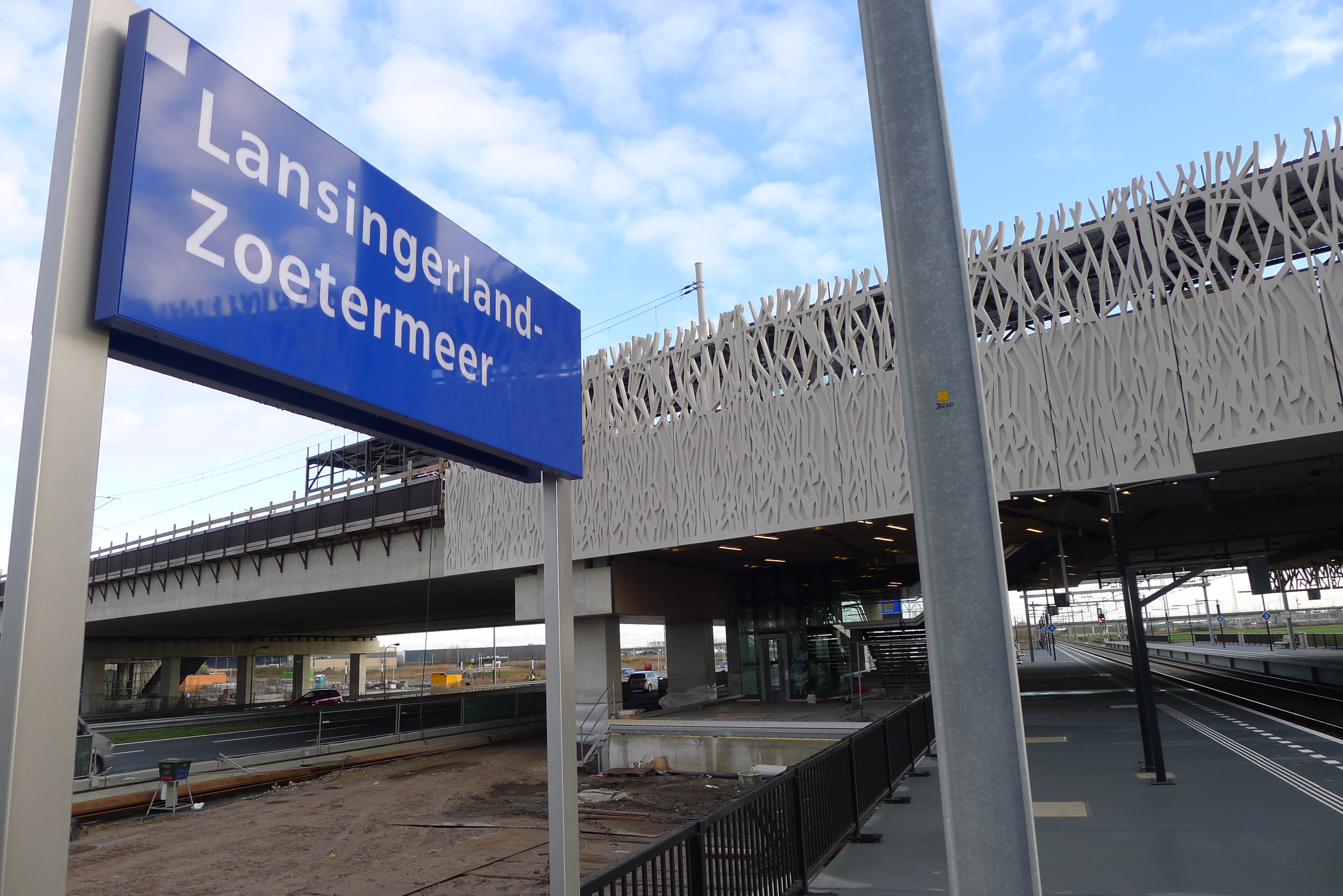
- Railway station Lansingerland-Zoetermeer in 2018

General information
- Location: Netherlands
- Coordinates: 52°02′22″N 4°31′32″E
- Line: Gouda–Den Haag railway
- Platforms: 2 side platforms
- Tracks: 2
- Connections: HTM Den Haag Tram: 4 EBS: 71, 73; RET: 170, 173; Arriva: 380, 381, 383, 384, 386

History
- Opened: 9 December 2018; 7 years ago, extension opened 19 May 2019; 7 years ago

Services
Preceding station	Nederlandse Spoorwegen	Following station
Zoetermeer Oost towards Den Haag Centraal	NS Sprinter 6000 After 18:00 and Fri-Sun	Gouda towards 's-Hertogenbosch
Zoetermeer Oost towards Den Haag Centraal	NS Sprinter 6800	Gouda towards Gouda Goverwelle
Zoetermeer Oost towards Den Haag Centraal	NS Sprinter 6900 Mon-Thur until 18:00	Gouda towards Tiel
Preceding station	RandstadRail	Following station
Terminus	Line 4 (HTM)	Van Tuyllpark towards De Uithof
Location
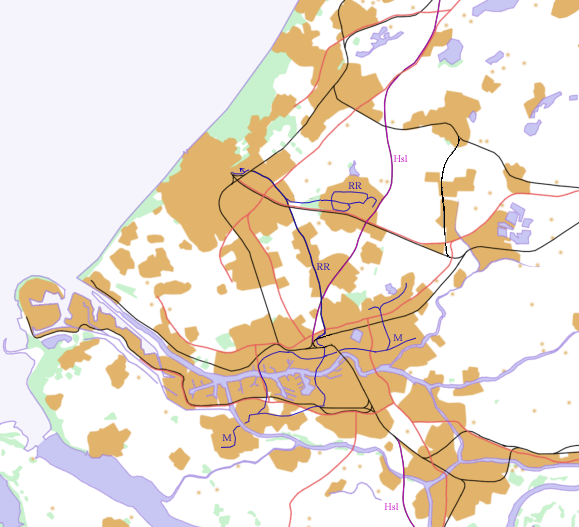
- Location within Southwest Randstad Location within Netherlands

Lansingerland-Zoetermeer railway station is a railway station on the borders of Bleiswijk and Zoetermeer, Netherlands. It was previously known under its conceptual name BleiZo. The train services are operated by Nederlandse Spoorwegen.

== History ==
The opening had been planned for 2014, but this was delayed until 2018 and the first train stopped at the station at 9 December 2018. RandstadRail extension opened at 19 May 2019.

The station lies on the Den Haag – Gouda line and is located between Zoetermeer Oost and Gouda railway stations. RandstadRail line 4 from The Hague De Uithof terminates over here.
