= Voorweg RandstadRail station =

Railway station in Zoetermeer, Netherlands

Voorweg

General information
- Location: Netherlands
- Coordinates: 52°03′46″N 4°28′15″E
- Platforms: 4 (2 low + 2 high)

History
- Opened: 22 May 1977; 49 years ago, reopened 29 October 2006; 19 years ago
- Closed: 3 June 2006; 20 years ago
Location
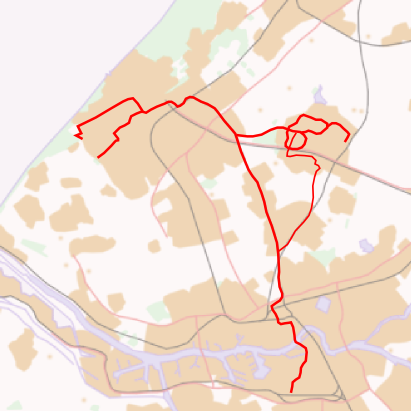
- Location within RandstadRail network

Voorweg is a RandstadRail station in Zoetermeer, Netherlands.

== History ==
The station opened as a railway station on 22 May 1977 as part of the Zoetermeerlijn, operating Zoetermeer Stadslijn services. The station closed on 3 June 2006 and reopened as a RandstadRail station on 29 October 2006, for the HTM tram services (4), and on 20 October 2007, for tram service 3.

The station features four platforms on two levels that are at right angles to each other. The bottom two are the tracks from The Hague, which have not yet entered the Zoetermeer circuit. The platforms are low and at the same level as the tram doors.

It is one of only two stations in the world in which the same metro line still passes through it twice in a pretzel configuration (the others being Monument Metro Station on the Tyne and Wear Metro in Newcastle-Upon-Tyne, England). A similar situation also existed between 2002 and 2016 in Canada on the Vancouver SkyTrain at Commercial–Broadway station and briefly on the Toronto subway, also in Canada, at Bloor-Yonge, for six months in 1966. Between 2012 and 2025, Serdika and Serdika II stations on the Sofia Metro in Sofia, Bulgaria also used this configuration.

Passengers can change at Voorweg for Meerzicht, Driemanspolder, Delftsewallen and Dorp to get to their destination faster.

== Local policy issues ==
The construction of parking facilities presented challenges for local government. In 2010, station Voorweg received special attention to enhance safety because it was perceived as one of the most scary places in the region.

== Services ==
The following services currently call at Voorweg:

Service	Route	Material	Frequency
RR3	Arnold Spoelplein - Pisuissestraat - Mozartlaan - Heliotrooplaan - Muurbloemweg - Hoefbladlaan - De Savornin Lohmanplein - Appelstraat - Zonnebloemstraat - Azaleaplein - Goudenregenstraat - Fahrenheitstraat - Valkenbosplein - Conradkade - Van Speijkstraat - Elandstraat - MCH Westeinde - Brouwersgracht - Grote Markt - Spui - Den Haag Centraal - Beatrixkwartier - Laan van NOI - Voorburg 't Loo - Leidschendam-Voorburg - Forepark - Leidschenveen - Voorweg (Low Level) - Centrum West - Stadhuis - Palenstein - Seghwaert - Leidsewallen - De Leyens - Buytenwegh - Voorweg (High Level) - Meerzicht - Driemanspolder - Delftsewallen - Dorp - Centrum West	HTM RegioCidatis Tram	6x per hour (Monday - Saturday, Every 10 Minutes), 5x per hour (Sundays, Every 12 Minutes), 4x per hour (Evenings, after 8pm, Every 15 Minutes)
RR4	De Uithof - Beresteinaan - Bouwlustlaan - De Rade - Dedemsvaart - Zuidwoldepad - Leyenburg - Monnickendamplein - Tienhovenselaan - Dierenselaan - De La Reyweg - Monstersestraat - MCH Westeinde - Brouwersgracht - Grote Markt - Spui - Den Haag Centraal - Beatrixkwartier - Laan van NOI - Voorburg 't Loo - Leidschendam-Voorburg - Forepark - Leidschenveen - Voorweg (Low Level) - Centrum West - Stadhuis - Palenstein - Seghwaert - Willem Dreeslaan - Oosterheem - Javalaan	HTM RegioCitadis Tram	6x per hour (Monday - Saturday, Every 10 Minutes), 5x per hour (Sundays, Every 12 Minutes), 4x per hour (Evenings, after 8pm, Every 15 Minutes)

Although RR3 stops at both levels, RR4 stops only at the lower level.

Preceding station	RandstadRail	Following station
Centrum West towards Centrum-West	Line 3 (HTM)	Leidschenveen towards Arnold Spoelplein
Meerzicht towards Centrum-West	Line 3 (HTM)	Buytenwegh towards Arnold Spoelplein
Centrum-West towards Lansingerland-Zoetermeer	Line 4 (HTM)	Leidschenveen towards De Uithof

== Gallery ==
RandstadRail Network Map

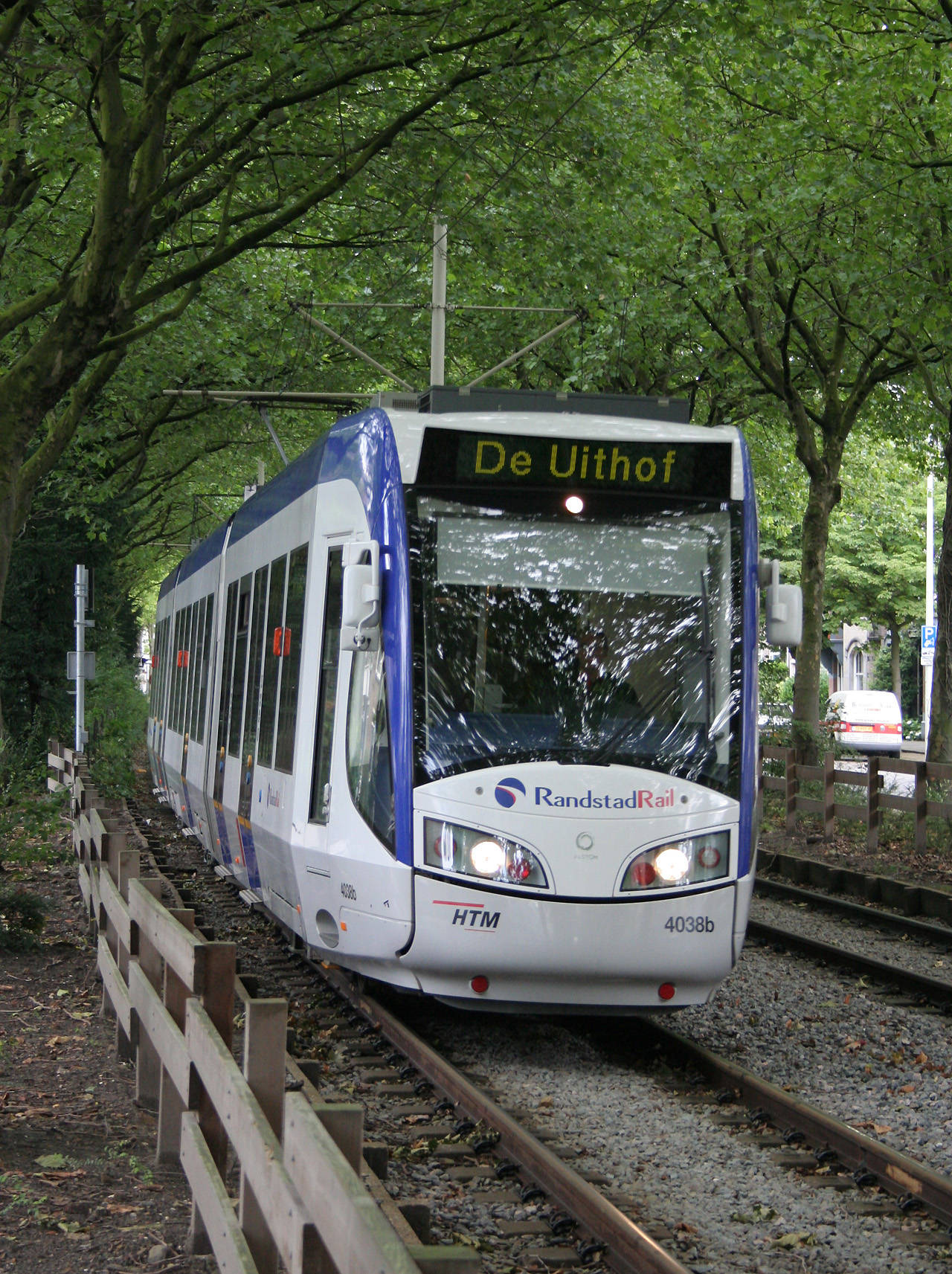
A RegioCitadis on RR4

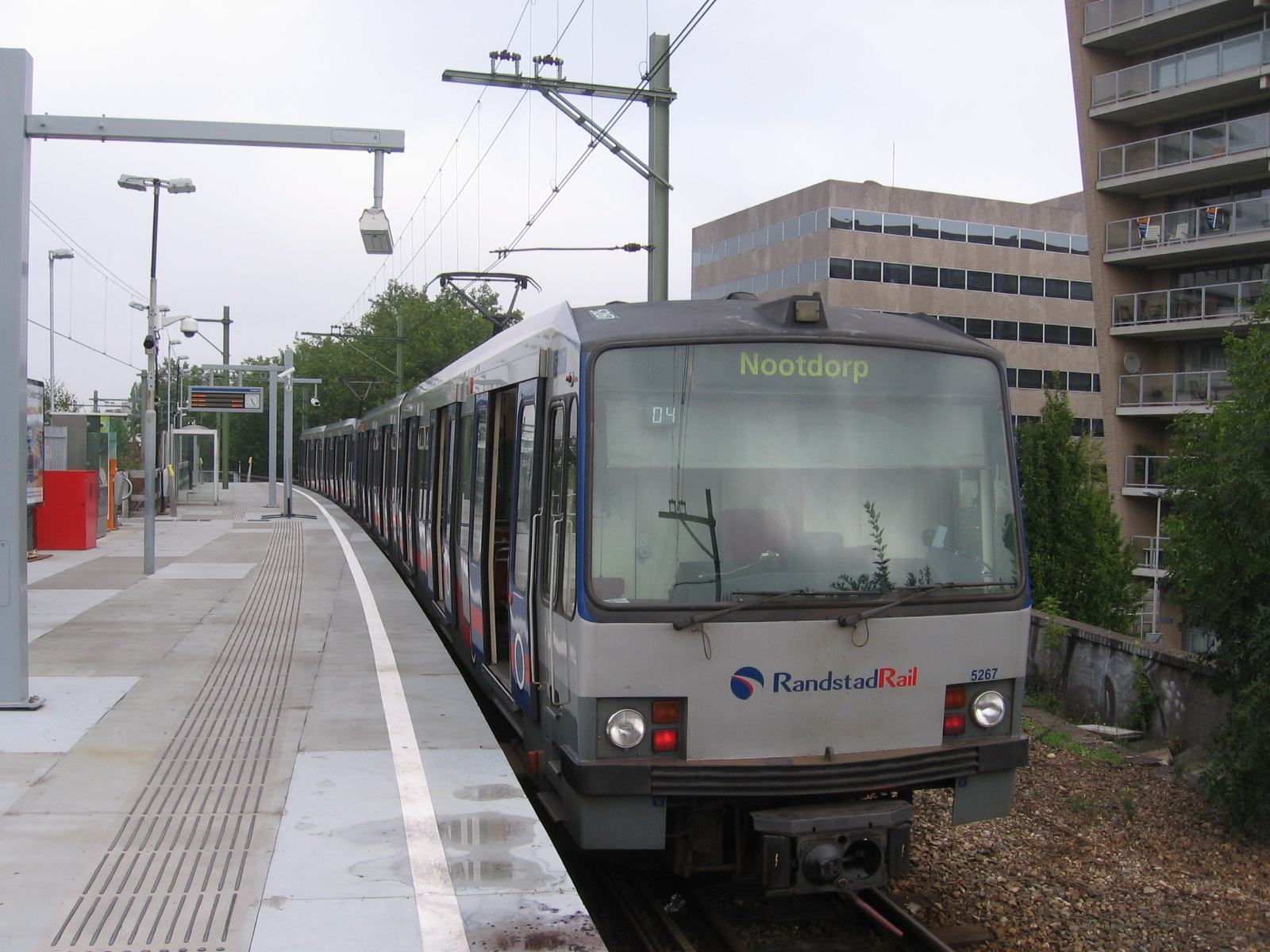
An RET Metro set that was converted for RandstadRail operation.

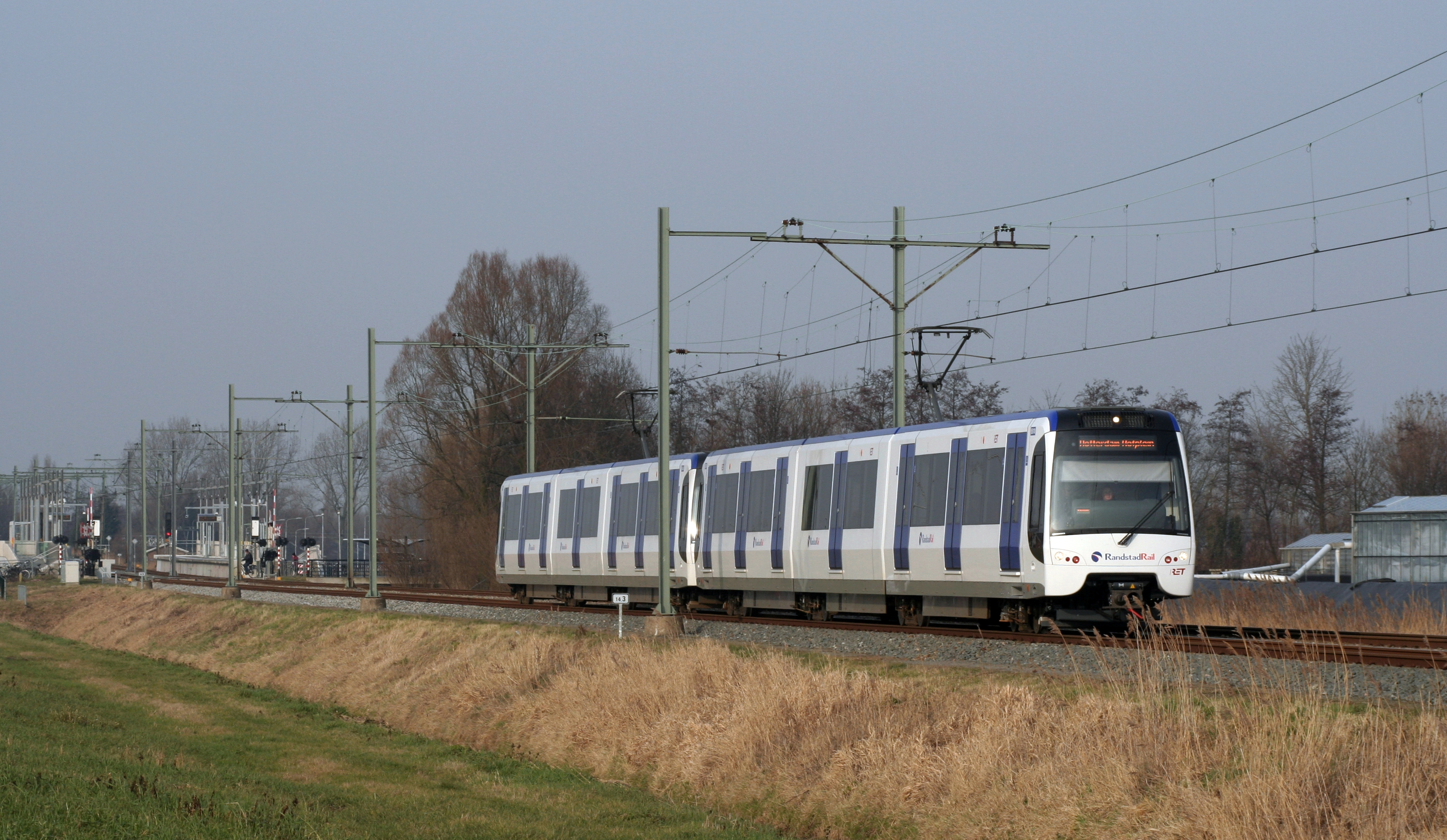
A new RET RandstadRail set, which replaced the Metro sets.

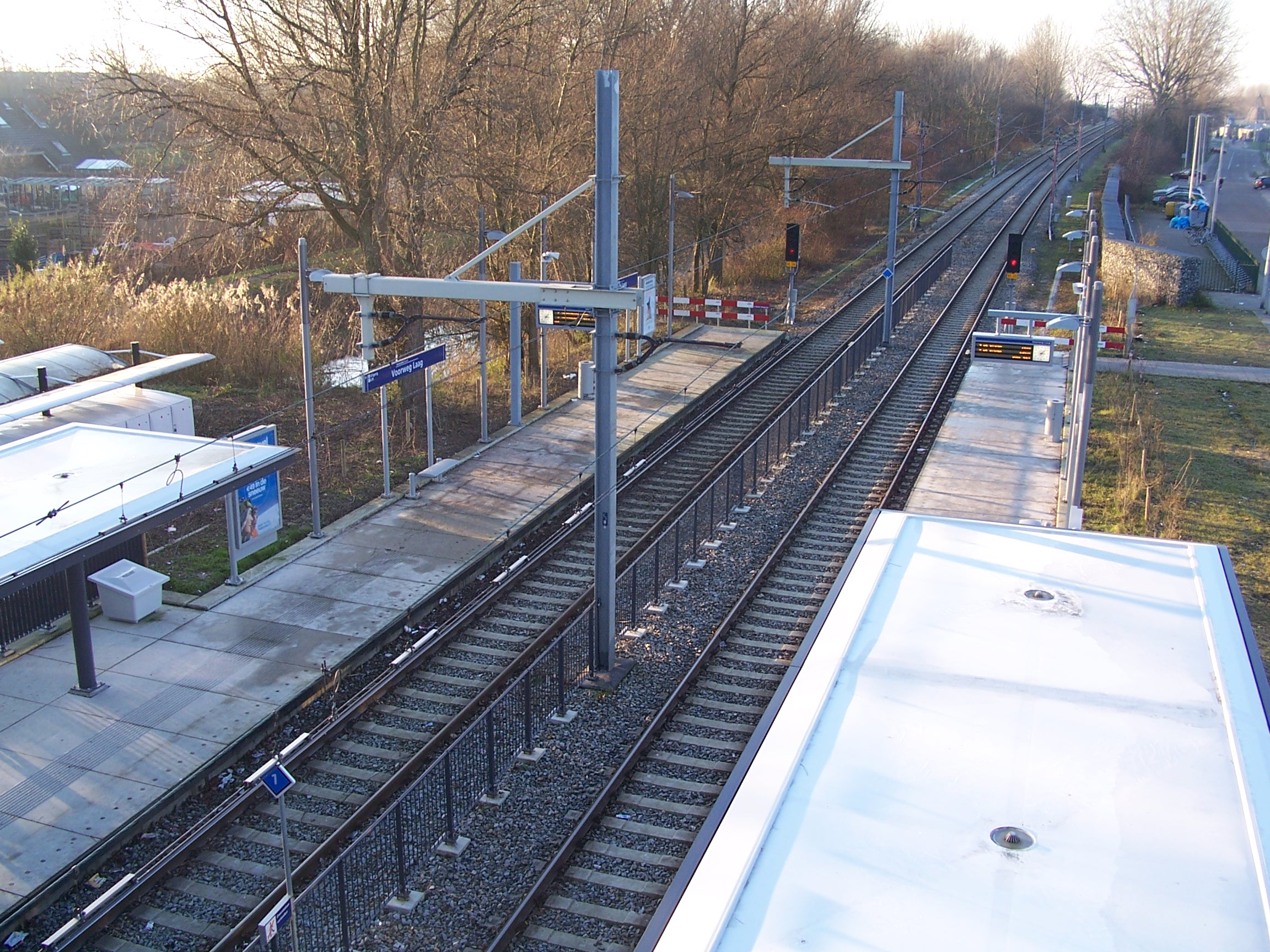
Station Voorweg Laag (Low Level (For Den Haag).

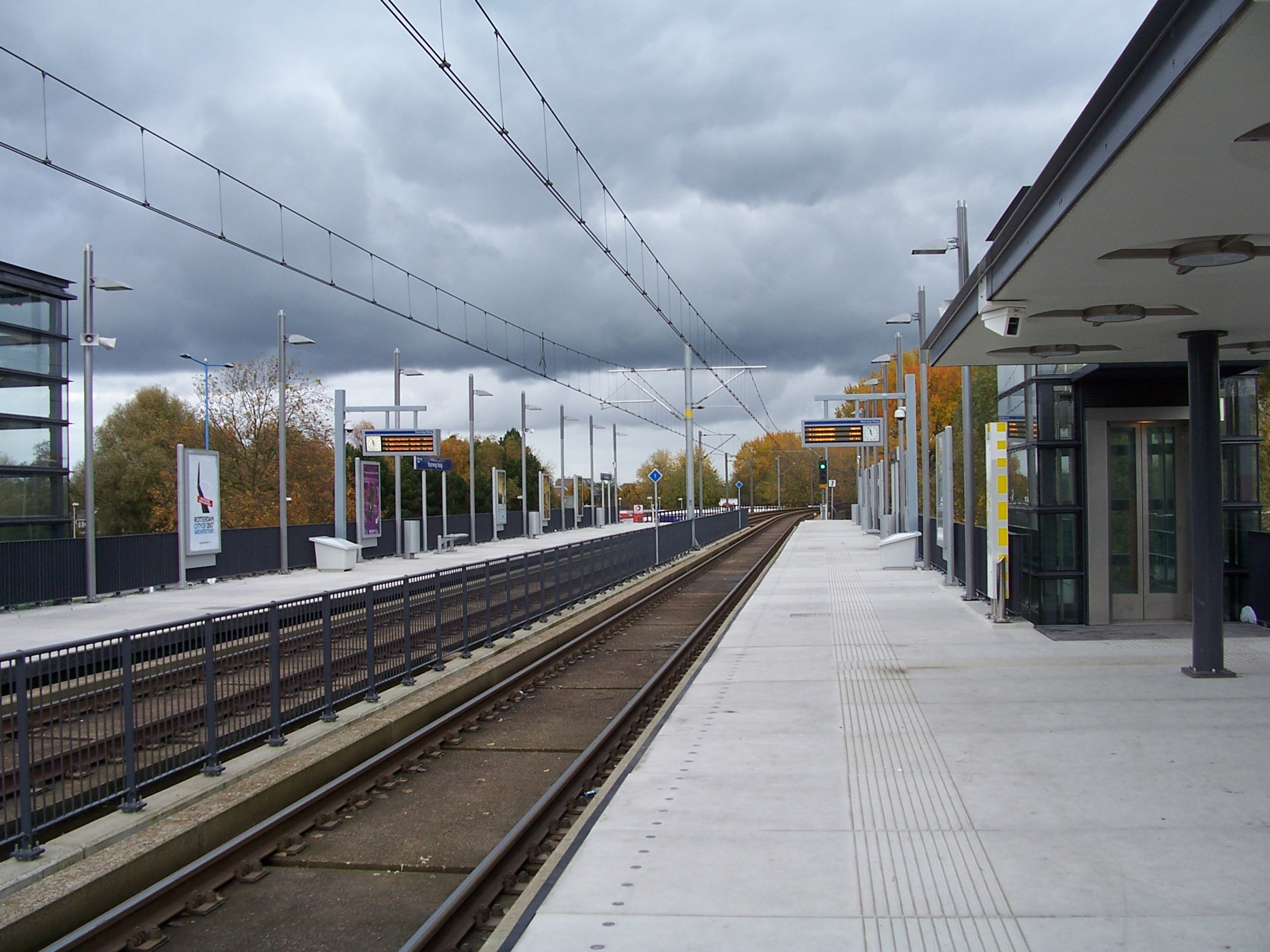
Station Voorweg Hoog (High Level (For Zoetermeer Stadslijn).
