= Spui (tram station) =

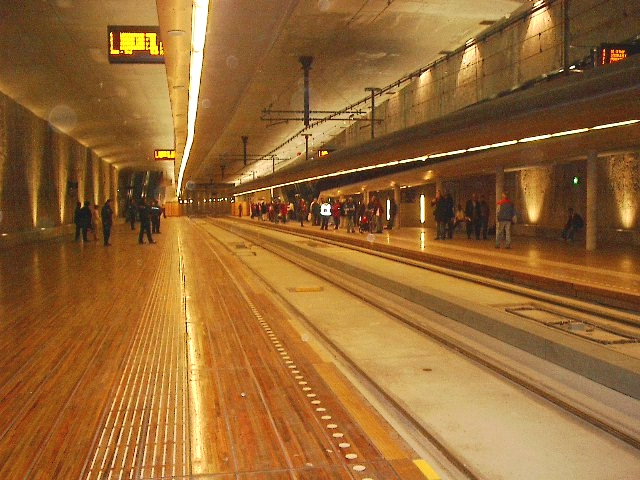

General information
- Location: Netherlands
- Coordinates: 52°04′38″N 4°18′51″E
- Platforms: 2

History
- Opened: 16 October 2004; 21 years ago

Services
Preceding station	RandstadRail	Following station
Den Haag Centraal towards Centrum-West	Line 3 (HTM)	Grote Markt towards Arnold Spoelplein
Den Haag Centraal towards Lansingerland-Zoetermeer	Line 4 (HTM)	Grote Markt towards De Uithof
Location
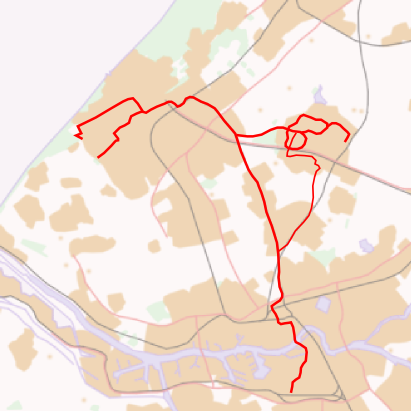
- Location within RandstadRail network

Spui is an underground tram station in central The Hague, Netherlands. Operated by RandstadRail, it opened on 16 October 2004 as part of the city's tram tunnel. RandstadRail lines 3 and 4, and tram lines 2 en 6 stop here. This station is not to be confused with the Spui/Stadhuis station.

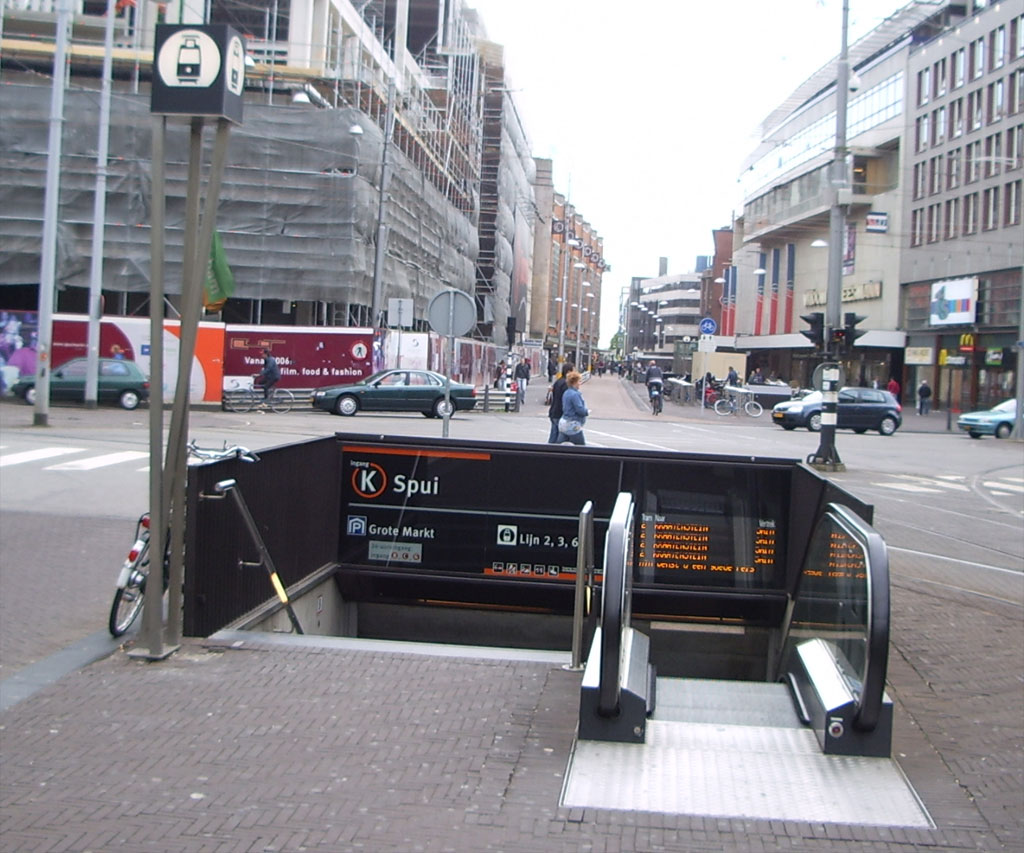
One of three entrances.

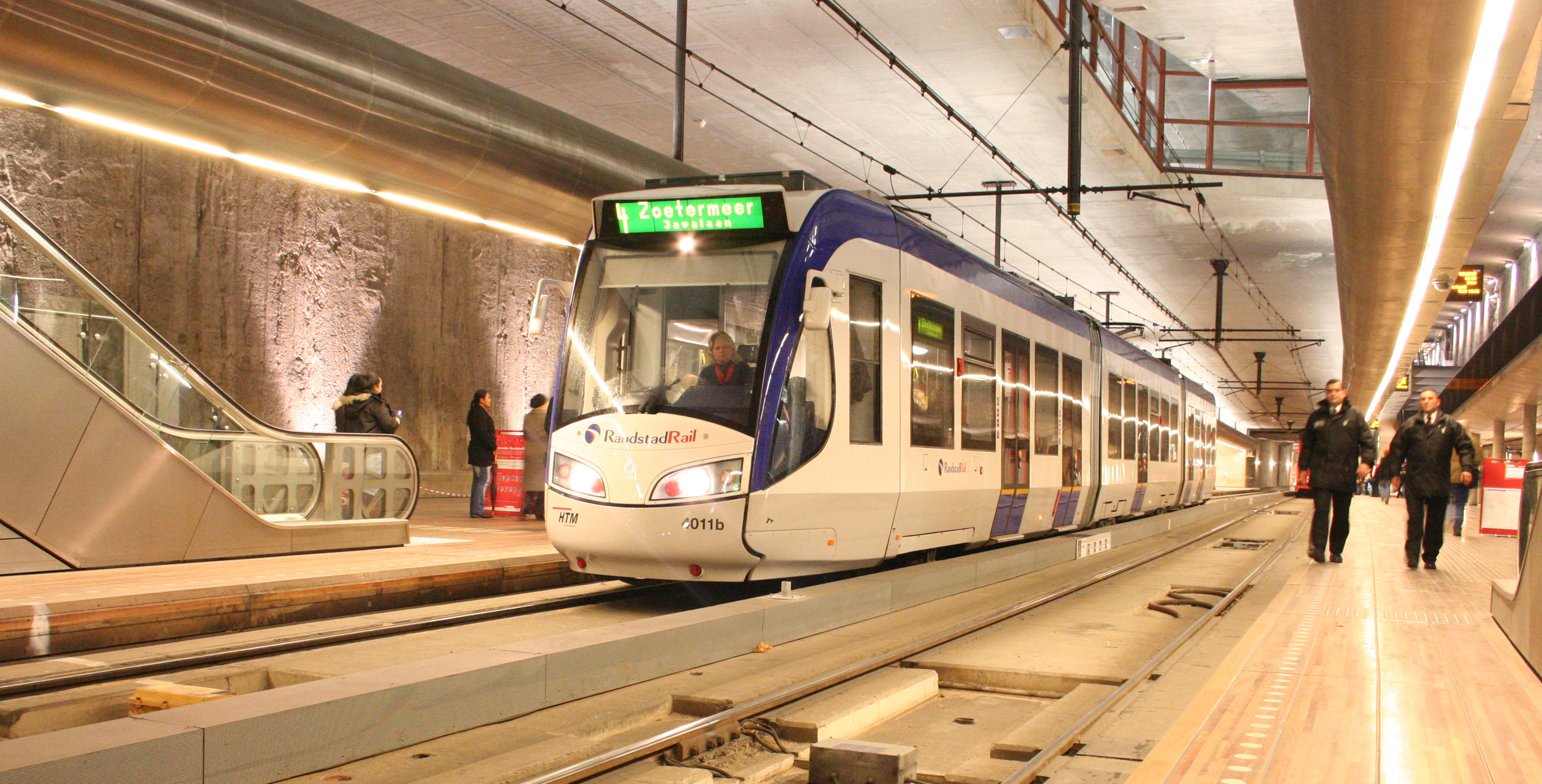
HTM's RegioCitadis calling at Spui.

== RandstadRail services ==
The following services currently call at Spui:

Service	Route	Material	Frequency
RR3	Arnold Spoelplein - Pisuissestraat - Mozartlaan - Heliotrooplaan - Muurbloemweg - Hoefbladlaan - De Savornin Lohmanplein - Appelstraat - Zonnebloemstraat - Azaleaplein - Goudenregenstraat - Fahrenheitstraat - Valkenbosplein - Conradkade - Van Speijkstraat - Elandstraat - HMC Westeinde - Brouwersgracht - Grote Markt - Spui - Den Haag Centraal - Beatrixkwartier - Laan van NOI - Voorburg 't Loo - Leidschendam-Voorburg - Forepark - Leidschenveen - Voorweg (Low Level) - Centrum-West - Stadhuis - Palenstein - Seghwaert - Leidsewallen - De Leyens - Buytenwegh - Voorweg (High Level) - Meerzicht - Driemanspolder - Delftsewallen - Dorp - Centrum-West	HTM RegioCidatis Tram	6x per hour (Monday - Saturday, Every 10 Minutes), 4x per hour (Sundays and evenings, after 7pm, Every 15 Minutes), 12x per hour (Workdays and sunday, rush hours, Every 5 minutes to De Savornin Lohmanplein/The Hague Central Station)
RR4	De Uithof - Beresteinaan - Bouwlustlaan - De Rade - Dedemsvaart - Zuidwoldepad - Leyenburg - Monnickendamplein - Tienhovenselaan - Dierenselaan - De la Reyweg - Monstersestraat - HMC Westeinde - Brouwersgracht - Grote Markt - Spui - Den Haag Centraal - Beatrixkwartier - Laan van NOI - Voorburg 't Loo - Leidschendam-Voorburg - Forepark - Leidschenveen - Voorweg (Low Level) - Centrum West - Stadhuis - Palenstein - Seghwaert - Willem Dreeslaan - Oosterheem - Javalaan - Van Tuyllpark - Lansingerland-Zoetermeer	HTM RegioCitadis Tram	6x per hour (Monday - Saturday, Every 10 Minutes), 4x per hour (Sundays and evenings, after 7pm, Every 15 Minutes), 12x per hour (Workdays, rush hours, Every 5 minutes to Monstersestraat/Zoetermeer)

== Tram Services ==
Service	Operator	Route
2	HTM	Kraayensteinlaan - Kapelaan Meereboerweg - Loosduinse Hoofdstraat - Burgemeester Hovylaan - Buitentuinen - Walnootstraat - Thorbeckelaan - Nieuwendamlaan - Laan van Eik en Duinen - Kamperfoeliestraat - Valkenboslaan - Fahrenheitstraat - De la Reyweg - Monstersestraat - HMC Westeinde - Brouwersgracht - Grote Markt - Spui - Centraal Station - Ternoot - Oostinje - Stuyvesantstraat - Station Laan van NOI - Bruijnings Ingenhoeslaan - Mgr. van Steelaan - Prinses Beatrixlaan - Voorburg 't Loo - Elzendreef - Essesteijn - Leidsenhage - HMC Antoniushove
6	HTM	Leyenburg - Monnickendamplein - Tienhovenselaan - Nunspeetlaan - Paul Krugerplein - Delftselaan - Haagse Markt - Vaillantlaan - Om en Bij - Brouwersgracht - Grote Markt - Spui - Centraal Station - Ternoot - Oostinje - Stuyvesantplein - Carel Reinierszkade - Reigersbergenweg - Vlamenburg - Hofzichtlaan - Margarethaland - Aegonplein - Station Mariahoeve - Essesteijn - Leidsenhage - Burgemeester Kolfschotenlaan - Kastelenring - Dillenburgsingel
