= Stadhuis RandstadRail station (Zoetermeer) =

Railway station in Zoetermeer, Netherlands

Stadhuis
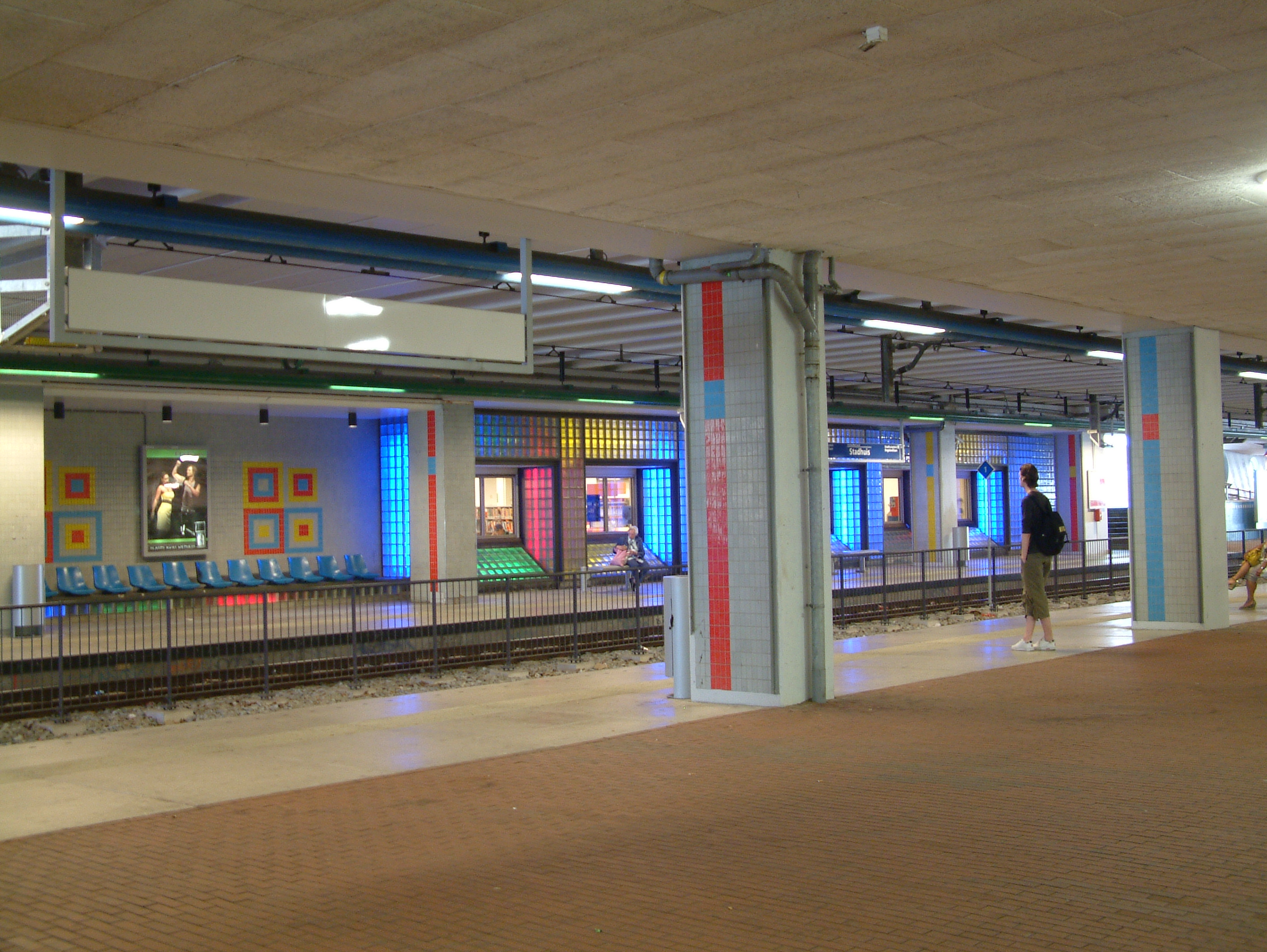
- General view of the station in 2008

General information
- Location: Netherlands
- Coordinates: 52°03′39″N 4°29′35″E
- Platforms: 2

History
- Opened: 22 May 1977; 49 years ago, reopened 29 October 2006; 19 years ago
- Closed: 3 June 2006; 20 years ago

Services
Preceding station	RandstadRail	Following station
Palenstein towards Centrum-West	Line 3 (HTM)	Centrum-West towards Arnold Spoelplein
Palenstein towards Lansingerland-Zoetermeer	Line 4 (HTM)	Centrum-West towards De Uithof
Location
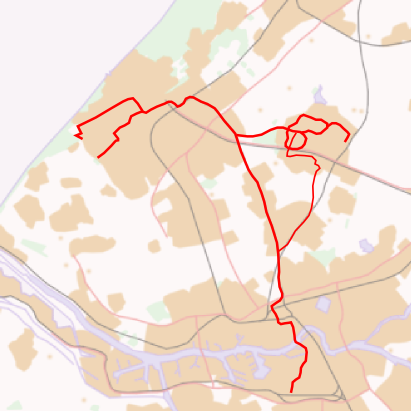
- Location within RandstadRail network

Stadhuis is a RandstadRail station in Zoetermeer, the Netherlands.

== History ==
The station opened, as a railway station, on 22 May 1977 as part of the Zoetermeerlijn, operating Zoetermeer Stadslijn services. The station was originally called Centrum Oost in connection with Centrum West station. However this name changed as it could confuse passengers between this station and Zoetermeer Oost station. The station building work didn't finish until 1985, and because of safety concerns, the station was again rebuilt in 1990 to let more sunlight in. The train station closed on 3 June 2006 and reopened as a RandstadRail station on 29 October 2006 for the HTM tram services (4), and on 20 October 2007 for tram service 3. The station was renovated in 2019.

The station features 2 underground platforms, located below Zoetermeer's town hall (Dutch: stadhuis). These platforms are low, and the same level as the tram doors, therefore making it step free.

== Train services ==
The following services currently call at Stadhuis:

Service	Route	Material	Frequency
RR3	Arnold Spoelplein - Pisuissestraat - Mozartlaan - Heliotrooplaan - Muurbloemweg - Hoefbladlaan - De Savornin Lohmanplein - Appelstraat - Zonnebloemstraat - Azaleaplein - Goudenregenstraat - Fahrenheitstraat - Valkenbosplein - Conradkade - Van Speijkstraat - Elandstraat - MCH Westeinde - Brouwersgracht - Grote Markt - Spui - Den Haag Centraal - Beatrixkwartier - Laan van NOI - Voorburg 't Loo - Leidschendam-Voorburg - Forepark - Leidschenveen - Voorweg (Low Level) - Centrum West - Stadhuis - Palenstein - Seghwaert - Leidsewallen - De Leyens - Buytenwegh - Voorweg (High Level) - Meerzicht - Driemanspolder - Delftsewallen - Dorp - Centrum West	HTM RegioCidatis Tram	6x per hour (Monday - Saturday, Every 10 Minutes), 5x per hour (Sundays, Every 12 Minutes), 4x per hour (Evenings, after 8pm, Every 15 Minutes)
RR4	De Uithof - Beresteinaan - Bouwlustlaan - De Rade - Dedemsvaart - Zuidwoldepad - Leyenburg - Monnickendamplein - Tienhovenselaan - Dierenselaan - De La Reyweg - Monstersestraat - MCH Westeinde - Brouwersgracht - Grote Markt - Spui - Den Haag Centraal - Beatrixkwartier - Laan van NOI - Voorburg 't Loo - Leidschendam-Voorburg - Forepark - Leidschenveen - Voorweg (Low Level) - Centrum West - Stadhuis - Palenstein - Seghwaert - Willem Dreeslaan - Oosterheem - Javalaan	HTM RegioCitadis Tram	6x per hour (Monday - Saturday, Every 10 Minutes), 5x per hour (Sundays, Every 12 Minutes), 4x per hour (Evenings, after 8pm, Every 15 Minutes)

== Gallery ==
RandstadRail Network Map

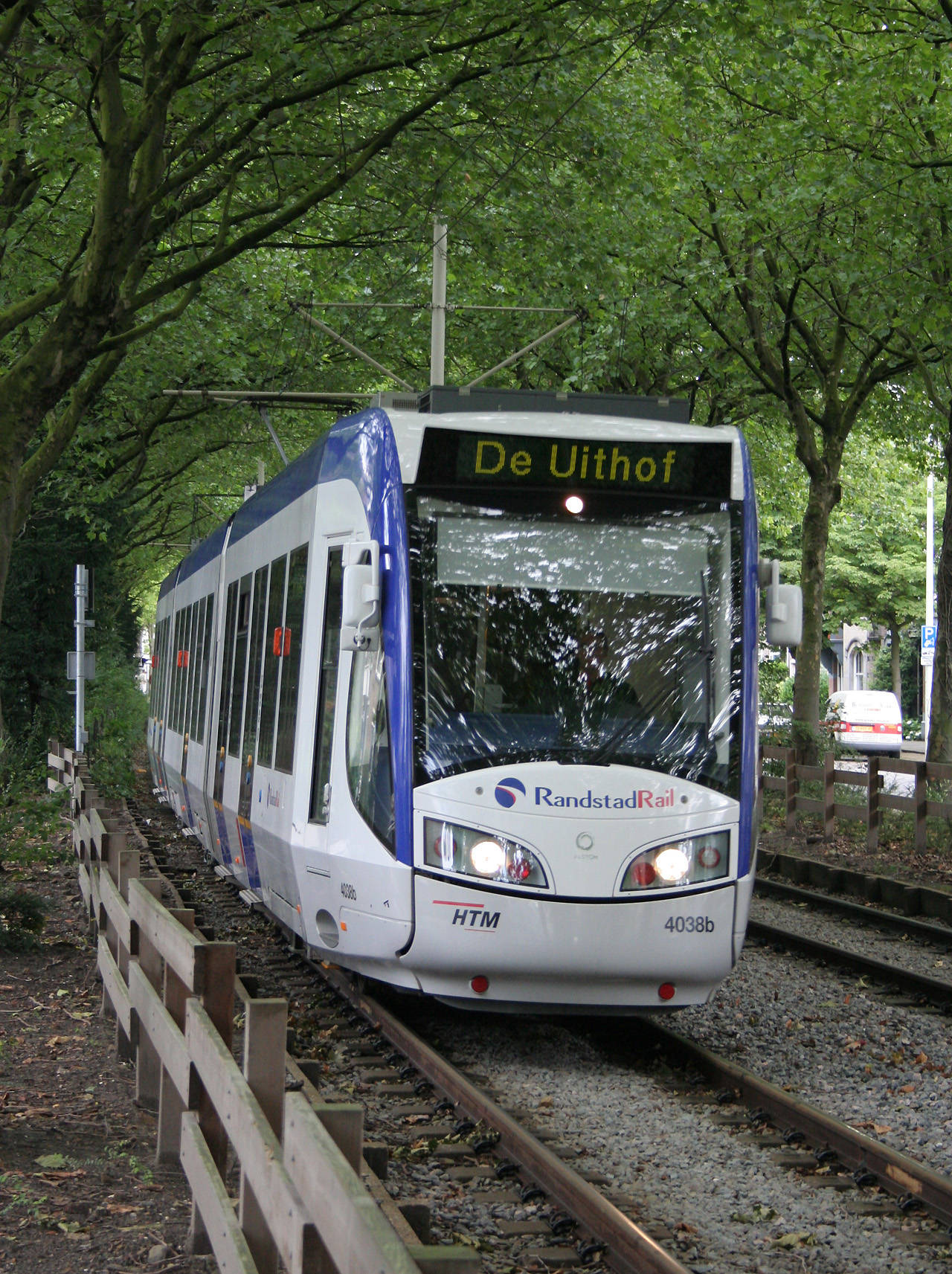
A RegioCitadis on RR4

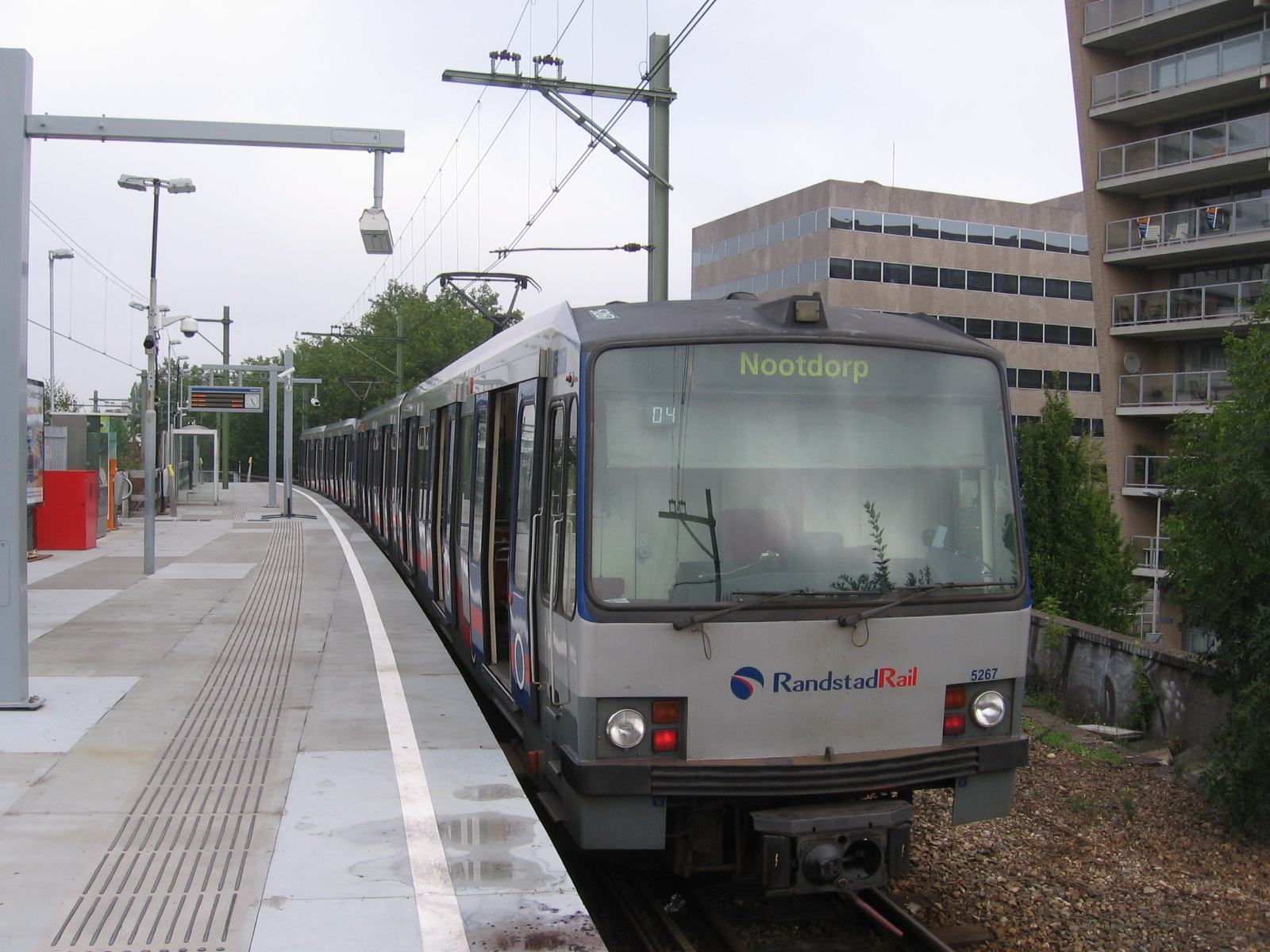
An RET Metro set that was converted for RandstadRail operation.

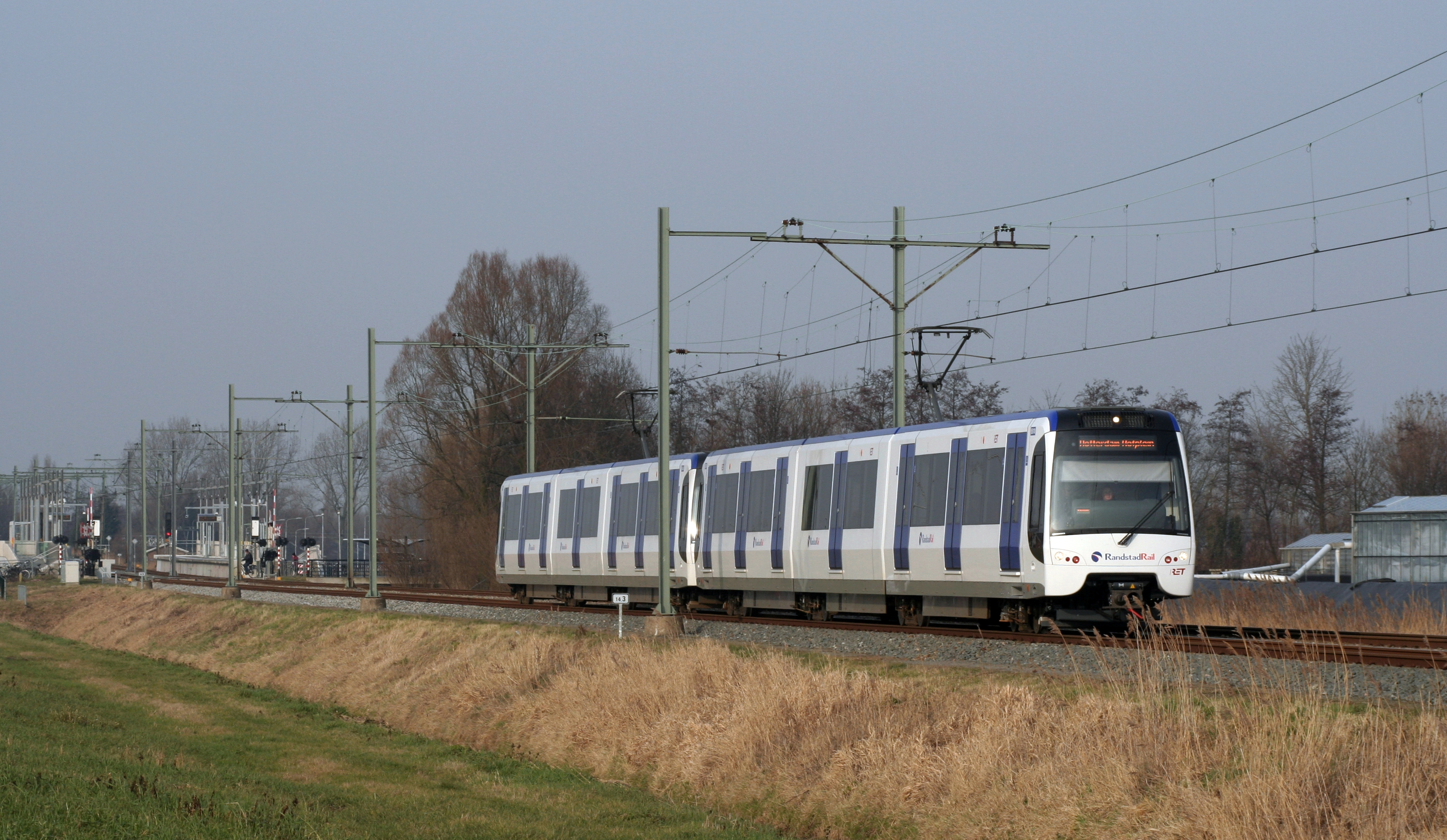
A new RET RandstadRail set, which replaced the Metro sets.

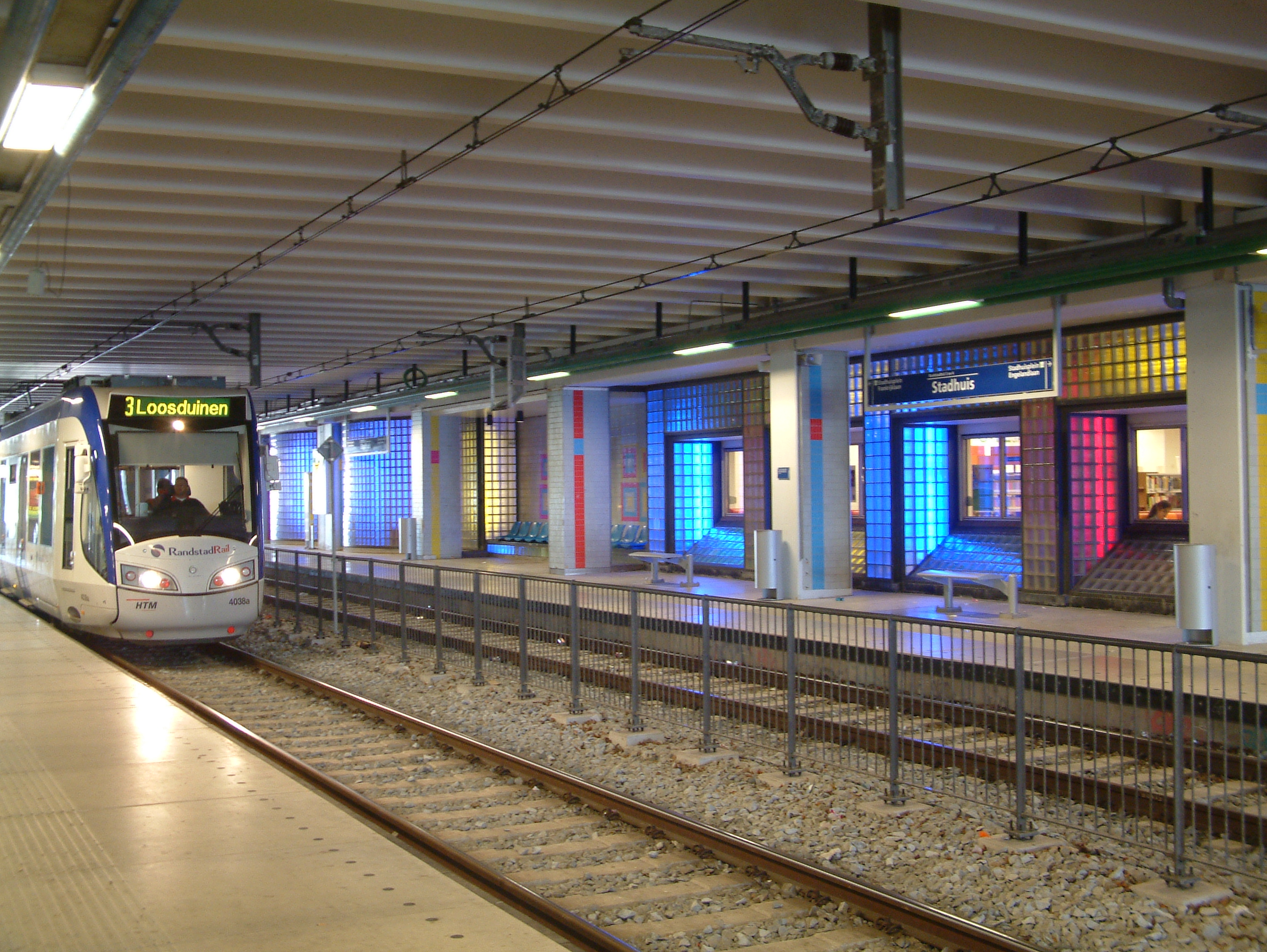
An RR3 at the station heading towards Den Haag.
