= Grote Markt RandstadRail station =

RandstadRail station and tram stop in The Hague

Grote Markt
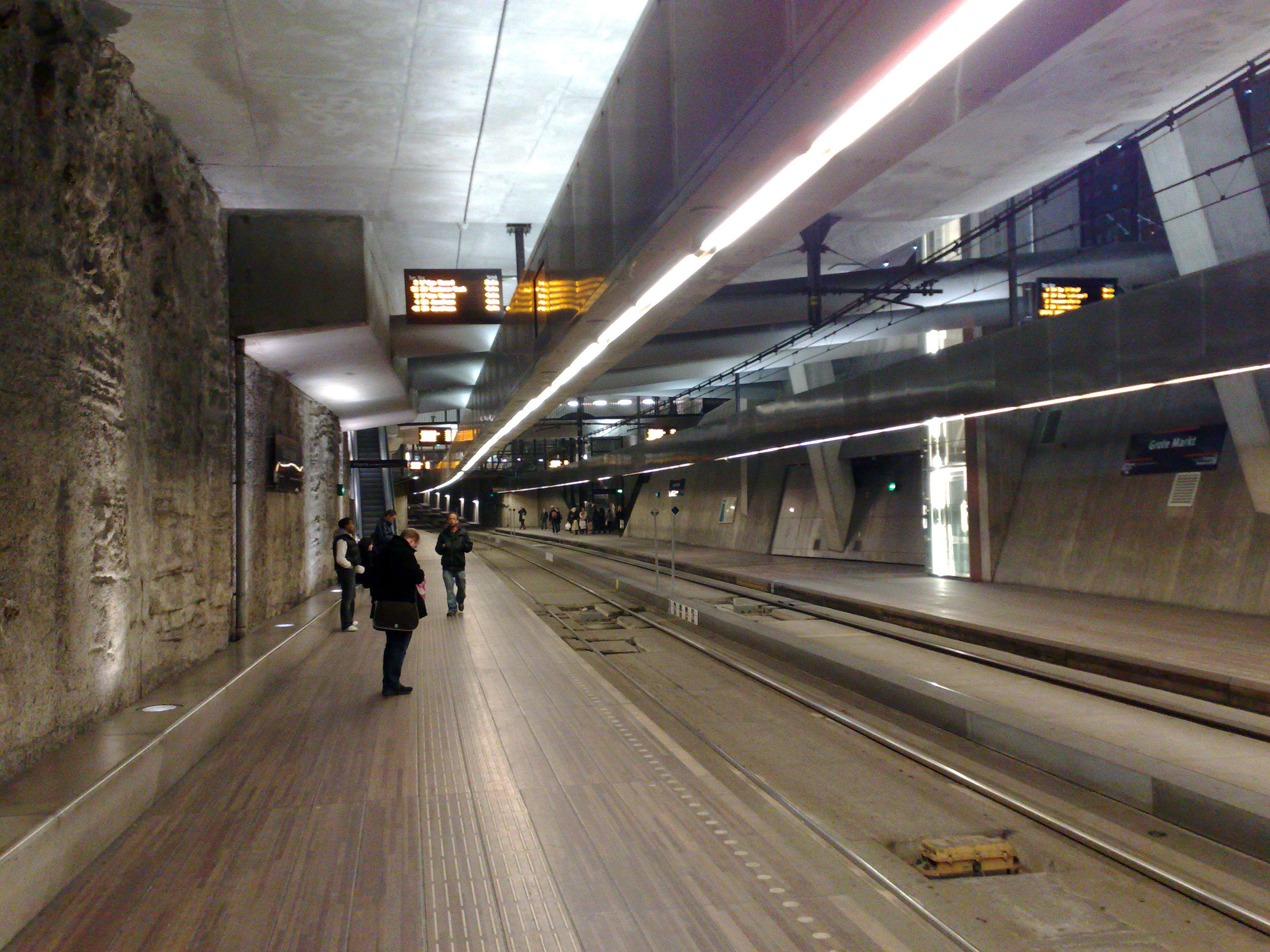
- The tram tunnel

General information
- Location: Netherlands
- Coordinates: 52°04′30″N 4°18′32″E
- Platforms: 2

History
- Opened: 16 October 2004; 21 years ago

Services
Preceding station	RandstadRail	Following station
Spui towards Centrum-West	Line 3 (HTM)	Brouwersgracht towards Arnold Spoelplein
Spui towards Lansingerland-Zoetermeer	Line 4 (HTM)	Brouwersgracht towards De Uithof
Location
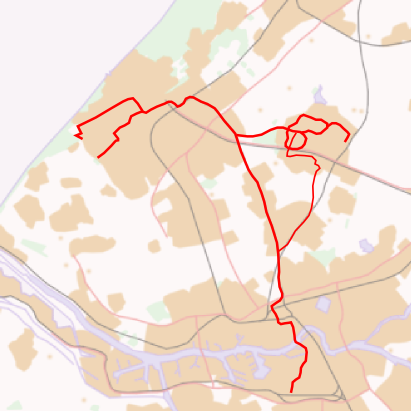
- Location within RandstadRail network

Grote Markt is a RandstadRail station in central The Hague, Netherlands. It opened on 16 October 2004 as part of The Hague's new tram tunnel. The station is near by the Grote Marktstraat where's the main shopping centre from The Hague.

== RandstadRail services ==
The following services currently call at Grote Markt:

Service	Route	Material	Frequency
RR3	Arnold Spoelplein - Pisuissestraat - Mozartlaan - Heliotrooplaan - Muurbloemweg - Hoefbladlaan - De Savornin Lohmanplein - Appelstraat - Zonnebloemstraat - Azaleaplein - Goudenregenstraat - Fahrenheitstraat - Valkenbosplein - Conradkade - Van Speijkstraat - Elandstraat - HMC Westeinde - Brouwersgracht - Grote Markt - Spui - Den Haag Centraal - Beatrixkwartier - Laan van NOI - Voorburg 't Loo - Leidschendam-Voorburg - Forepark - Leidschenveen - Voorweg (Low Level) - Centrum-West - Stadhuis - Palenstein - Seghwaert - Leidsewallen - De Leyens - Buytenwegh - Voorweg (High Level) - Meerzicht - Driemanspolder - Delftsewallen - Dorp - Centrum-West	HTM RegioCidatis Tram	6x per hour (Monday - Saturday, Every 10 Minutes), 4x per hour (Sundays and evenings, after 7pm, Every 15 Minutes), 12x per hour (Workdays and Sunday, rush hours, Every 5 minutes to De Savornin Lohmanplein/The Hague Central Station)
RR4	De Uithof - Beresteinaan - Bouwlustlaan - De Rade - Dedemsvaart - Zuidwoldepad - Leyenburg - Monnickendamplein - Tienhovenselaan - Dierenselaan - De la Reyweg - Monstersestraat - HMC Westeinde - Brouwersgracht - Grote Markt - Spui - Den Haag Centraal - Beatrixkwartier - Laan van NOI - Voorburg 't Loo - Leidschendam-Voorburg - Forepark - Leidschenveen - Voorweg (Low Level) - Centrum West - Stadhuis - Palenstein - Seghwaert - Willem Dreeslaan - Oosterheem - Javalaan - Van Tuyllpark - Lansingerland-Zoetermeer	HTM RegioCitadis Tram	6x per hour (Monday - Saturday, Every 10 Minutes), 4x per hour (Sundays and evenings, after 7pm, Every 15 Minutes), 12x per hour (Workdays, rush hours, Every 5 minutes to Monstersestraat/Zoetermeer)

== Tram Services ==
Service	Operator	Route
2	HTM	Kraayensteinlaan - Kapelaan Meereboerweg - Loosduinse Hoofdstraat - Burgemeester Hovylaan - Buitentuinen - Walnootstraat - Thorbeckelaan - Nieuwendamlaan - Laan van Eik en Duinen - Kamperfoeliestraat - Valkenboslaan - Fahrenheitstraat - De la Reyweg - Monstersestraat - HMC Westeinde - Brouwersgracht - Grote Markt - Spui - Centraal Station - Ternoot - Oostinje - Stuyvesantstraat - Station Laan van NOI - Bruijnings Ingenhoeslaan - Mgr. van Steelaan - Prinses Beatrixlaan - Voorburg 't Loo - Elzendreef - Essesteijn - Leidsenhage - HMC Antoniushove
6	HTM	Leyenburg - Monnickendamplein - Tienhovenselaan - Nunspeetlaan - Paul Krugerplein - Delftselaan - Haagse Markt - Vaillantlaan - Om en Bij - Brouwersgracht - Grote Markt - Spui - Centraal Station - Ternoot - Oostinje - Stuyvesantplein - Carel Reinierszkade - Reigersbergenweg - Vlamenburg - Hofzichtlaan - Margarethaland - Aegonplein - Station Mariahoeve - Essesteijn - Leidsenhage - Burgemeester Kolfschotenlaan - Kastelenring - Dillenburgsingel

== Bus services ==
- 25 (Grote Markt - Vrederust)
- 51 (Grote Markt - Rijswijk - Delft railway station

== Gallery ==
RandstadRail Network Map

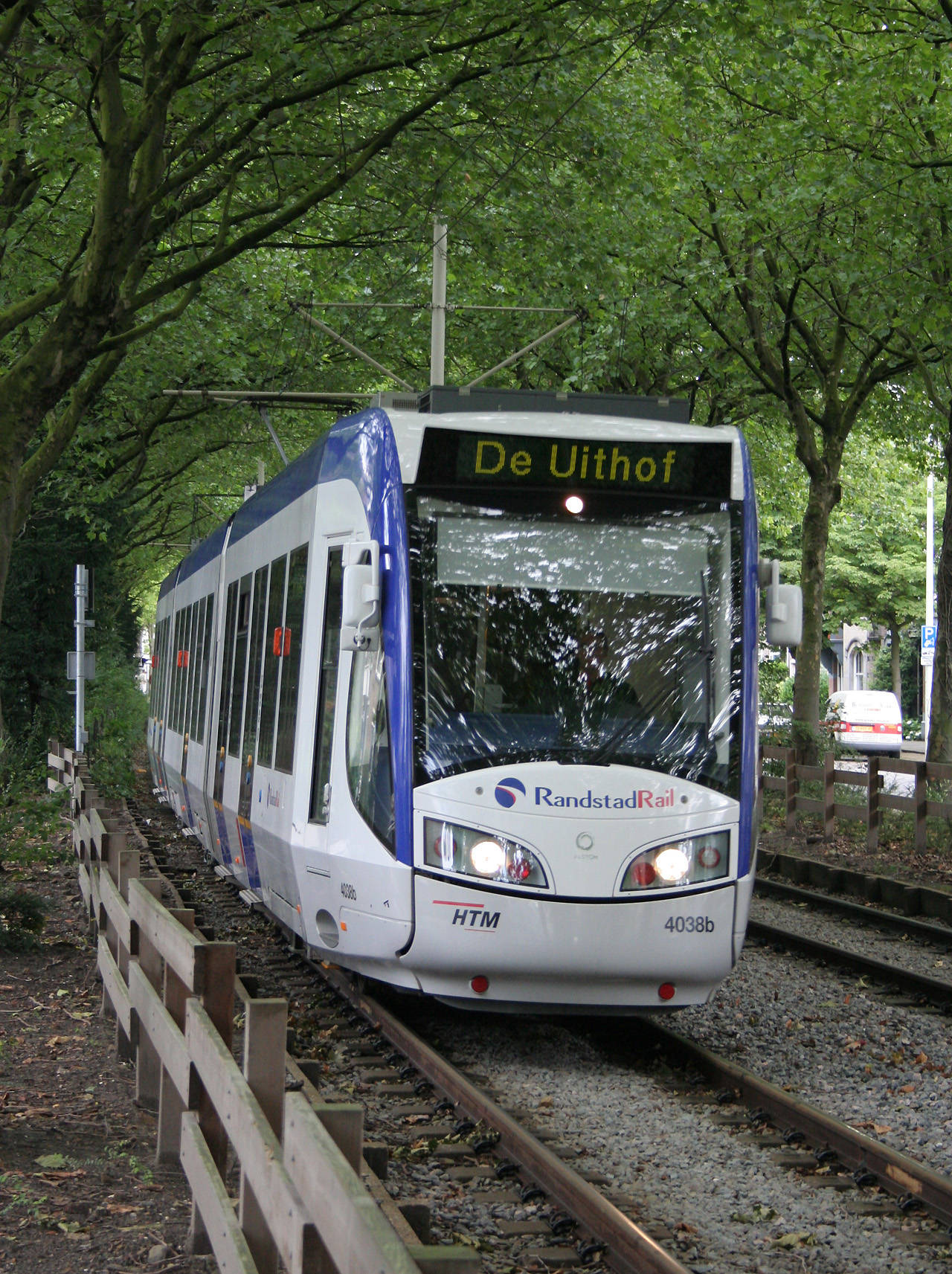
A RegioCitadis on RR4

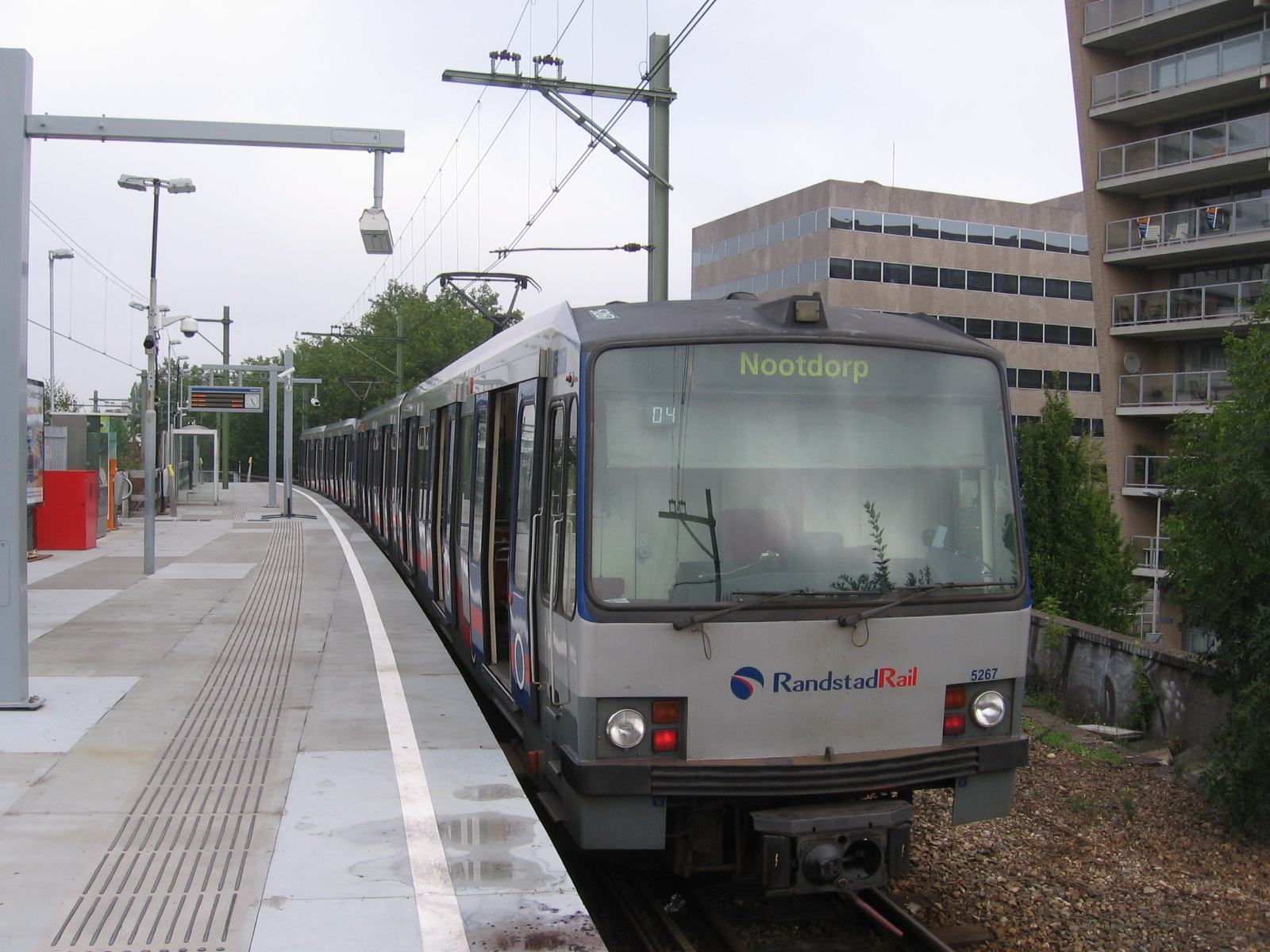
An RET Metro set that was converted for RandstadRail operation.

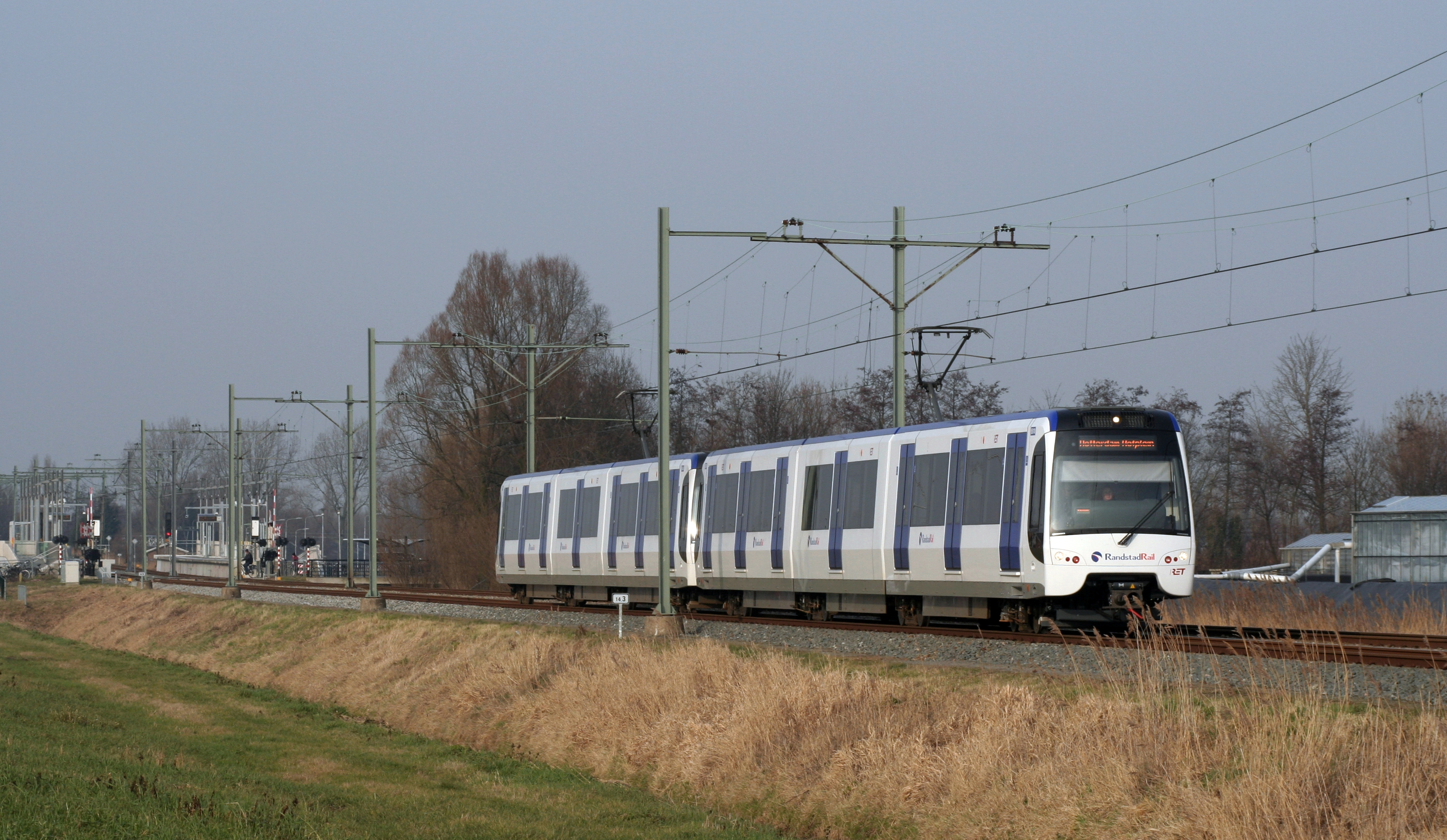
A new RET RandstadRail set, which replaced the Metro sets.
