= RandstadRail =

Light rail network in South Holland

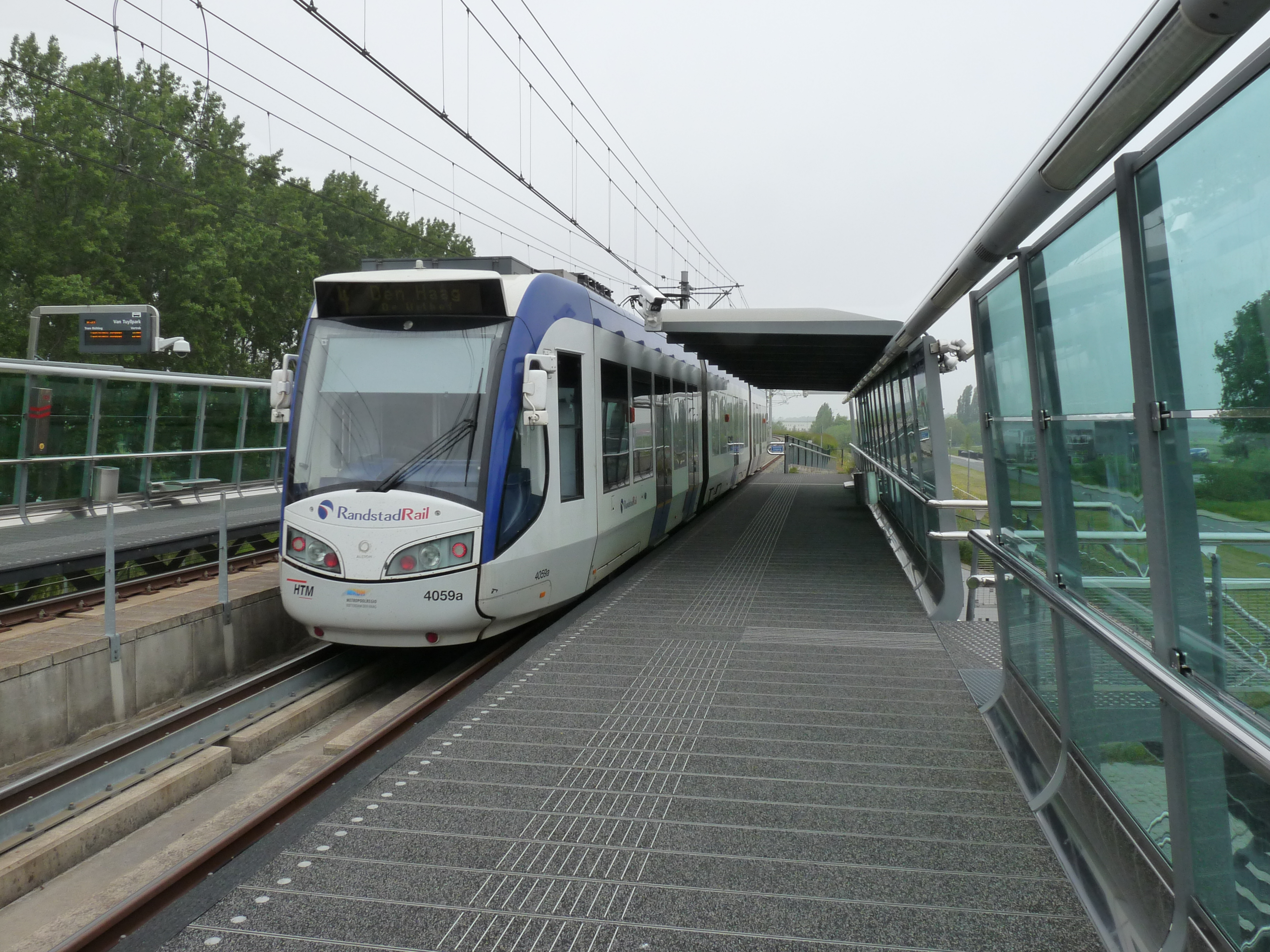
- RandstadRail tram at Van Tuyllpark station

Overview
- Locale: Rotterdam–The Hague metropolitan area, South Holland, Netherlands
- Transit type: Tram-train
- Number of lines: 4
- Number of stations: 73
- Daily ridership: 125,000 (2018)

Operation
- Began operation: 29 October 2006
- Operators: HTM Personenvervoer (HTM) and Rotterdamse Elektrische Tram (RET)
- Rolling stock: Bombardier Flexity Swift; Alstom RegioCitadis

Technical
- System length: ~71 km (44 mi)
- Track gauge: 1,435 mm (4 ft 8 1/2 in)

RandstadRail (Dutch pronunciation: [ˈrɑntstɑtˌreːl]) is a tram-train network in the Rotterdam–The Hague metropolitan area in the west of the Netherlands that is jointly operated by HTM Personenvervoer (HTM) and Rotterdamse Elektrische Tram (RET). It connects the cities of Rotterdam, The Hague and Zoetermeer, primarily using former train and existing tram tracks.

Named after the Randstad conurbation, the light rail network came into operation in 2006, after regular train services on the Hofpleinlijn and Zoetermeer Stadslijn had been discontinued. The system consists of four routes and serves 73 stations, with a total length of approximately 71 kilometres (44 mi). In 2018, it had a daily ridership of around 125,000 passengers.

== Rail network ==
Map of the RandstadRail network between The Hague (northwest), Zoetermeer (northeast) and Rotterdam (south) as of 2021

The RandstadRail network consists of four routes: one metro line (E) between The Hague and Rotterdam, and three tram-train lines (3, 4 and 34) between The Hague and Zoetermeer. Line E is operated by RET and uses high-floor Flexity Swift vehicles, while lines 3, 4 and 34 are operated by HTM and use low-floor RegioCitadis vehicles. Stations that are served by both types of carriages have extended platforms with a higher and a lower part.

Line	Route	Stations	Opened	Type
E	Den Haag Centraal – Rotterdam Slinge	23	2006	High-floor
3	Den Haag Loosduinen – Zoetermeer Centrum-West	39	2007	Low-floor
4	Den Haag De Uithof – Lansingerland-Zoetermeer	33	2006	Low-floor
34	Den Haag De Savornin Lohmanplein – Lansingerland-Zoetermeer	31	2020	Low-floor

=== Line E ===
Line E (formerly Erasmuslijn) is a metro line, which also belongs to the Rotterdam Metro network. For a great part, it runs on the former Hofpleinlijn railway line between Den Haag Centraal railway station and Rotterdam Hofplein railway station. After the train services had been discontinued, the track was re-opened as a RandstadRail line in September 2006, running between Nootdorp and Hofplein. In November 2006, the line was extended to The Hague.

As part of the line's conversion to RandstadRail operation, it began using RET metro trains, and more stops were added and train frequencies increased. Although the conversion had not been flawless, with a series of technical problems and a derailment, the line has been in full operation since September 2007.

In 2010, Hofplein terminus was replaced with the Statenwegtracé, a bored tunnel connecting the line with the local metro network at Rotterdam Centraal railway station. In December 2011, the line was further extended to Slinge metro station in the south of Rotterdam, sharing the section between Rotterdam Centraal and Slinge with the already existing line D.

=== Lines 3, 4 and 34 ===
The RandstadRail network originally included two tram-train lines: line 3 between Loosduinen and Zoetermeer Centrum-West, and line 4 between De Uithof and Lansingerland-Zoetermeer. On 23 July 2020, a third tram-train line was added to the network: line 34, which serves as a combination of lines 3 and 4, connecting Loosduinen to Lansingerland-Zoetermeer railway station.

West of Den Haag Centraal railway station, these lines are operated as regular street-running tram lines, partially interlined with the local network and passing through the Haagse tramtunnel, a 1.25 km (0.78 mi) tunnel under the Grote Marktstraat in the city centre. Between Den Haag Centraal and Zoetermeer, they operate on dedicated tracks as a light rail system. The section from Den Haag Centraal to Laan van NOI is elevated on a viaduct. From Laan van NOI to Leidschenveen, the lines share the track and stations with line E.

East of Leidschenveen, line 3 follows the same route as the former Zoetermeer Stadslijn, while lines 4 and 34 branch off towards Oosterheem after Seghwaert station. In 2019, the Oosterheem branch was extended from Javalaan to Lansingerland-Zoetermeer.

== Other services ==
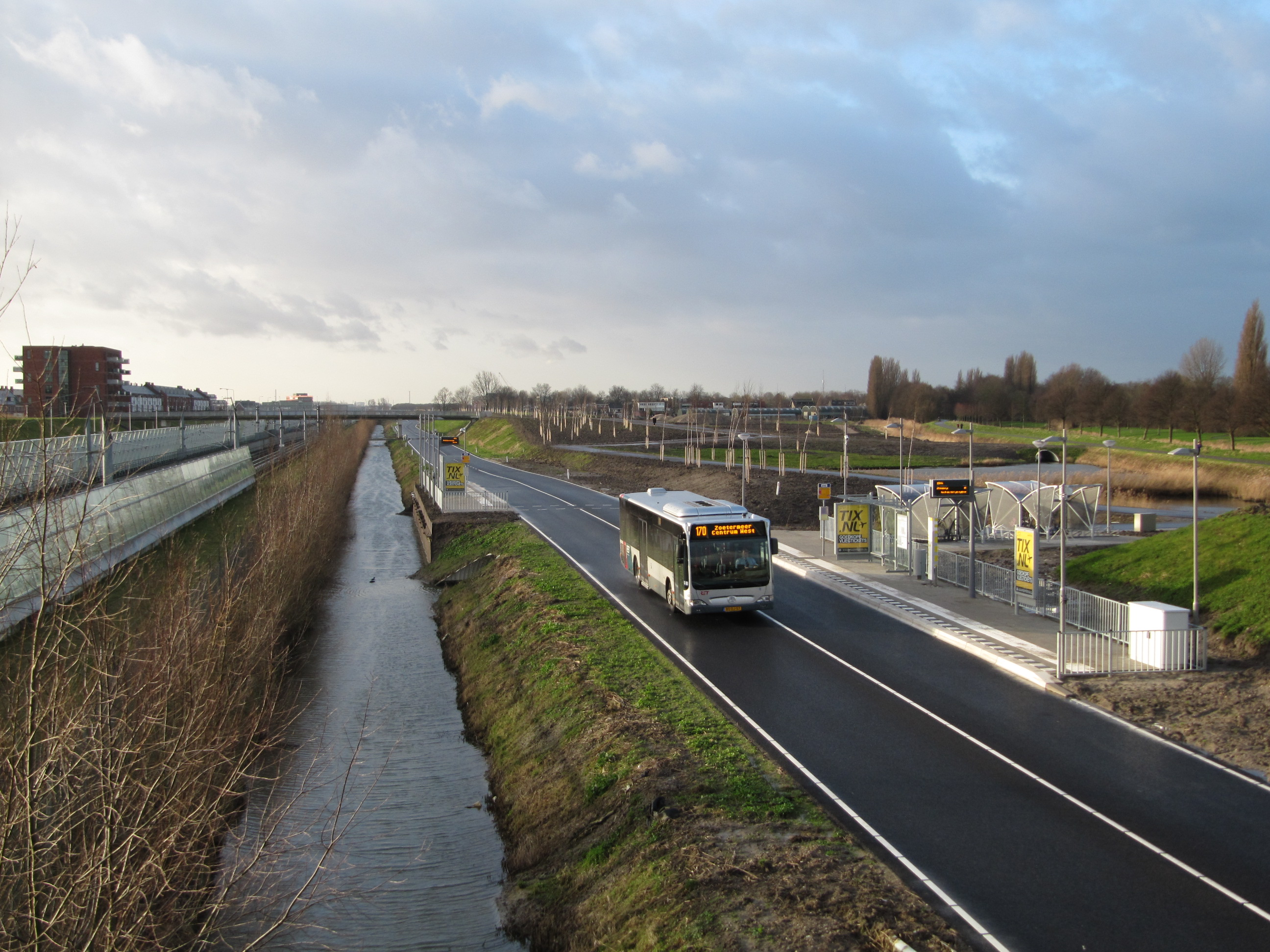
A ZoRo bus on the newly constructed bus lane near Berkel en Rodenrijs

=== ZoRo buses ===
In December 2012, two bus lines were added to the network. These so-called "ZoRo" buses run between Zoetermeer and Rodenrijs RandstadRail station, where they connect with RandstadRail line E. A new bus lane was constructed for the project. The buses are operated by RET and have an almost instant connection to arriving metros at Rodenrijs station. At the termini in Zoetermeer, the ZoRo buses connect with regional bus lines (Arriva and Veolia Transport) and RandstadRail lines 3, 4 and 34.

Line	Route
170	Rodenrijs RandstadRail station; Berkel en Rodenrijs; Zoetermeer railway station; Zoetermeer Oost railway station; Centrum-West RandstadRail station
173	Rodenrijs RandstadRail station; Berkel en Rodenrijs; Bergschenhoek; Korenmolenweg; Bleiswijk; Lansingerland-Zoetermeer railway station

=== Associated tram lines ===
Despite not being a part of the RandstadRail network, lines 2 and 19 of HTM's local tram network make use of RandstadRail-liveried RegioCitadis vehicles in addition to the regular Siemens Avenio trams. For line 19, this is necessary as it lacks balloon loops at its termini, meaning that the uni-directional GTL8 vehicles cannot be used on this route. Since 2015, the rolling stock of line 2 has been gradually replaced by Avenio vehicles.

== See also ==
- Trams in The Hague
- Trams in Rotterdam
- Transport in Rotterdam
