= HTM Personenvervoer =

Public transport operator in the Netherlands

HTM Personenvervoer NV

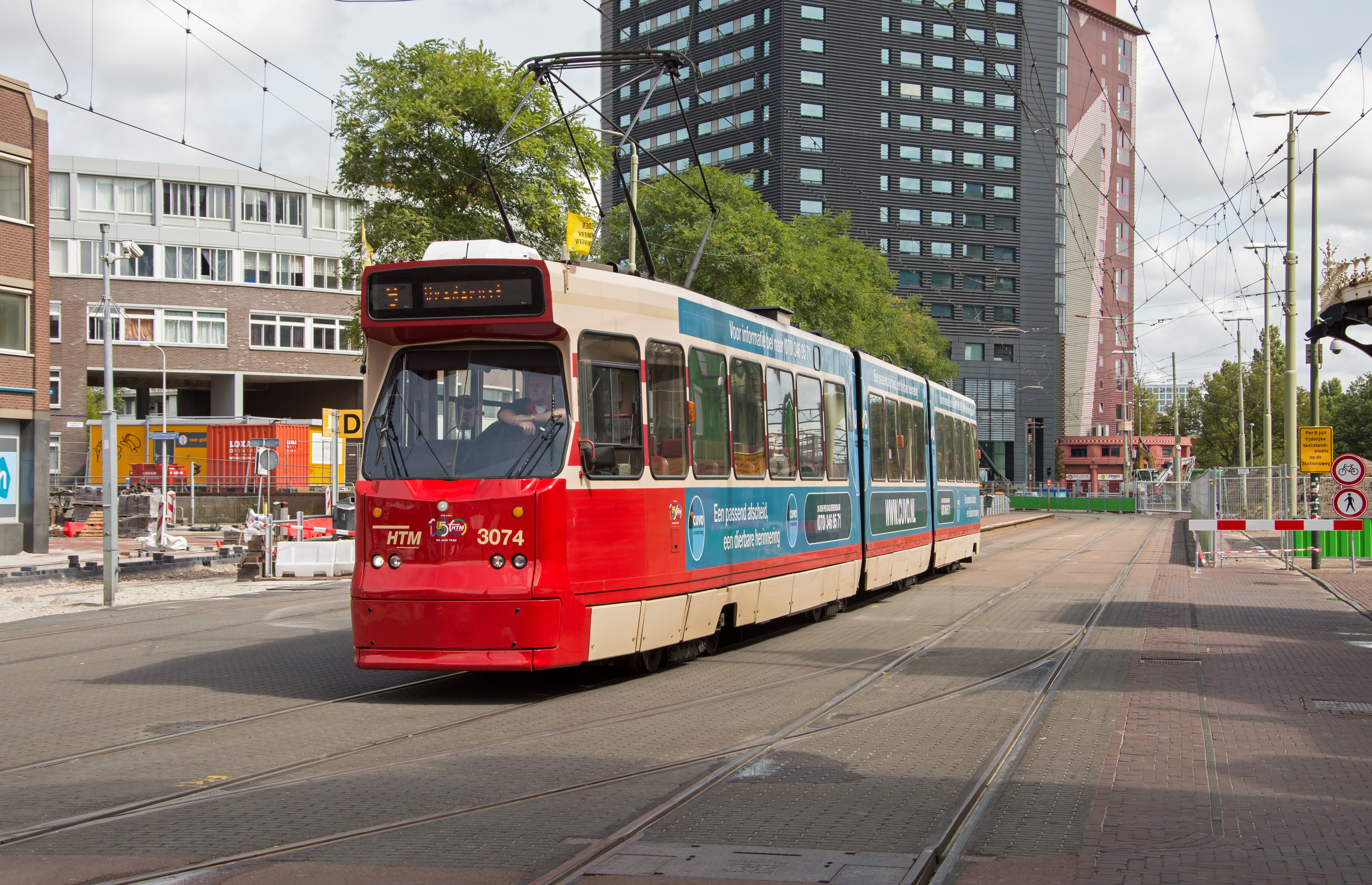
- An HTM tram
- Formerly: Haagsche Tramweg-Maatschappij (1887–1927); Mixed Company Haagsche Tramweg-Maatschappij (1927–2002)
- Type: Public limited company (N.V.)
- Industry: Public transport
- Predecessor: Haagsche Tramweg-Maatschappij
- Founded: September 22, 1887; 139 years ago in The Hague, Netherlands
- Headquarters: Koningin Julianaplein 10, The Hague, Netherlands
- Area served: The Hague, Delft, Rijswijk, Leidschendam, Voorburg, Zoetermeer, Nootdorp, Wateringen
- Key people: Jaap Bierman (CEO); Peter Dijk (Chairman of the Supervisory Board)
- Products: Tram, light rail, bus services
- Services: Public transport
- Owner: Municipality of The Hague (99%); Metropolitan Region Rotterdam The Hague (MRDH) (1%)
- Number of employees: 2005 (2023)
- Subsidiaries: HTM Railvoertuigen B.V. (100%); HTM Commercial Actions B.V. (100%); RiVier B.V. (27%, joint venture with RET and NS)
- Website: www.htm.nl

HTM, officially HTM Personenvervoer NV, formerly Haagsche Tramweg Maatschappij (lit. 'The Hague Tramway Company'), is a public transport operator based in The Hague, Netherlands.

The company operates tram, light rail, and bus services in The Hague and the surrounding Haaglanden region, including Rijswijk, Leidschendam-Voorburg, Delft, Zoetermeer, Wateringen, Pijnacker, and Nootdorp. HTM is a partner in the RandstadRail lightrail network, connecting The Hague with Zoetermeer and Rotterdam in cooperation with RET. The company operates under concessions granted by Metropolitan Region Rotterdam The Hague (MRDH) and is majority-owned by the municipality of The Hague.

== History ==
=== Predecessors ===
HTM traces its origins back to 21 March 1864, when a group of English investors founded The Dutch Tramway Company Ltd. (DTC). Within five months, DTC constructed the first horse-drawn tram line in the Benelux along the Scheveningseweg in The Hague, including a depot and stables at the Badhuisplein. After DTC went bankrupt in 1866, several successor companies attempted to continue operations. The Belgian Société Anonyme des Tramways de La Haye (TH) acquired the concession and expanded the network, connecting The Hague's city centre with the railway stations Hollandsch Spoor and Rijnspoor (later Staatsspoor, now Den Haag Centraal).

=== Formation ===
On 17 May 1887, the N.V. Haagsche Tramweg-Maatschappij (HTM) was founded with Dutch capital, taking over all rights and obligations from TH and accepting the conditions of the existing concession for tramway construction and operation in The Hague and its surroundings.

At that time, the network consisted of six horse-drawn tram lines. HTM began modernising the system, converting the horse-drawn line to Delft into a steam tram line in July 1887. The company also experimented with battery-powered trams from 1890, but these proved unreliable and noisy.

HTM developed plans for full electrification of the network, and after lengthy negotiations, the municipality granted HTM a concession to operate electric tram lines in 1904. The first electric tram ran on 6 August 1904, replacing the battery tram. By the end of 1926, HTM operated 16 tram lines with over 200 vehicles.

=== 1927 - 2002 ===
On 1 January 1927, the original HTM company was reorganised as N.V. Gemengd Bedrijf Haagsche Tramweg-Maatschappij (GBHTM), a mixed public-private company in which the municipality of The Hague held the majority of shares. The economic crisis of the 1930s forced HTM to postpone expansion plans and implement cost-saving measures such as one-man operation and the removal of trailers. Despite these challenges, some network extensions were realised.

During World War II, HTM’s tram network was severely affected by military operations and occupation policies. Fuel shortages made trams indispensable, and ridership soared, with 138 million passengers carried in 1943. However, maintenance was neglected, and many vehicles were requisitioned by the occupying forces. After the war, HTM rapidly restored and modernised its network, and expanded bus services to new residential areas. From the 1950s onwards, increased car ownership led to a decline in public transport use. Nevertheless, HTM continued to expand its bus network.

=== Since 2002 ===
On 11 June 2002, the company adopted its current name, HTM Personenvervoer N.V. (lit. 'HTM Passenger Transport') The introduction of the Wet personenvervoer 2000 (Passenger Transport Act 2000) introduced market competition to Dutch public transport, but in The Hague, as in other major cities, the concession was directly awarded to HTM.

Since 2006, HTM has operated the RandstadRail light rail connection to Zoetermeer. From 9 December 2012 to 15 December 2019, city bus services were operated by HTMbuzz, a joint venture between HTM and Qbuzz. After this period, these services returned to the HTM brand.

In September 2012, Nederlandse Spoorwegen (NS) announced its intention to acquire a 49% stake in HTM. The municipality of The Hague approved the sale in April 2013, with NS paying €45 million for the shares.

On 6 July 2016, it was announced that the municipality would buy back the shares from NS, and since 7 December 2016, HTM has been fully owned by the municipality of The Hague, with the Metropolitan Region Rotterdam The Hague (MRDH) holding a special share. On this date, HTM also obtained the rail concession for public transport in the region of The Hague for the period 2016–2026, later extended to 2031.

On 17 May 2017, the MRDH announced that HTM would be granted the bus concession for the region, effective from 8 December 2019 for the period 2019–2034.

== Network ==
=== Trams and Light Rail ===
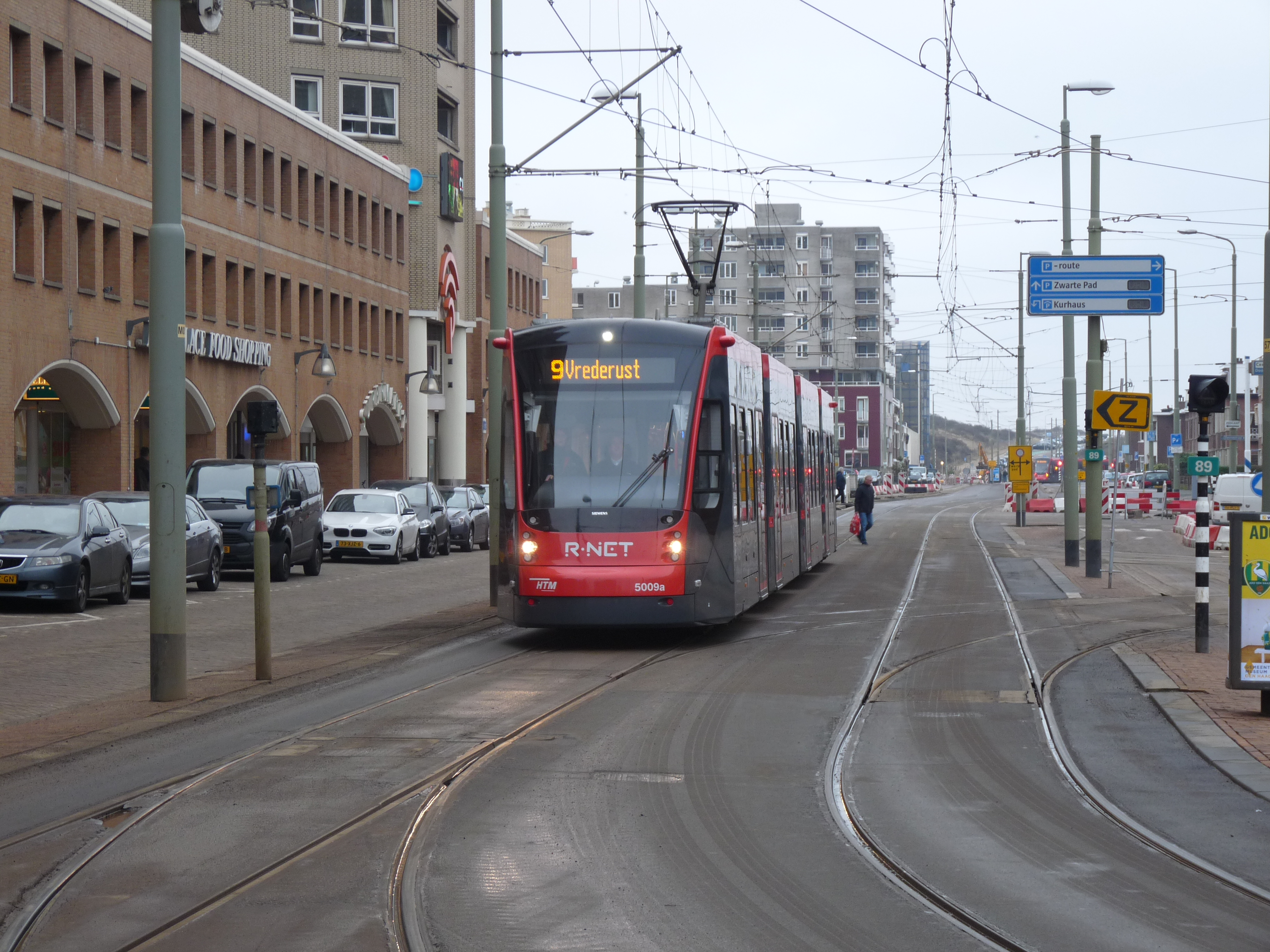
Line 9 at Scheveningen

HTM operates three types of trams: the classic GTL articulated trams, RegioCitadis trams, and modern low-floor Avenio trams built by Siemens. These vehicles run on 11 tram and light rail lines serving The Hague and surrounding towns, including Delft, Leidschendam, Nootdorp, Rijswijk, Voorburg, Wateringen, and Zoetermeer.

==== RandstadRail ====
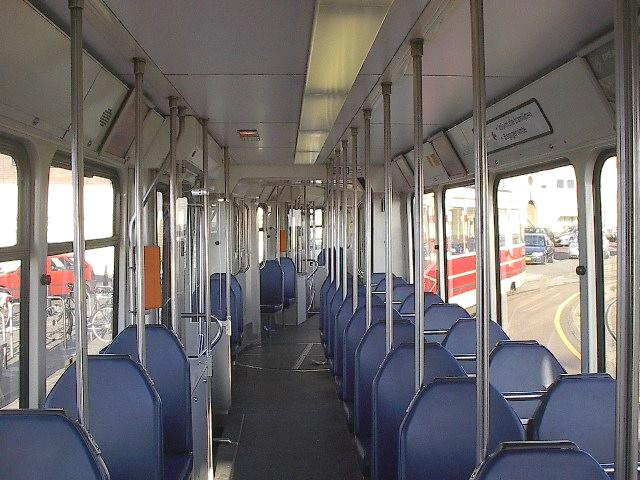
former interior (GTL)

Three of these lines (lines 3, 4, and 34) operate as part of the RandstadRail light rail system, connecting The Hague with Voorburg, Leidschendam, and Zoetermeer. Some city tram lines (such as lines 2 and 19) also use RandstadRail vehicles but mainly serve urban routes.

From 2026, new TINA trams are scheduled to replace the older GTL models currently running on lines 1, 6, 10, and 12. The first TINA trams are expected to enter service this year.

=== Buses ===
HTM operates two types of buses: VDL Citea SLF-120 E electric buses, and Mercedes-Benz Citaro buses (both 12 and 18 meters long) on nine bus routes across The Hague, Rijswijk, and Voorburg.

In February 2025, following a successful trial on line 24, HTM began gradually introducing new 12-meter electric eCitaro buses on lines 20, 21, 22, and 28. In March, testing started with the 18-meter articulated version (eCitaro G) on line 24, which will also be gradually rolled out on lines 23, 25, and 26. The articulated eCitaro G buses are expected to be fully integrated into regular service from June onwards.

==== Bus lines ====
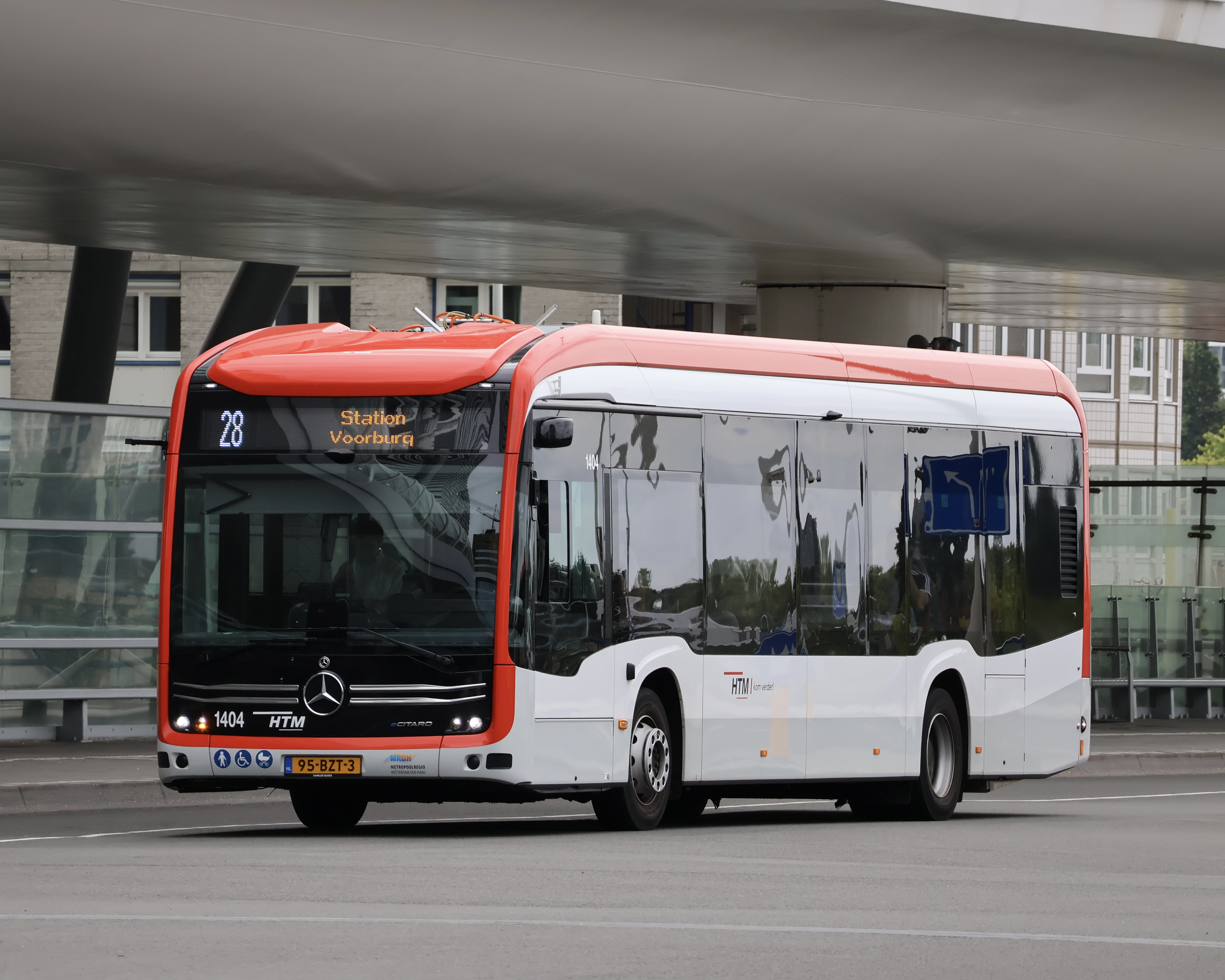
Mercedes-Benz eCitaro at Den Haag Centraal in June 2025

- 20 Den Haag Duinzigt - Den Haag Centraal railway station
- 21 Den Haag Vrederust - Scheveningen Noord
- 22 Den Haag Duindorp - Rijswijk De Schilp via Den Haag Centraal railway station
- 23 Den Haag Kijkduin - Scheveningen Noord via Rijswijk, Voorburg and Benoordenhout (Service between Kijkduin and Colijnplein restricted to weekends from May till September and during summer holidays)
- 24 Den Haag Kijkduin - Den Haag Mariahoeve railway station
- 25 Den Haag Grote Markt - Den Haag Vrederust
- 26 Den Haag Kijkduin - Den Haag HS railway station - Voorburg railway station (Restricted evening- & weekendservice between Kijkduin and The Hague HS)
- 27 Den Haag Randveen - Den Haag Mariahoeve railway station via Den Haag HS railway station en Den Haag Centraal railway station (Weekdays, rush hours only)
- 28 Den Haag Zuiderstrand - Voorburg railway station via Den Haag Centraal railway station, operated with electric buses
- 29 Rijswijk railway station - Den Haag Oude Waalsdorperweg (Weekdays, rush hours only)

=== Night Services ===
HTM operates night bus services under the name HTM Night Bus using MAN Lion's City CNG buses on six night routes (N1 to N6) covering The Hague and surrounding towns, including Leidschendam, Nootdorp, Rijswijk, Voorburg, Voorschoten, Wassenaar, and Zoetermeer. Night services were suspended from the start of the COVID-19 pandemic in 2020 until April 2024, initially due to health measures and later because of staff shortages. Since April 26, 2024, night buses have resumed regular operation.

==== Night lines ====
- N1 Centrum Binnenhof - Scheveningen via Den Haag Mariahoeve.
- N2 Centrum Binnenhof - Voorburg, Leidschendam, Voorschoten & Wassenaar.
- N3 Centrum Binnenhof - Den Haag Kraayenstein via Den Haag Loosduinen.
- N4 Centrum Binnenhof - Rijswijk via Wateringen.
- N5 Centrum Binnenhof - Delft via Ypenburg and Nootdorp; in Nootdorp connection with line B10 of the Rotterdam nightservice.
- N6 Centrum Binnenhof - Zoetermeer via Den Haag Leidschenveen, Zoetermeer Centrum and Zoetermeer Rokkeveen.

The nightlines are circular and operate on Friday- and Saturday nights only.

== See also ==
- RandstadRail
- Trams in The Hague
