= Den Haag Centraal railway station =

Railway station in The Hague

Den Haag Centraal
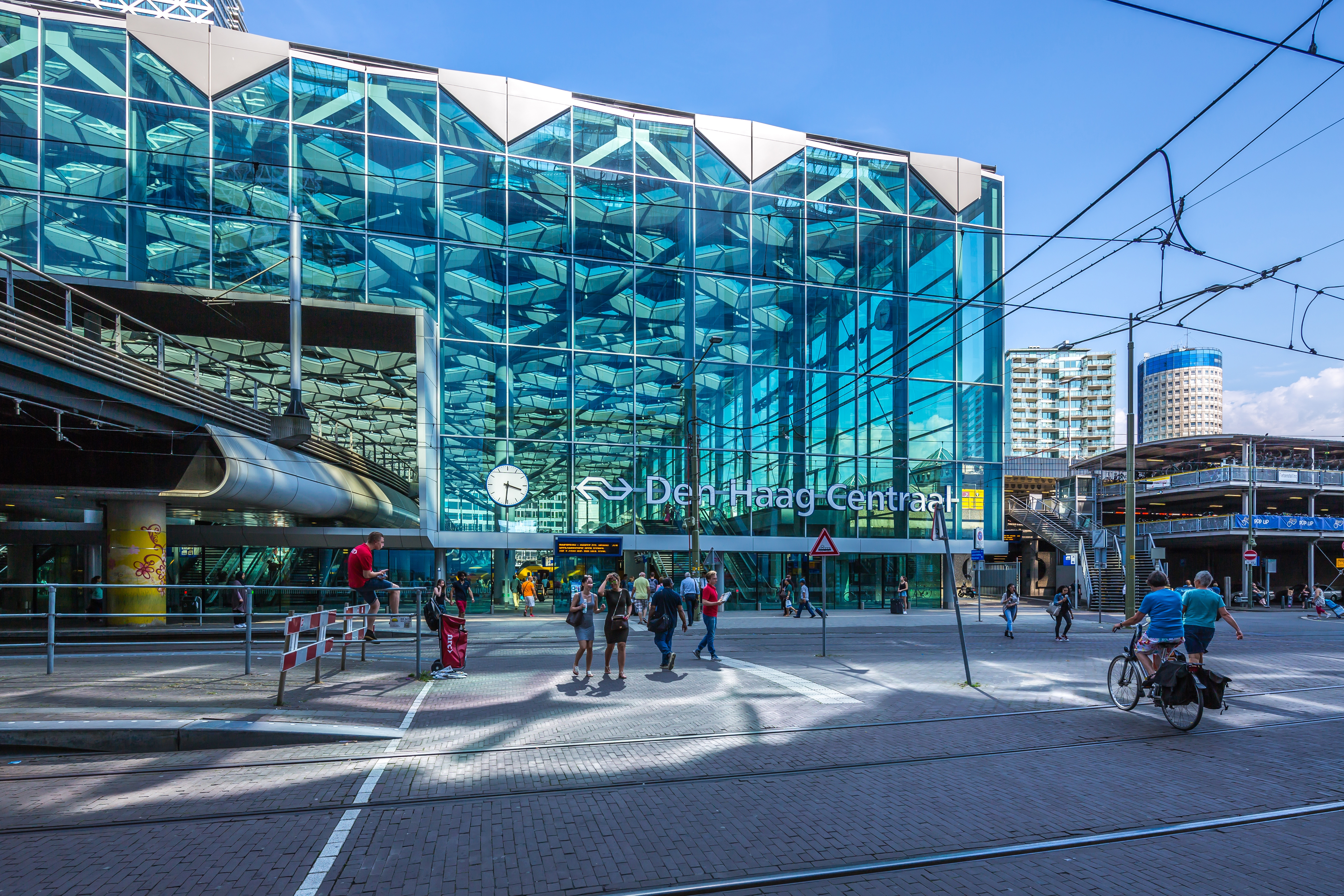
- Den Haag Centraal, exterior

General information
- Location: Koningin Julianaplein 10; The Hague, South Holland; Netherlands
- Coordinates: 52°4′54″N 4°19′45″E
- Operator: Nederlandse Spoorwegen
- Line: Gouda–Den Haag railway
- Platforms: 10

Other information
- Station code: Gvc

History
- Opened: 28 May 1976; 50 years ago
Services
Preceding station	Nederlandse Spoorwegen	Following station
Terminus	NS Intercity 500	Gouda towards Groningen
Terminus	NS Intercity 600	Gouda towards Leeuwarden
Terminus	NS Intercity 1100	Den Haag HS towards Eindhoven Centraal
Terminus	NS Intercity 1700 Until 20:00	Gouda towards Enschede
Terminus	NS Intercity 2100	Leiden Centraal towards Amsterdam Centraal
Terminus	NS Intercity 3100	Leiden Centraal towards Nijmegen
Terminus	NS Sprinter 4300	Den Haag Laan van NOI towards Lelystad Centrum
Terminus	NS Sprinter 5000 Mon-Fri until 20:00	Den Haag HS towards Dordrecht
Terminus	NS Sprinter 5100	Den Haag HS towards Dordrecht
Terminus	NS Sprinter 5200 Mon-Thu until 19:00	Den Haag HS towards Dordrecht
Terminus	NS Sprinter 6000 After 18:00 and Fri-Sun	Voorburg towards 's-Hertogenbosch
Terminus	NS Sprinter 6300	Den Haag Laan van NOI towards Haarlem
Terminus	NS Sprinter 6800	Voorburg towards Gouda Goverwelle
Terminus	NS Sprinter 6900 Mon-Thur until 18:00	Voorburg towards Tiel
Preceding station	Rotterdam Metro	Following station
Terminus	Line E	Den Haag Laan van NOI towards Slinge
Location
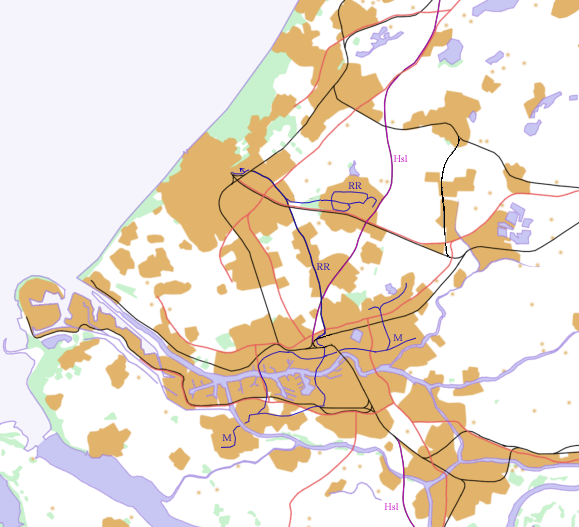
- Location within Southwest Randstad Location within Netherlands

Den Haag Centraal (Dutch pronunciation: [dɛn ˌɦaːx sɛnˈtraːl]; English: "The Hague Central") is the largest railway station in the city of The Hague in South Holland, Netherlands, and with twelve tracks, the largest terminal station in the Netherlands. The railway station opened in 1973, adjacent to its predecessor: Den Haag Staatsspoor, which was subsequently demolished. It is the western terminus of the Gouda–Den Haag railway.

== History ==
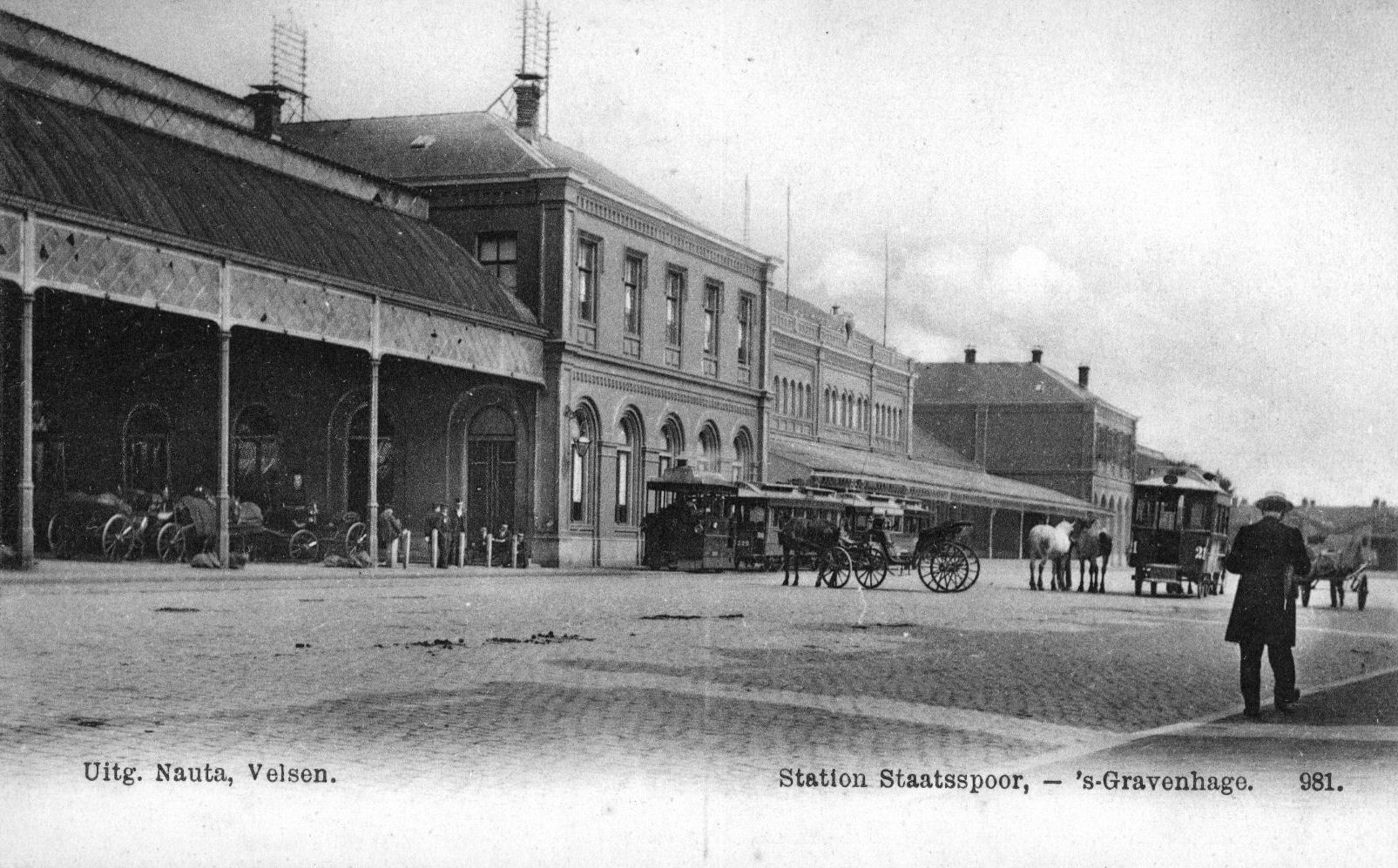
Staatsspoor in the early 20th century

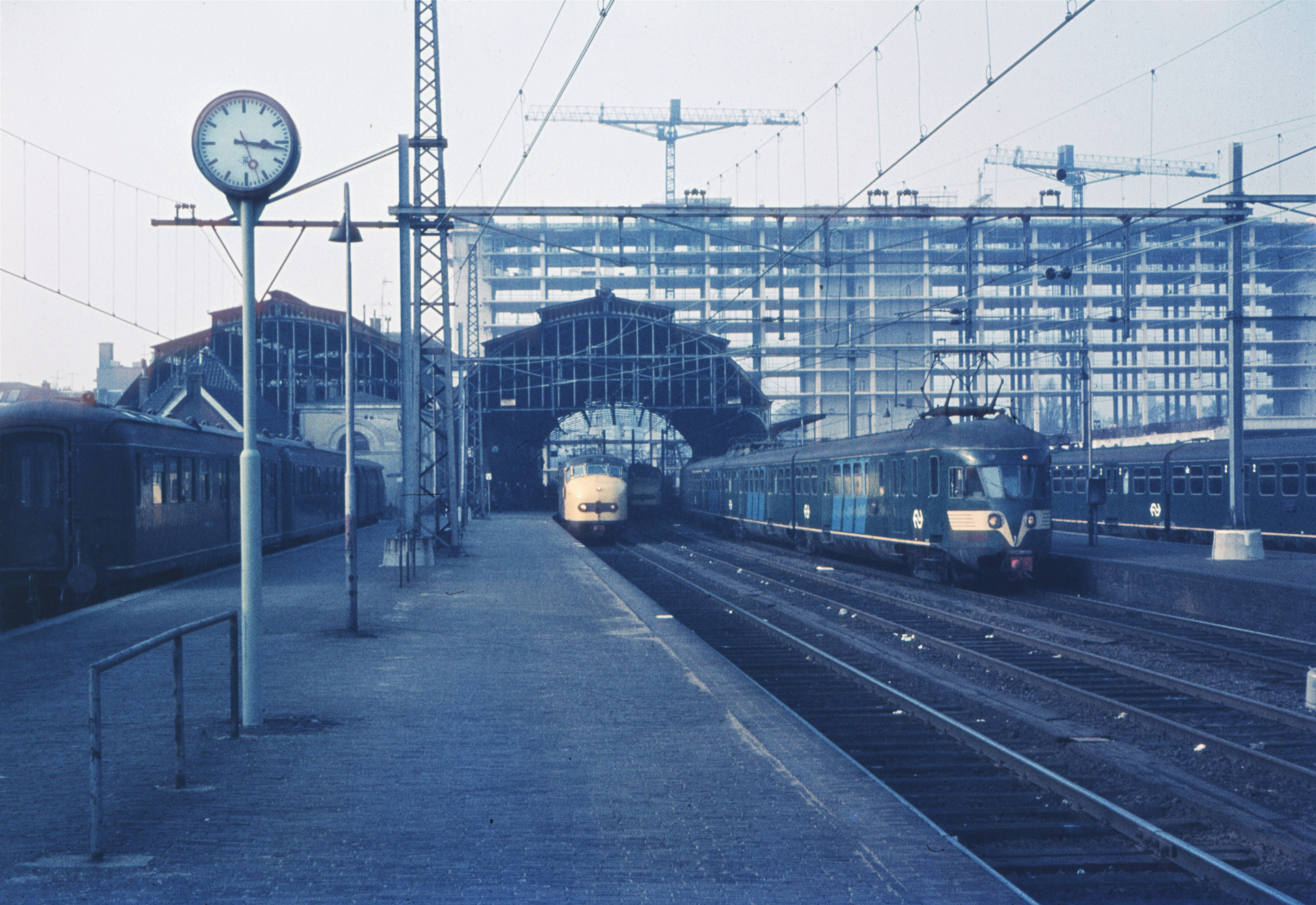
Staatsspoor in 1972, with the new Centraal Station under construction in the background

The oldest station in The Hague is Den Haag Hollands Spoor, opened in 1843 by the Hollandsche IJzeren Spoorweg-Maatschappij when the railway between Amsterdam and Leiden was extended to The Hague and Rotterdam. This station was located at some distance from the city centre, just across what was then the municipal boundary of Rijswijk. In 1870, the Nederlandsche Rhijnspoorweg-Maatschappij (NRS) opened a second station in The Hague closer to the city centre. This station, Den Haag Rijnspoor, would service eastbound trains to Gouda and Utrecht. When the NRS was nationalised in 1890, this Gouda–Den Haag railway became the property of the Maatschappij tot Exploitatie van Staatsspoorwegen, and the station was renamed Den Haag Staatsspoor.

Den Haag Staatsspoor was a small building designed by A.W. van Erkel situated parallel to the railway, with the entrance facing sideways toward the city centre. This was designed to facilitate an extension of the railway to Scheveningen, which was constructed in 1907 but closed again in 1953. Staatsspoor was connected to Hollands Spoor and the Amsterdam–Haarlem–Rotterdam railway for passengers in the late 19th century, but that connection, too, was later discontinued. The building was notable for containing a royal waiting room for use by the Dutch monarchy.

In 1962, urban designer David Jokinen saw an opportunity to put an end to the situation with two main stations where Staatsspoor and Hollands Spoor each served only part of the rail traffic. The Jokinen Plan included demolishing the Staatsspoor station entirely. The railway from Utrecht and Gouda would terminate at Hollands Spoor, which would then become the city's central railway station. The demolition of the railway to Staatsspoor, meanwhile, would make space for an urban motorway and a monorail line. However, the plan was never realised.

In the 1960s, Nederlandse Spoorwegen planned for The Hague to get a central railway station. While it initially intended to rebuild Hollands Spoor into a central railway station, The municipality of The Hague resisted this plan because it preferred a location closer to the city centre so that government buildings would be more accessible. Moreover, the buildings around Hollands Spoor provided little space for expansion of tracks and platforms in the future. It was therefore decided that a new station would be built next to Staatsspoor. With plans for an extension of the railway to Scheveningen definitively cancelled, this new station would become the terminal station of the Gouda–Den Haag railway. Construction started in 1970, and on 27 September 1973, the construction had advanced enough to allow for the opening a number of platforms. Trains previously headed for Staatsspoor were transferred to Centraal Station, and the now-redundant Staatsspoor was demolished in the same year. At the time of the building's demolition, its royal waiting room was dismantled and stored; it was put on display in the Railway Museum (Netherlands) in Utrecht in the early 2000s. The bus platform was opened in 1975, and construction of Centraal Station finalised in 1976 with the opening of its tram station. The train station was officially opened on 28 May of that year. A chord to connect the station to Den Haag Laan van NOI and the railway to Amsterdam was also completed in 1975, while a chord to connect it to Den Haag Hollands Spoor and the railway to Rotterdam was completed the following year. This ensured that trains coming from north, east and south could all reach Den Haag Centraal.

Although Centraal station is the largest station in The Hague, it is served only by terminating trains; Intercity and international trains travelling between Amsterdam and Rotterdam stop only at Hollands Spoor station, while trains from Utrecht and Gouda can only reach Centraal station. The Hague is the only city in the Netherlands retaining two separate major railway hubs, although since its opening Amsterdam Zuid station has been growing in importance as a second major railway hub for Amsterdam, alternative to Amsterdam Centraal station.

By the 2010s, the number of travellers per day had grown to 190,000, and Den Haag Centraal had outgrown its capacity. In order to increase the station's capacity, a renovation of its main hall was started in 2011. The roof was replaced by one which is higher, and made of diamond-shaped glass plates placed in a framework of stainless steel. Moreover, more commercial space was added next to both side entrances, and new tiling was placed. The new main hall was opened by State Secretary Sharon Dijksma and mayor Jozias van Aartsen on 1 February 2016.

== Train services ==
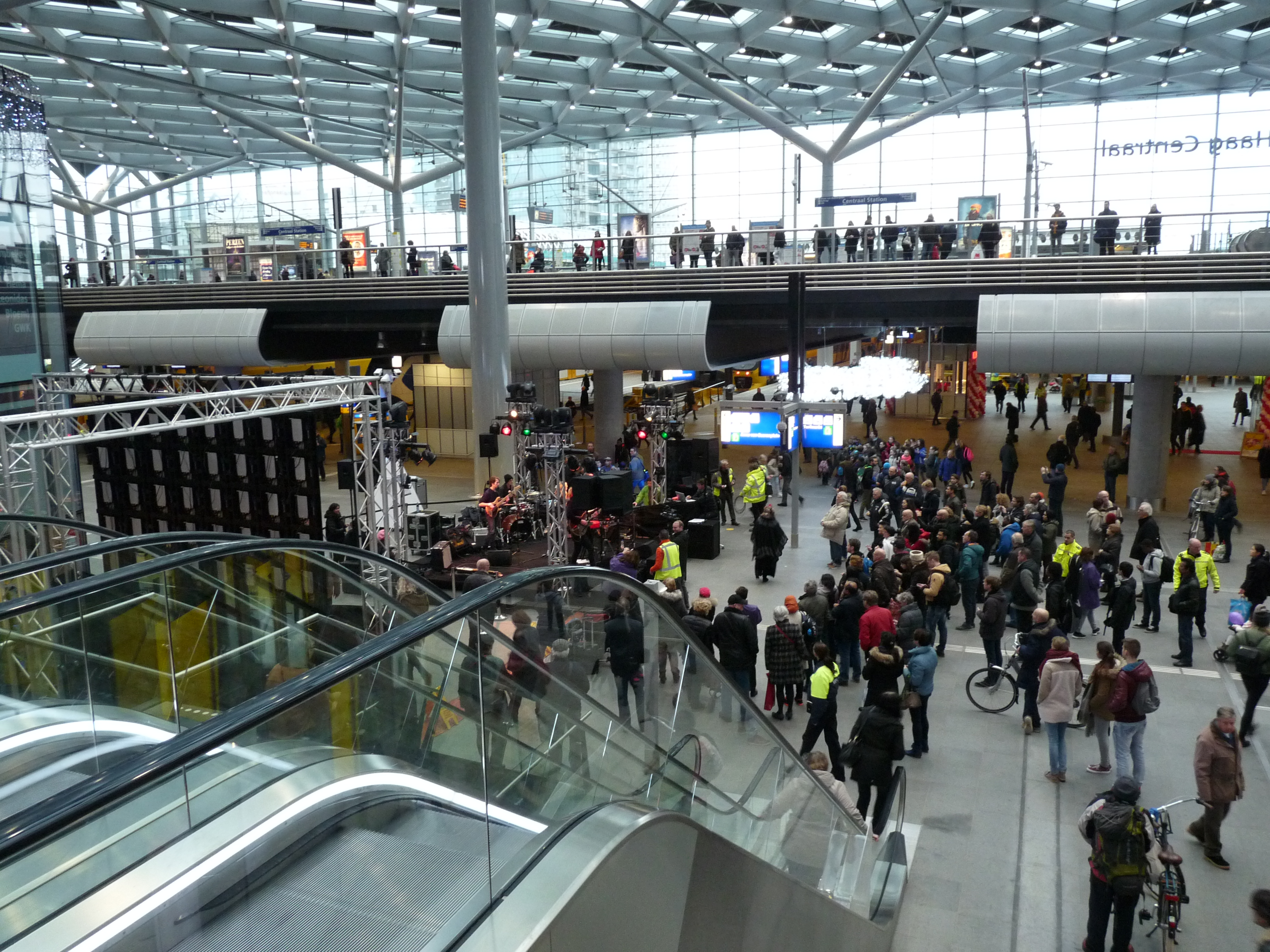
Main hall of Den Haag Centraal in 2016

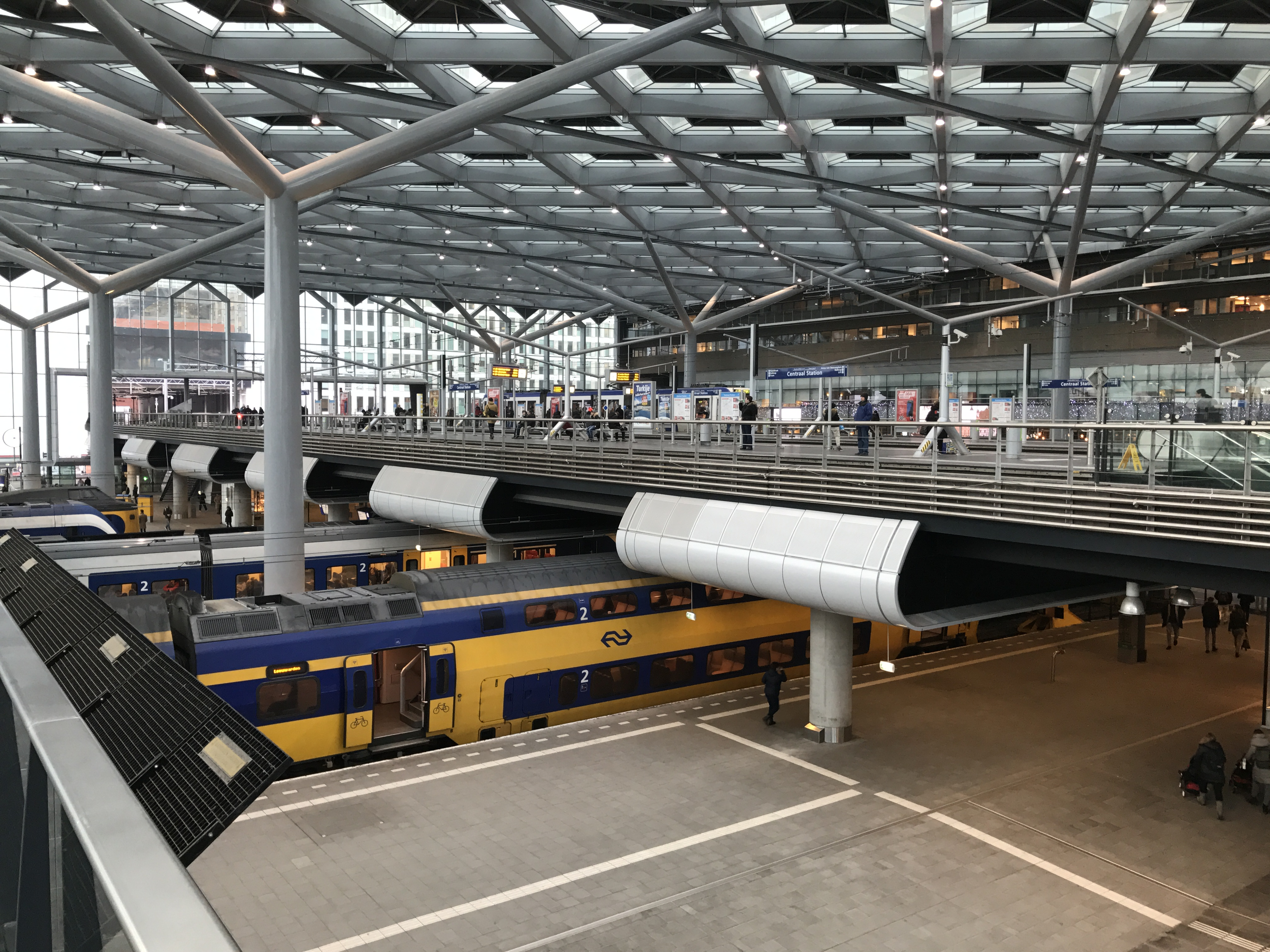
The elevated tram station above the mainline tracks

There are 22 scheduled trains per hour that leave Den Haag Centraal on a normal weekday (07:00 - 20:00). Sprinter services call at every station along the way whilst Intercity trains only stop at the major stations. There are 6 trains an hour (each way) connecting Den Haag Centraal with Rotterdam Centraal, 6 trains an hour connecting it with Utrecht and 4 with Amsterdam.

Series	Type	Route	Frequency
700	Intercity	Den Haag Centraal - Leiden Centraal - Schiphol Airport - A'dam Zuid - Almere Centrum - Lelystad Centrum - Zwolle - Groningen	1x per hour
1100	Intercity	Den Haag Centraal - Den Haag HS - Delft - Rotterdam Centraal - Breda - Tilburg - Eindhoven	2x per hour
1700	Intercity	Den Haag Centraal - Gouda - Utrecht Centraal - Amersfoort Centraal - Apeldoorn - Deventer - Almelo - Hengelo - Enschede	1x per hour (Forms half hourly service between Den Haag Centraal and Amersfoort Centraal with the 11700)
1800	Intercity	Den Haag Centraal - Leiden Centraal - Schiphol Airport - A'dam Zuid - Almere Centrum - Lelystad Centrum - Zwolle - Leeuwarden	1x per hour
2000	Intercity	Den Haag Centraal - Gouda - Utrecht Centraal	2x per hour
2100	Intercity	Den Haag Centraal - Leiden Centraal - Haarlem - A'dam Sloterdijk - Amsterdam Centraal	2x per hour
4600	Sprinter	Den Haag Centraal - Leiden Centraal - Schiphol Airport - A'dam Sloterdijk - Amsterdam Centraal (Continues as 14600 to Almere - Lelystad - Zwolle)	2x per hour
5000	Sprinter	Den Haag Centraal - Den Haag HS - Delft - Rotterdam Centraal - Dordrecht	2x per hour (Forms a quarter hourly service with the 5100)
5100	Sprinter	Den Haag Centraal - Den Haag HS - Delft - Rotterdam Centraal - Dordrecht	2x per hour (Forms a quarter hourly service with the 5000)
6300	Sprinter	Den Haag Centraal - Leiden Centraal - Haarlem	2x per hour
6800	Sprinter	Den Haag Centraal - Gouda - Gouda Goverwelle	2x per hour
6900	Sprinter	Den Haag Centraal - Gouda - Utrecht Centraal - Tiel	2x per hour
11700	Intercity	Den Haag Centraal - Gouda - Utrecht Centraal - Amersfoort Centraal - Amersfoort Schothorst	1x per hour (Forms half hourly service between Den Haag Centraal and Amersfoort Centraal with the 1700)

== Other transport ==
=== Tram services ===
Den Haag Centraal is a public transport hub and a major nodal hub for the tram network run by HTM Personenvervoer. The railway station features two separate sets of platforms.

Upper tram station

These are two elevated island platforms serving four tracks, located above and lying perpendicular to the heavy rail tracks, serving lines 2, 3, 4, and 6. Regular lines 2 and 6 use the inner tracks, while the RandstadRail lines 3 and 4 use the outer tracks. They connect directly to the city centre tunnel to the west and the elevated tracks to Ternoot and Beatrixkwartier to the east.

Platform	Line	Destination	Via
A	3	Den Haag Loosduinen	Tramtunnel, Prinsegracht, HMC Westeinde, Bomen/-Vruchtenbuurt, Bohemen
A	4	Den Haag De Uithof	Tramtunnel, Prinsegracht, HMC Westeinde, Rustenburg/Oostbroek, Leyenburg, Bouwlust
A	34	Den Haag De Savonin Lohmanplein	Tramtunnel, Prinsegracht, HMC Westeinde, Bomen/-Vruchtenbuurt
B	2	Den Haag Kraayenstein	Tramtunnel, Prinsegracht, HMC Westeinde, Nieuw Eykenduynen, Oud Eik en Duinen, Houtwijk, Loosduinen
B	6	Den Haag Leyenburg	Tramtunnel, Prinsegracht, Schilderswijk, Haagse Markt, Transvaalkwartier, Rustenburg/Oostbroek
C	2	Leidschendam	Ternoot, Bezuidenhout, Laan van NOI, Voorburg 't Loo, Essesteijn, Leidsenhage
C	6	Leidschendam Noord	Ternoot, Bezuidenhout, Haagse Hout, Station Mariahoeve, Essesteijn, Leidsenhage
D	3	Zoetermeer Centrum	Beatrixkwartier, Laan van NOI, Voorburg 't Loo, Leidschendam-Voorburg, Forepark, Leidschenveen, Zoetermeerse Rijweg, Voorweg, Centrum-West, Seghwaert, Zoetermeerse Krakeling
D	4	Lansingerland-Zoetermeer	Beatrixkwartier, Laan van NOI, Voorburg 't Loo, Leidschendam-Voorburg, Forepark, Leidschenveen, Zoetermeerse Rijweg, Voorweg, Centrum-West, Seghwaert, Oosterheem
D	34	Lansingerland-Zoetermeer	Beatrixkwartier, Laan van NOI, Voorburg 't Loo, Leidschendam-Voorburg, Forepark, Leidschenveen, Zoetermeerse Rijweg, Voorweg, Centrum-West, Seghwaert, Oosterheem

Lower tram station

These are two ground-level side platforms and one island platform between them, located parallel to the heavy rail tracks outside the south-western entrance. All other city tram lines that call at the station use these platforms.

Platform	Line	Destination	Via
E	9	Scheveningen Noord	Malieveld, Koninginnegracht, Madurodam, Westbroekpark, Circustheater, Kurhaus
E	17	Den Haag Statenkwartier	Korte Voorhout, Buitenhof, Zeeheldenkwartier, Kunstmuseum
F	15	Nootdorp	Korte Voorhout, Buitenhof, Centrum, Bierkade, Waldorpstraat/Station Hollands Spoor, Laakkwartier, Rijswijk, Hoornbrug, Broekpolder, P+R Hoornwijck, Ypenburg
G	16	Wateringen	Kalvermarkt-Stadhuis, Bierkade, Station Hollands Spoor, Laakkwartier, Spoorwijk, Station Moerwijk, Moerwijk, Winkelcentrum Leyweg, Morgenstond, Hoge Veld, Wateringse Veld
H	9	Vrederust	Kalvermarkt-Stadhuis, Bierkade, Station Hollands Spoor, Stationsbuurt, Zuiderpark, Moerwijk, Winkelcentrum Leyweg, Morgenstond
H	17	Wateringen	Rijswijkseplein, Station Hollands Spoor, Laakkwartier, Spoorwijk, Plaspoelpolder, Rijswijk Station, In de Bogaard, Eikelenburg, Wateringse Veld

=== Metro services ===
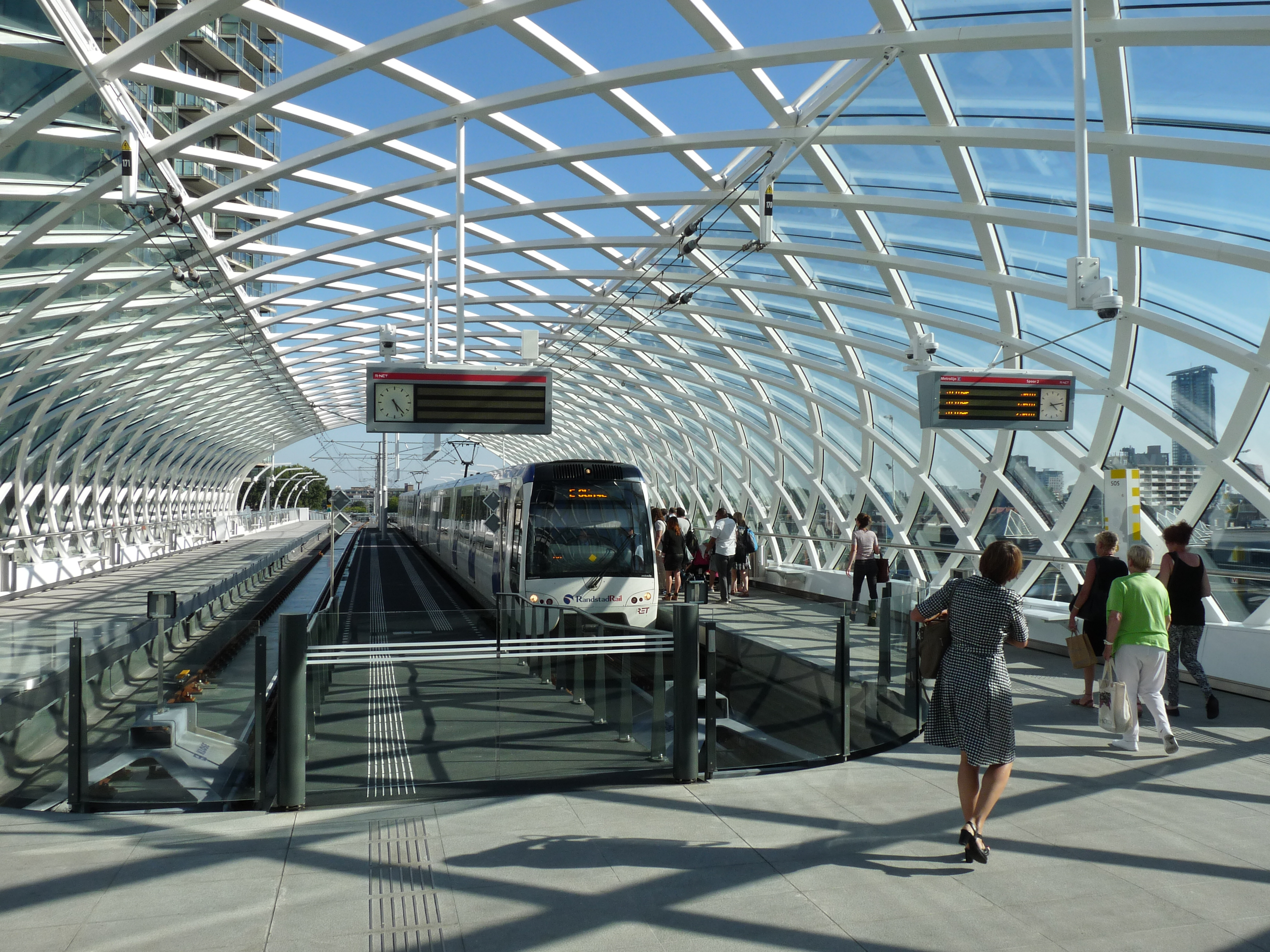
New metro station

The Rotterdam-based RET operates RandstadRail line E, a high-capacity metro service via Leidschenveen and Pijnacker to Rotterdam Centraal station. From there it shares track with line D of the Rotterdam Metro and terminates at Slinge station.

Until August 2016, these services used platforms 11 and 12 of the mainline station, alongside the heavy rail tracks. Since then, two dedicated elevated platforms have come into use. Here, metro trains use the high-level side platforms; the low-level island platform is used by RandstadRail trams in case of emergency, when the connecting tracks via Beatrixkwartier cannot be used.

=== Bus services ===
There is a bus platform above the rail roads, which is connected to the Prins Bernhardviaduct running over the tracks. The platform is accessible from the station's main hall. Several city and regional lines of three different carriers stop here. HTM's bus lines starting with an N are night buses and only run on Fridays and Saturdays.

Platform	Line	Destination	Via	Carrier
I	All	Final destination		
J	24	Den Haag Kijkduin	Centrum, Kneuterdijk, Plein 1813, Javastraat, Vredespaleis, Duinoord, Kunstmuseum, Vogelwijk, Bohemen	HTM
K	22	Den Haag Duindorp	Centrum, Kneuterdijk, Plein 1813, Javastraat, Madurodam, Kurhaus, Scheveningen	HTM
K	28	Den Haag Zuiderstrand	Centrum, Kneuterdijk, Plein 1813, Javastraat, Vredespaleis, World Forum, Westduinweg	HTM
L	24	Station Mariahoeve	Haagse Hout, Mariahoeve	HTM
M	20	Duinzigt	Malieveld, Benoordenhout, HMC Bronovo, Waalsdorperweg	HTM
M	29	Den Haag Oude Waalsdorperweg	Malieveld, Benoordenhout, HMC Bronovo, Waalsdorperweg	HTM
N	22	Rijswijk De Schilp	Station Hollands Spoor, MegaStores, Laakkwartier, Rijswijk Station, Bogaard stadscentrum, Steenvoorde	HTM
N	29	Station Rijswijk	Station Hollands Spoor, MegaStores, Laakkwartier	HTM
O	28	Station Voorburg	Binckhorst	HTM
P	45	Leiden, Centraal Station	Beatrixkwartier/Bezuidenhout, Voorburg (Station, Station Leidschendam-Voorburg), GGZ Rivierduinen, Voorschoten, Station Lammenschans, Breestraat	EBS
P	46	Wassenaar, Duinrell	Beatrixkwartier/Bezuidenhout, Voorburg (Station, Station Leidschendam-Voorburg), Leidschendam (HMC Antoniushove, Mall of the Netherlands, GGZ Rivierduinen), Voorschoten (Station, Wassenaar (Van Oldenbarneveltweg)	EBS
Q	43	Leiden, Centraal Station	Bezuidenhout, Marlot, Wassenaar (De Kieviet, van Oldenbarneveltweg, Maaldrift), Haagse Schouw, Universiteit Leiden	EBS
Q	44	Wassenaar, Duinrell	Bezuidenhout, Marlot, Wassenaar (De Kieviet, van Oldenbarneveltweg)	EBS
R	382	Waddinxveen, Station	Haagse Poort, Voorburg, Zoetermeer (Station/Mandelabrug)	Arriva
R	383	Rotterdam, Capelsebrug	Haagse Poort, Voorburg, Zoetermeer (Station/Mandelabrug, Lansingerland-Zoetermeer), Moerkapelle, Zevenhuizen, Rotterdam (Metro Nesselande), Nieuwerkerk aan den IJssel (Zilvermos, Reigerhof, Station), Capelle aan den IJssel (Metro De Terp, Metro Centrum)	Arriva
R	384	Waddinxveen, Station	Haagse Poort, Voorburg, Zoetermeer (Station/Mandelabrug, Lansingerland-Zoetermeer), Moerkapelle, Zevenhuizen	Arriva
R	386	Gouda, Station	Haagse Poort, Voorburg, Zoetermeer (Station/Mandelabrug, Lansingerland-Zoetermeer), Moerkapelle, Zevenhuizen, Waddinxveen	Arriva
S	144	Wassenaar, Duinrell	Van Oldenbarneveltweg	EBS
S	385	Sassenheim, Station	Wassenaar (Kerkehout, Deijleroord), Valkenburg, Katwijk, Noordwijk, Voorhout	Arriva
S	685	Oegstgeest, Leidsebuurt	Wassenaar (Kerkehout, Deijleroord)	Arriva

== See also ==
- Zebra clock
