= Bezuidenhout =

Neighbourhood of The Hague, Netherlands

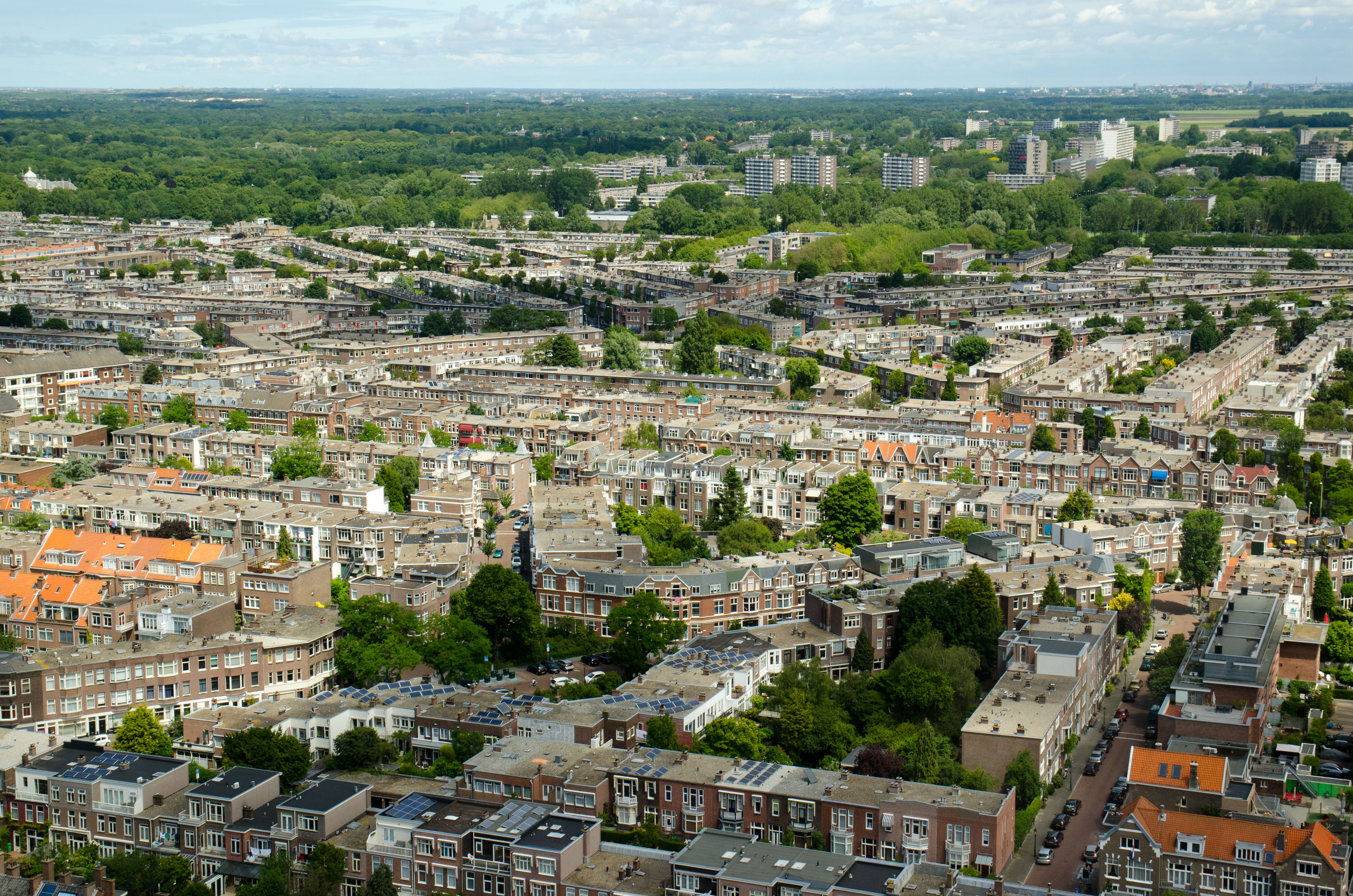

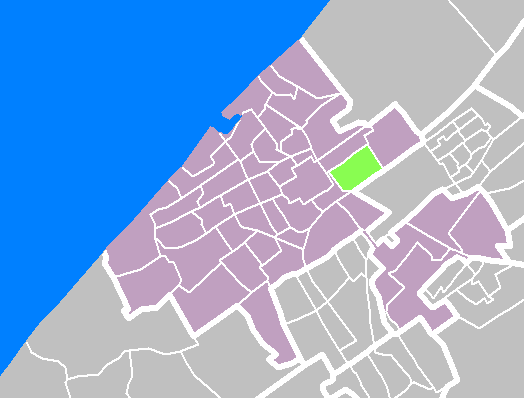
- Bezuidenhout (green) is the southernmost of the four Haagse Hout district in The Hague (violet)
- Coordinates: 52°5′17″N 4°20′41″E
- Country: Netherlands
- Province: South Holland
- Municipality: The Hague
- District: Haagse Hout

Area
  - Total: 1.927 km^{2} (0.744 sq mi)
  - Land: 1.912 km^{2} (0.738 sq mi)

Population (1 January 2025)
  - Total: 19,466
  - Density: 10,180/km^{2} (26,370/sq mi)
- Time zone: UTC+1 (CET)
  - Summer (DST): UTC+2 (CEST)

Bezuidenhout (Dutch pronunciation: [bəˈzœydə(n)ˌɦʌut]; English: "South of the Wood") is the neighbourhood (Dutch: wijk) southeast of the Haagse Bos district of The Hague in the Netherlands. Bezuidenhout includes the Beatrixkwartier financial area near the Central Station and streets such as Bezuidenhoutseweg, Juliana van Stolberglaan, Laan van Nieuw Oost-Indië, Prins Clauslaan, and Theresiastraat.

Part of German-occupied Europe during World War II, Bezuidenhout was bombed by mistake by the Royal Air Force in a bombing raid which killed hundreds of civilians. The targeted area was the adjacent woodland park Haagse Bos that was used by the Germans for launching V-1 and V-2 rockets, but all bombs missed the forest target by more than 500 yards (460 m) because of an error in reading the map, overcast conditions and incorrect allowance for the wind. The mistake caused the deaths of 511 civilians.

Because nobody was certain about what to do after the explosion, there were no plans to reconstruct the neighbourhood until 1962, when David Jokinen saw an opportunity to put an end to the situation in which the Staatsspoor station and the Hollands Spoor each served only part of the rail traffic. His plan included demolishing the Staatsspoor Station. His plan sparked fierce discussions. The plan was not implemented, in part because it was only presented when decision-making had finally reached an advanced stage. Today, the Den Haag Centraal railway station stands in place of the Staatsspoor station.
