= Javalaan RandstadRail station =

Railway station in Zoetermeer, Netherlands

Javalaan
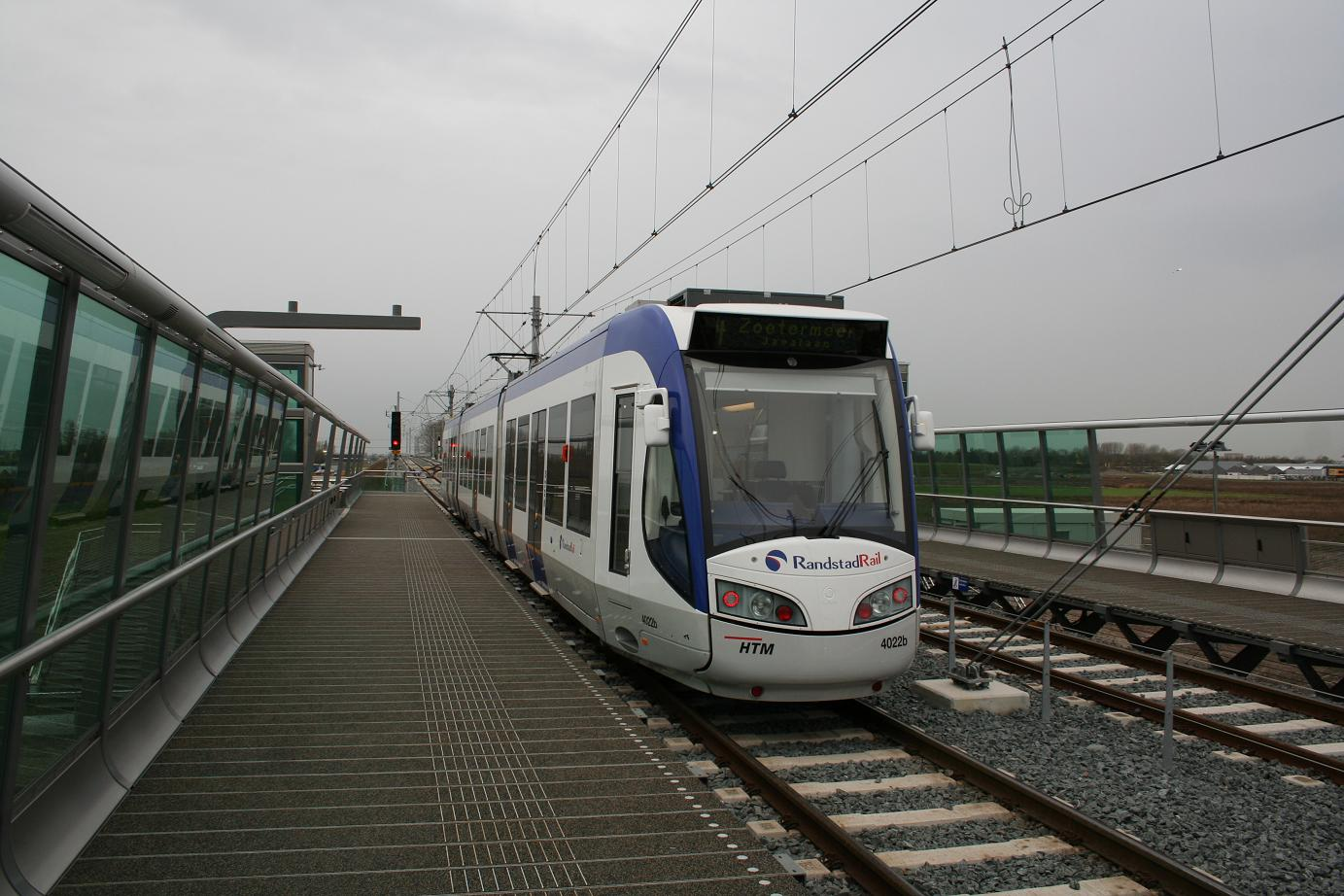

General information
- Location: Netherlands
- Coordinates: 52°03′13″N 4°32′15″E
- Platforms: 2

History
- Opened: 29 October 2006; 19 years ago

Services
Preceding station	RandstadRail	Following station
Van Tuyllpark towards Lansingerland-Zoetermeer	Line 4 (HTM)	Oosterheem towards De Uithof
Location
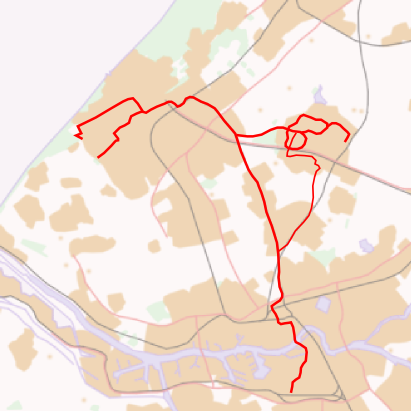
- Location within RandstadRail network

Javalaan is a RandstadRail station in Zoetermeer, Netherlands. It was the final stop of line 4 prior to the 2019 extension to Lansingerland-Zoetermeer railway station, located on a viaduct. The station opened on 8 October 2007, as part of the Oosterheemlijn (Seghwaert - Javalaan).

== Train services ==
The following services are currently available at Javalaan:

Service	Route	Material	Frequency
RR4	De Uithof - Beresteinaan - Bouwlustlaan - De Rade - Dedemsvaart - Zuidwoldepad - Leyenburg - Monnickendamplein - Tienhovenselaan - Dierenselaan - De La Reyweg - Monstersestraat - MCH Westeinde - Brouwersgracht - Grote Markt - Spui - Den Haag Centraal - Beatrixkwartier - Laan van NOI - Voorburg 't Loo - Leidschendam-Voorburg - Forepark - Leidschenveen - Voorweg (Low Level) - Centrum West - Stadhuis - Palenstein - Seghwaert - Willem Dreeslaan - Oosterheem - Javalaan - Van Tuyllpark - Lansingerland-Zoetermeer	HTM RegioCitadis Tram	6x per hour (Monday - Saturday, Every 10 Minutes), 5x per hour (Sundays, Every 12 Minutes), 4x per hour (Evenings, after 8pm, Every 15 Minutes)

== Gallery ==
RandstadRail network map.

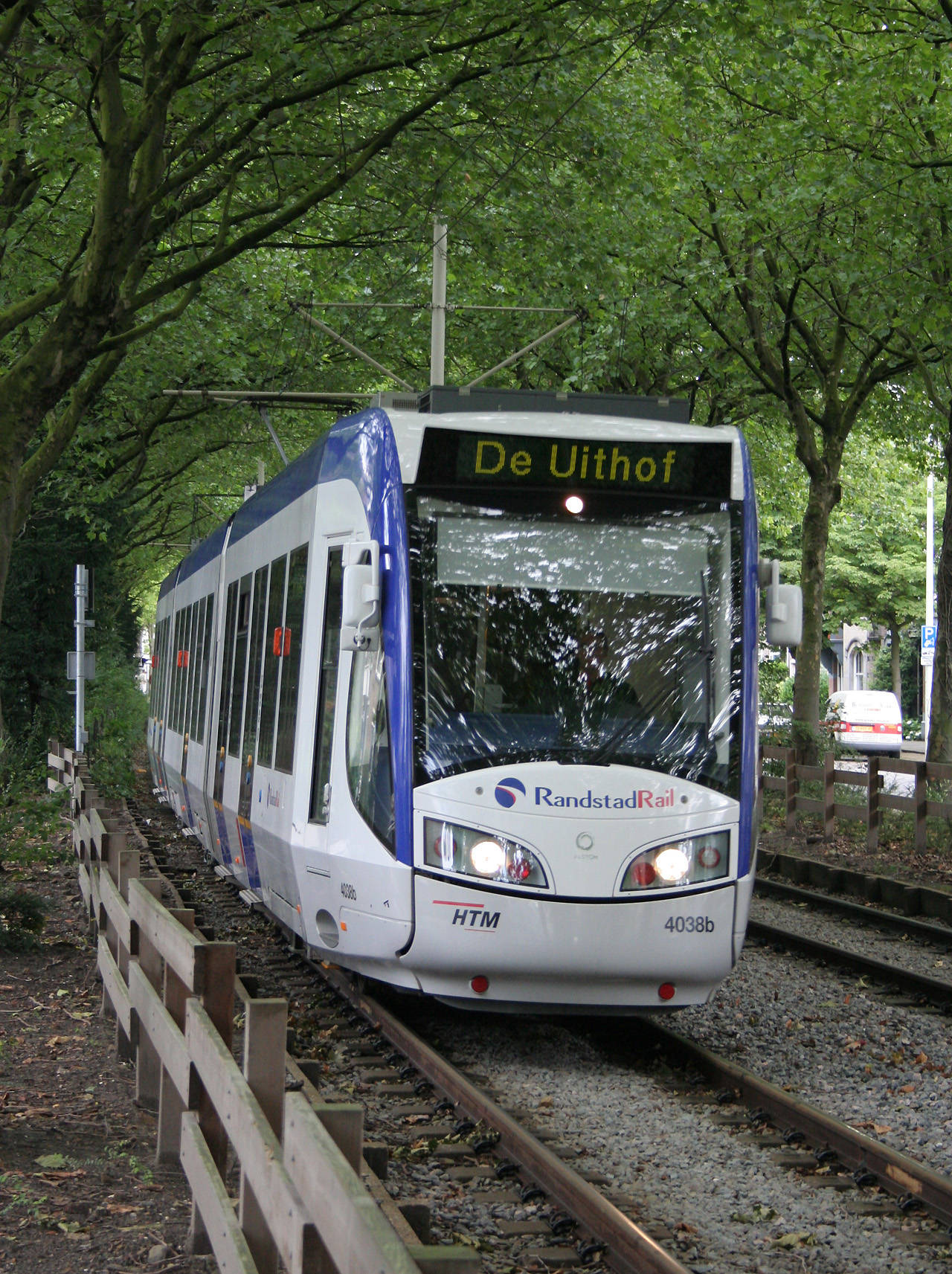
A RegioCitadis on RR4.

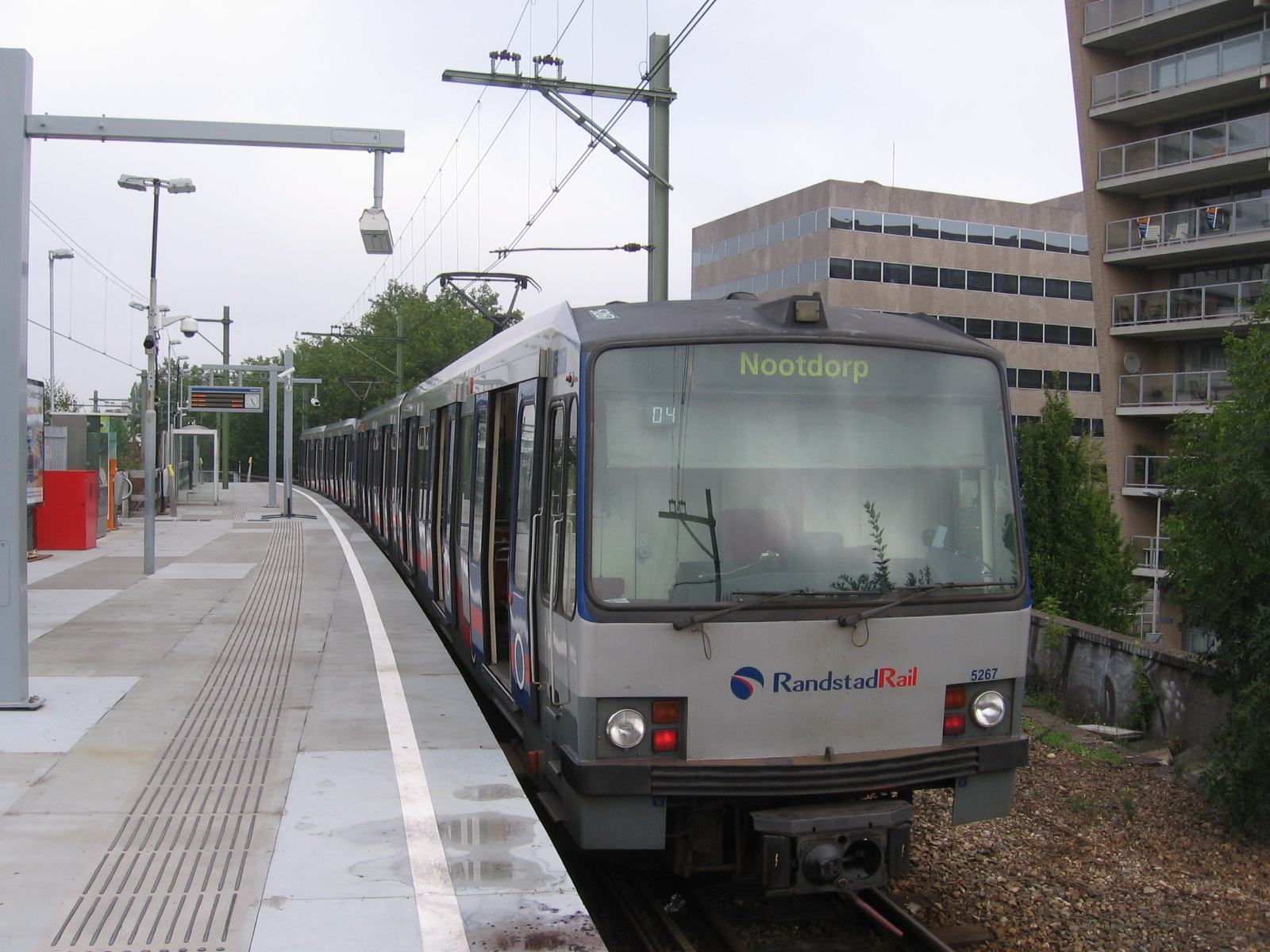
An RET metro set that was converted for RandstadRail operation.

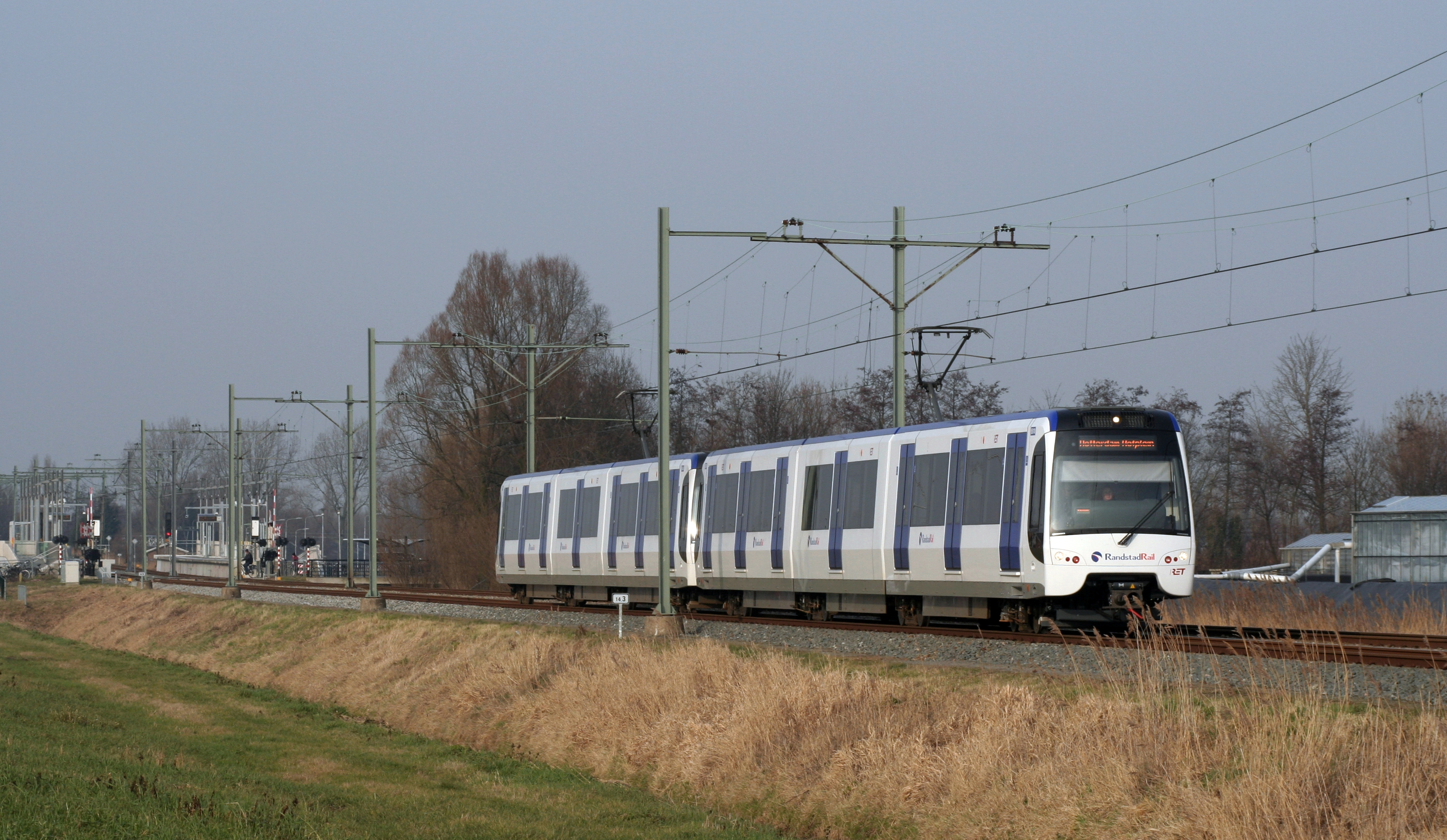
A new RET RandstadRail set, which replaced the metro sets.
