= Zebra clock =

Coordinates: 52.081908°N 4.322316°E

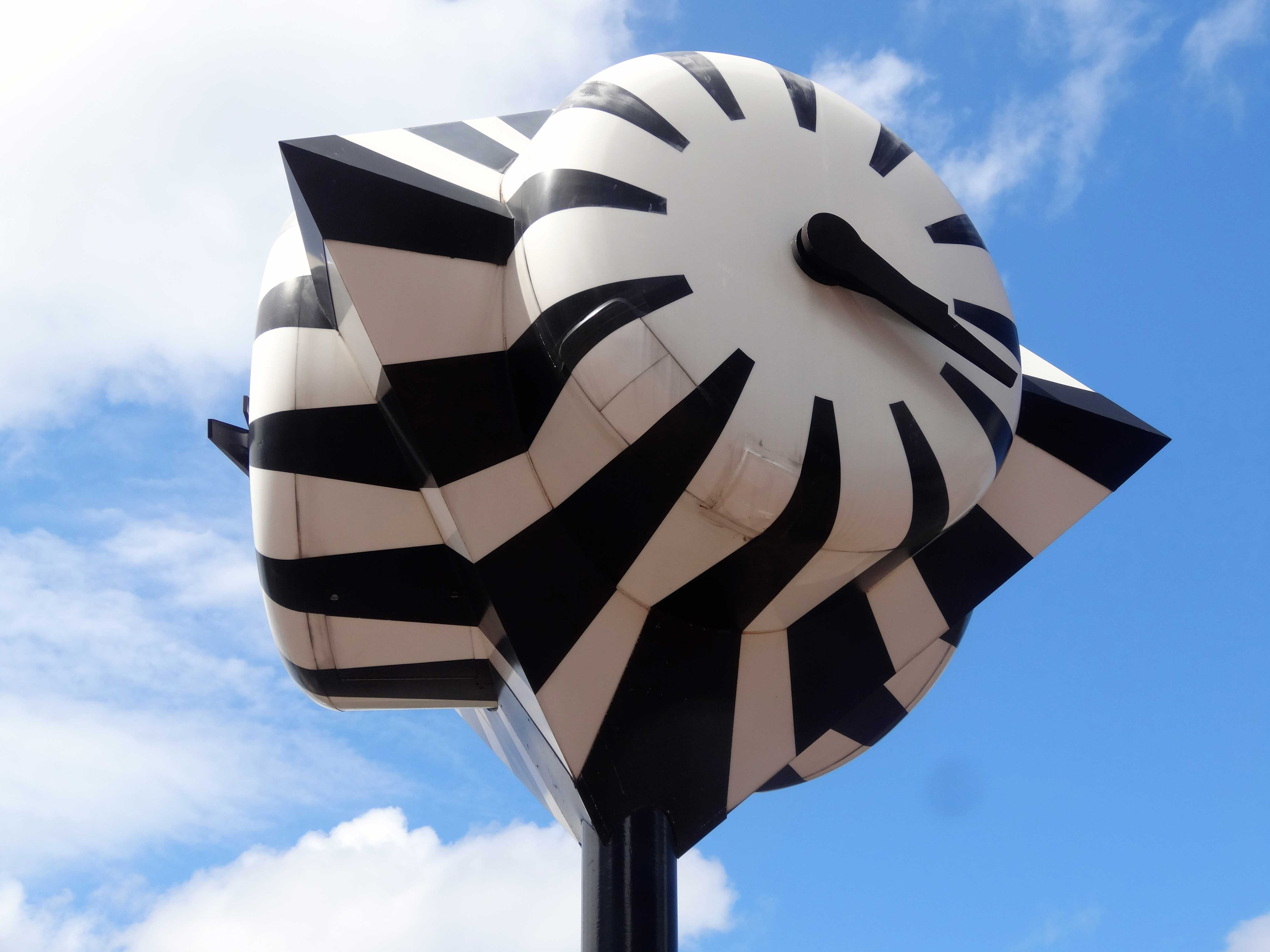

The Monumental Clock [Dutch: Monumentale klok], commonly known as the Zebra clock [Dutch: Zebraklok], is a street clock and work of public art on the Bezuidenhoutseweg street side of the Koningin Julianaplein square, next to Den Haag central railway station in The Hague, Netherlands. It is a local landmark and popular as a meeting-place for people arriving or departing the city by train.

It was installed in 1977 by artist Jaap Karman. It stands 8 meters tall, it has three matching sides with moulded plastic faces of black and white stripes indicating the position of the hours, and is internally lit. It has been destroyed by fire and restored twice - a few months after installation and again in 1985. The clock was temporarily removed from 1997 to 2002, and again from 2008 to 2011 for renovations to the square and station precinct.
