= Bombing of the Bezuidenhout =

1945 British military error during WWII

- Part of World War II Operation Crossbow
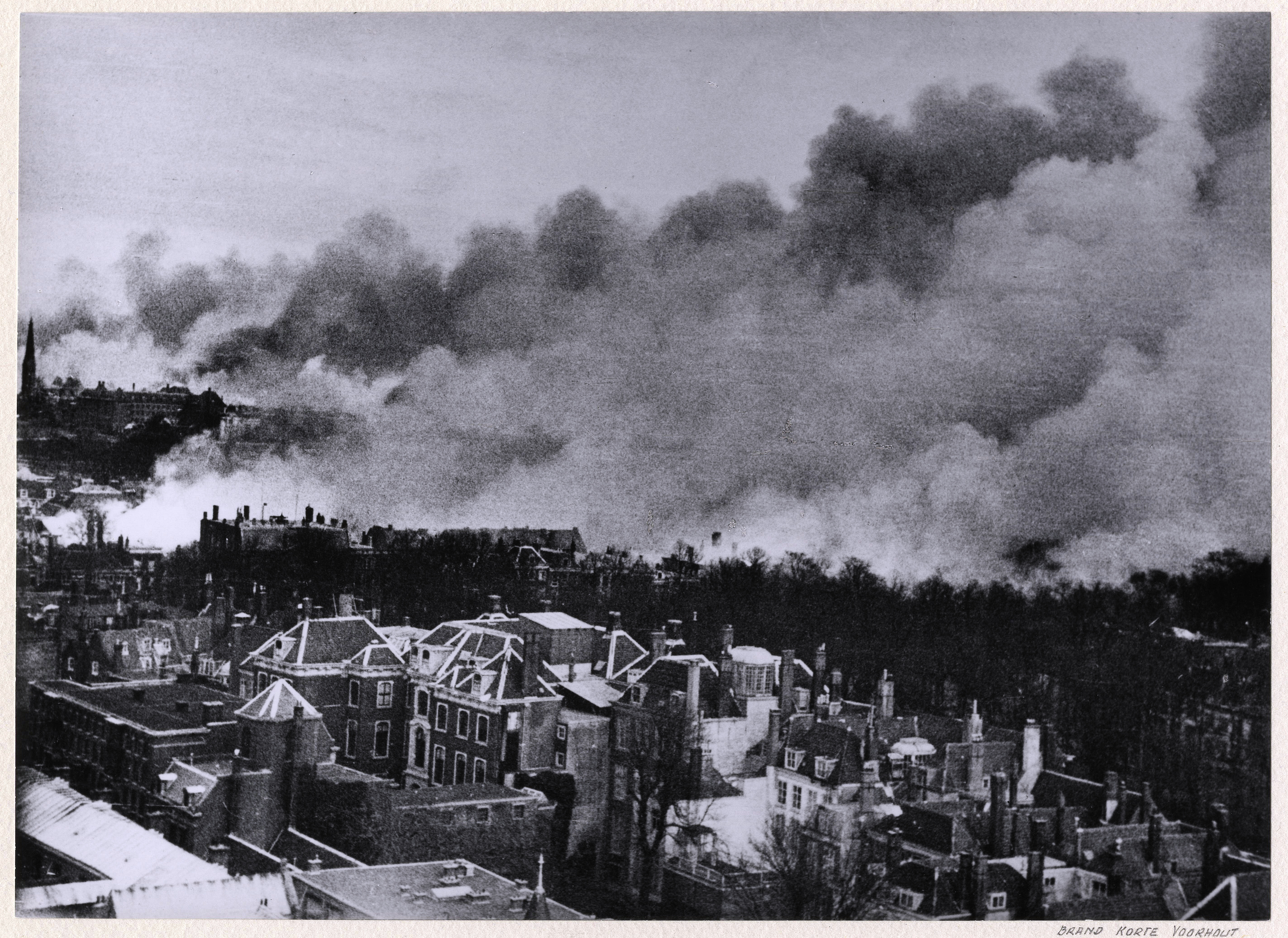
- Bezuidenhout burning, shortly after the bombing, photographed from the tower of the Church of James the Greater, at Parkstraat in The Hague
Date	3 March 1945
Location	The Hague, Netherlands 52°05′17″N 04°20′41″E

Belligerents
United Kingdom	Germany

Commanders and leaders
Air Marshal Sir Arthur Coningham	

Units involved
Second Tactical Air Force: No. 137 Wing; No. 139 Wing	902nd Artillery Regiment z.V. (Motorised)

Strength
56 Boston & Mitchell bombers	

Casualties and losses
- Bezuidenhout civilian casualties: 532 killed, 344 injured, ±30,000 left homeless
- Location within South Holland

The bombing of the Bezuidenhout (Dutch: bombardement op het Bezuidenhout) took place on 3 March 1945, when the Royal Air Force mistakenly bombed the Bezuidenhout neighbourhood in the Dutch city of The Hague, resulting in the death of 532 people.

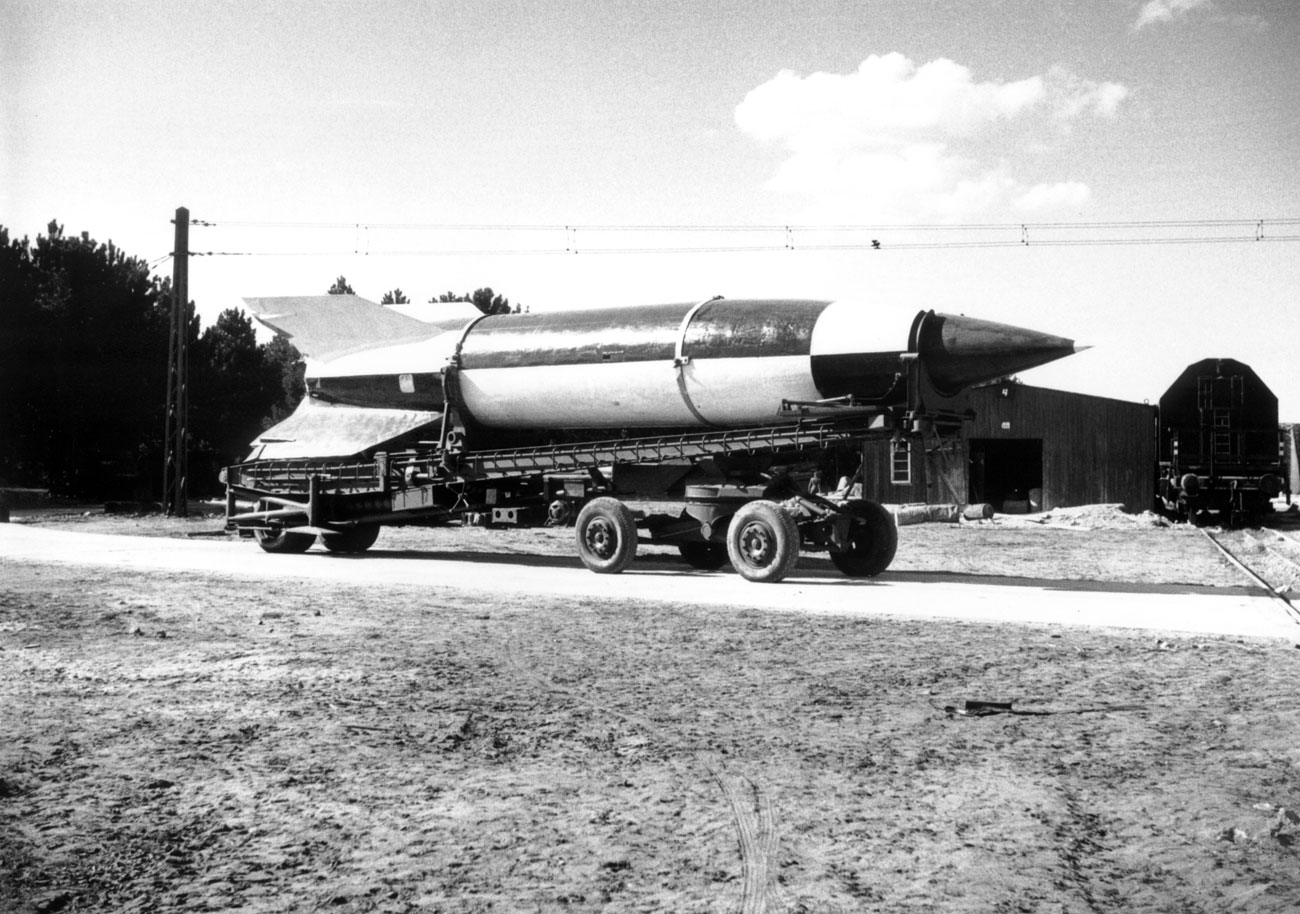
Motorised Nazi artillery launched 1,027 V-2 rockets at London from The Hague – 79 failed at launch, 600 reached London

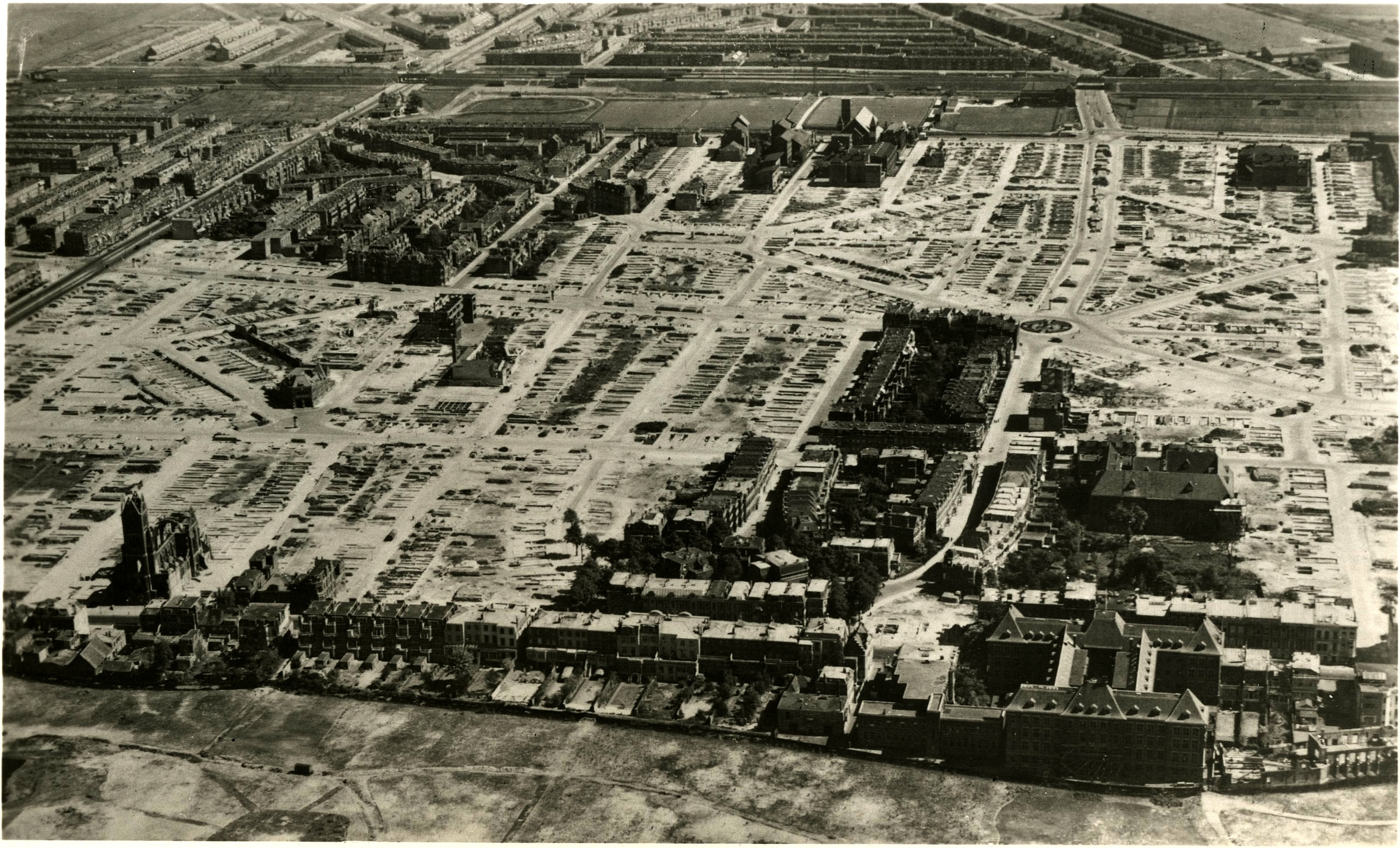
The desolate landscape of the Hague neighbourhood of Bezuidenhout in 1946. At the front the Bezuidenhoutseweg road. Completely at the back, behind the railroad tracks, a part of the municipality of Voorburg.

== Bombing ==
On the morning of 3 March 1945, 51 medium and light bombers of the North American B-25 Mitchell and Douglas Boston types from No. 137 and No. 139 wings of the Second Tactical Air Force took off from Melsbroek near Brussels and Vitry in Northern France with a payload of 67,000 kg of high-explosive bombs.

The British bombers were intended to bomb the Haagse Bos ("Forest of the Hague") district where the Germans had installed V-2 launching facilities that had been used to attack English cities. However, the pilots were issued with the wrong coordinates (vertical and horizontal interchanged), so the navigational instruments of the bombers had been set incorrectly, and combined with low fog and clouds which obscured their vision, the bombs were instead dropped on the Bezuidenhout residential neighbourhood. Eventually, a wind force of 9 instead of the expected 5 added to the catastrophe. All bombs missed the rocket installations in the 2.4×0.8 km^{2} (0.9×0.3 sq mi) forest target (Haagse Bos) by 1.2 km (0.7 mi) ("incorrect allowance for the wind"/"map-reading error"), and hit the Bezuidenhout neighbourhood instead.

At 9:08 in the morning the 51 bombers dropped 67 tons of high-explosive bombs on the Bezuidenhout, wreaking widespread destruction.

"Everyone went out and into the street. You saw people running, running, running everywhere. But whichever way you ran, there was fire everywhere."

— Survivor,

At the time, the neighbourhood was more densely populated than usual with evacuees from The Hague and Wassenaar; tens of thousands were left homeless and had to be quartered in the Eastern and Central Netherlands.

== Response ==
Due to insufficient fire engines and firemen (as many of them had been either called up for forced labour in German industry or had gone into hiding to prevent being signed up) the resulting fire was largely unchecked, killing 511 people, including ten firemen at the Schenkkade. In total 532 people were killed by the bombing.

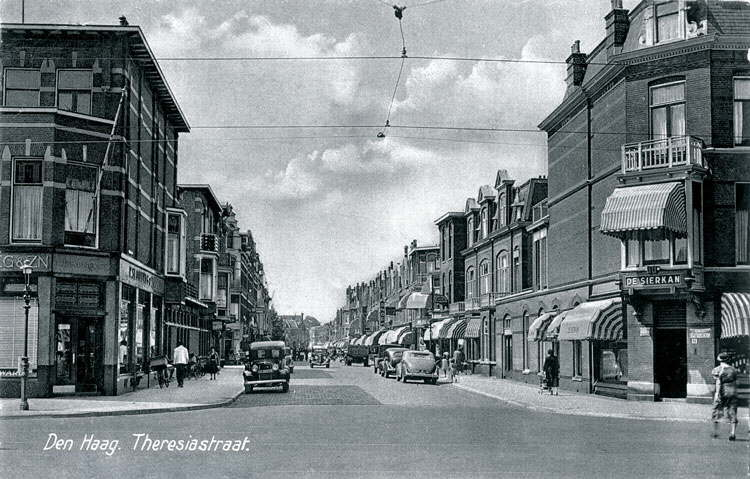
The Theresiastraat in the Bezuidenhout before World War II

As soon as the British realised the extent of the damage, they dropped fliers over the neighbourhood expressing condolences for the civilians who were killed by their error. Trouw, the Dutch resistance newspaper, reported:

The horrors of the war are increasing. We have seen the fires in The Hague after the terrible bombings due to the V2-launching sites. We have seen the column of smoke, drifting to the south and the ordeal of the war has descended upon us in its extended impact. We heard the screaming bombs falling on (the) Bezuidenhout, and the missiles which brought death and misery fell only a hundred metres from us. At the same time we saw the launching and the roaring, flaming V2, holding our breath to see if the launch was successful, if not falling back on the homes of innocent people. It is horrible to see the monsters take off in the middle of the night between the houses, lighting up the skies. One can imagine the terrors that came upon us now that The Hague is a frontline town, bombed continuously for more than ten days. Buildings, burning and smouldering furiously, a town choking from smoke, women and children fleeing, men hauling furniture which they tried to rescue from the chaos. What misery, what distress.

== Commemoration ==
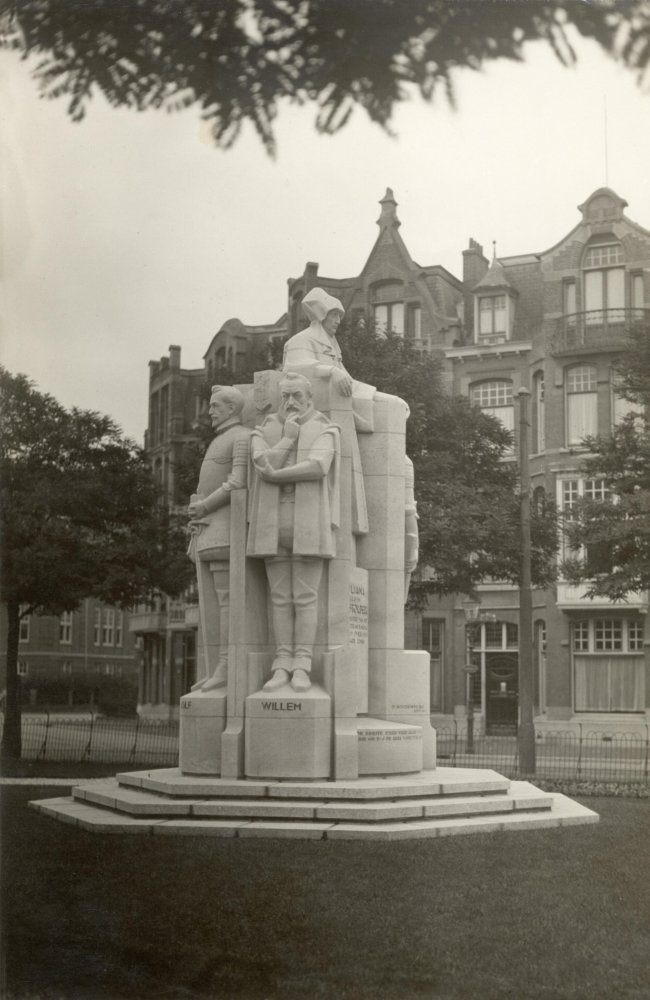
Monument of Juliana of Stolberg and her five sons, which survived the bombing and now doubles as a monument for its victims

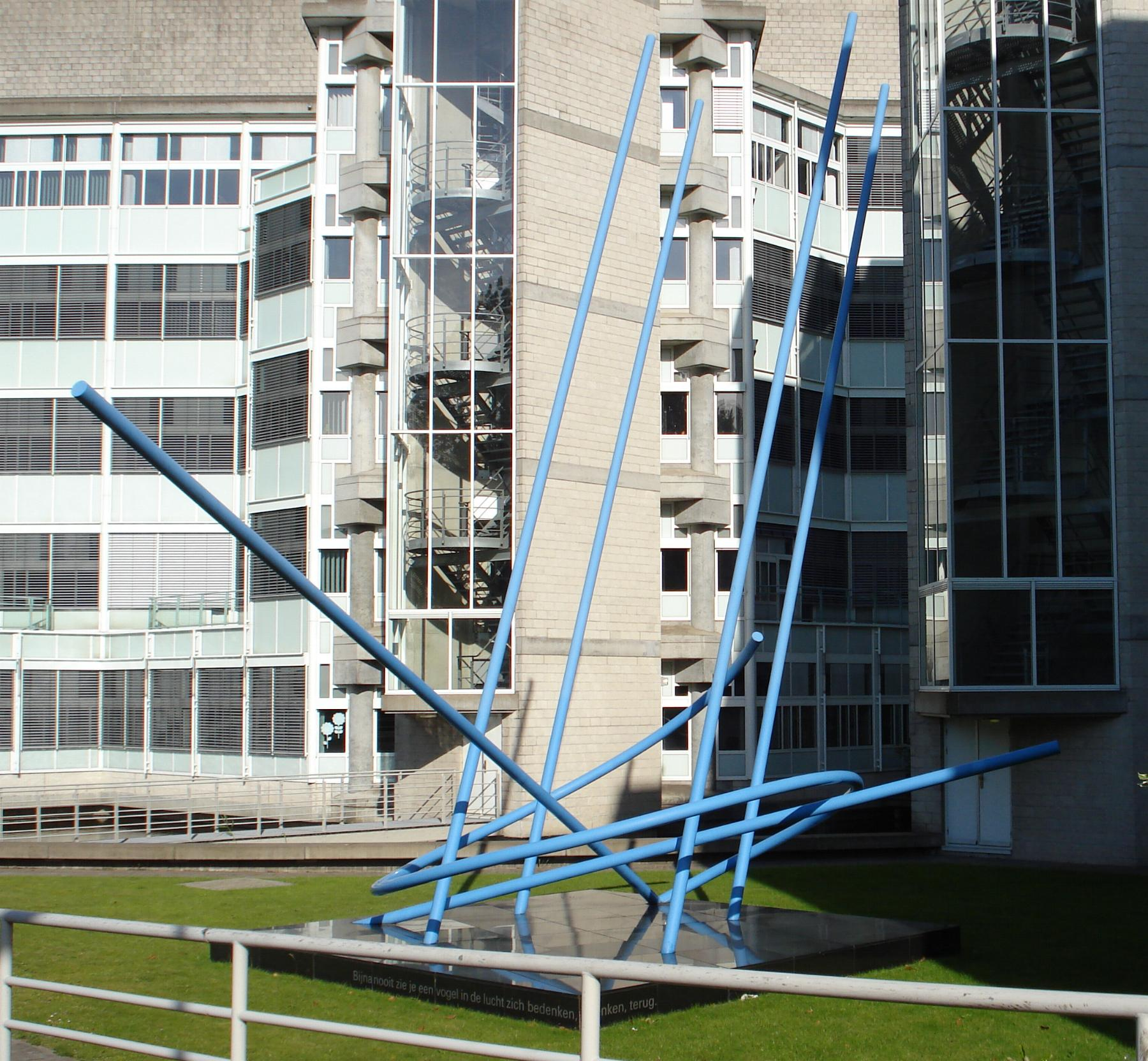
Monument van de menselijke vergissing

The bombing is commemorated every year on the first Sunday after 3 March. In 2011, Mayor Jozias van Aartsen of The Hague as well as the Mayors of Wassenaar and Leidschendam-Voorburg (residents of both towns helped with firefighting and caring for the survivors) were present at the remembrance ceremony, which consisted of a church service, the laying of a wreath at the Monument of the human mistake (Dutch: Monument van de menselijke vergissing) and a remembrance concert in the Royal Conservatory of The Hague. A similar church service and concert were held in 2012.

== Casualties, losses, and damage ==
- 532 fatalities
- 344 wounded
- 30,000 people left homeless
- 3,300 completely destroyed residences
- 3,250 burned out residences
- 3,241 damaged residences
- 391 irreparably damaged residences
- 290 completely destroyed businesses
- 5 completely destroyed churches
- 9 completely destroyed schools
- 10 completely destroyed public buildings

== Gallery ==
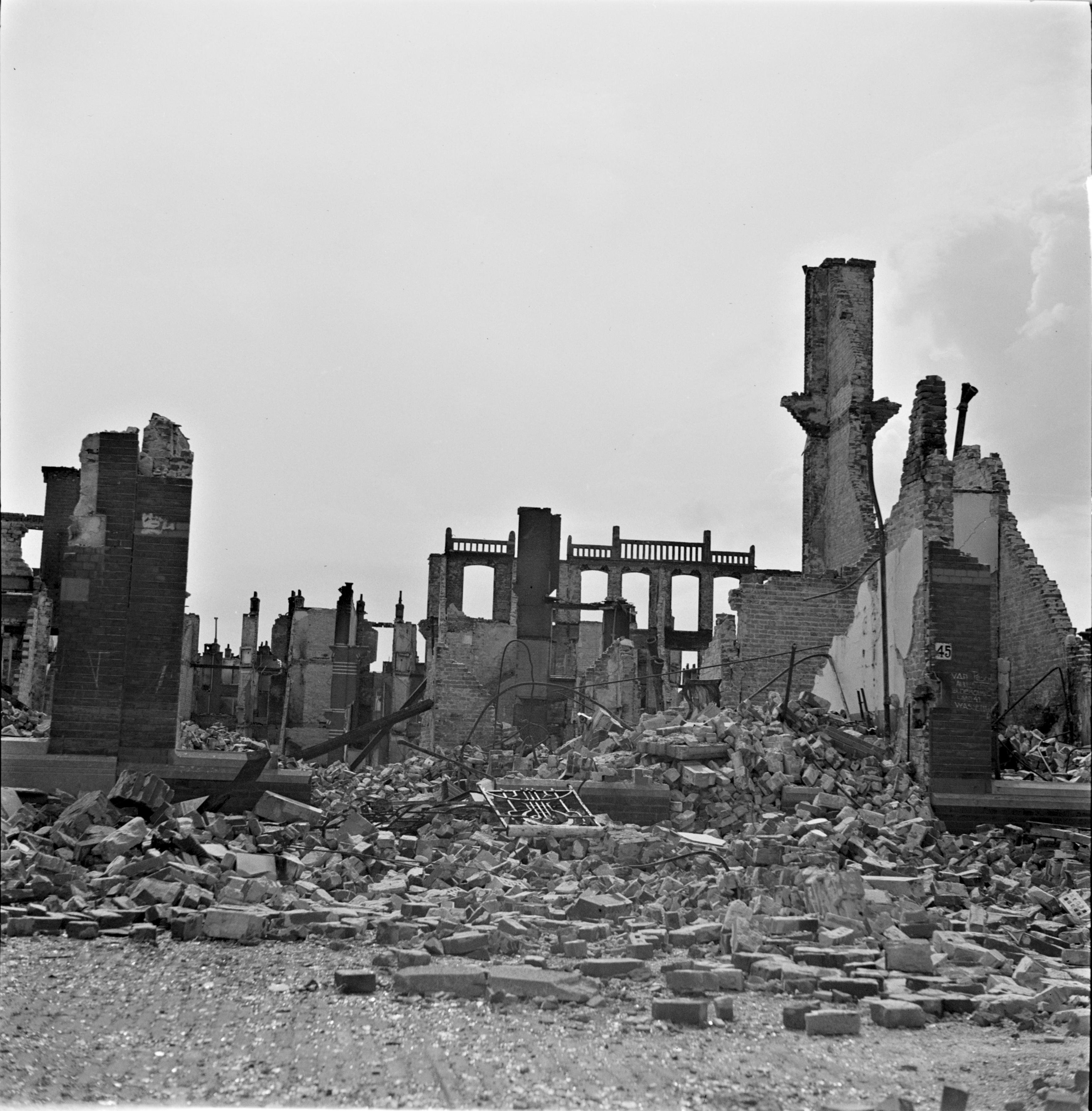
Unknown street in Bezuidenhout, after the bombing

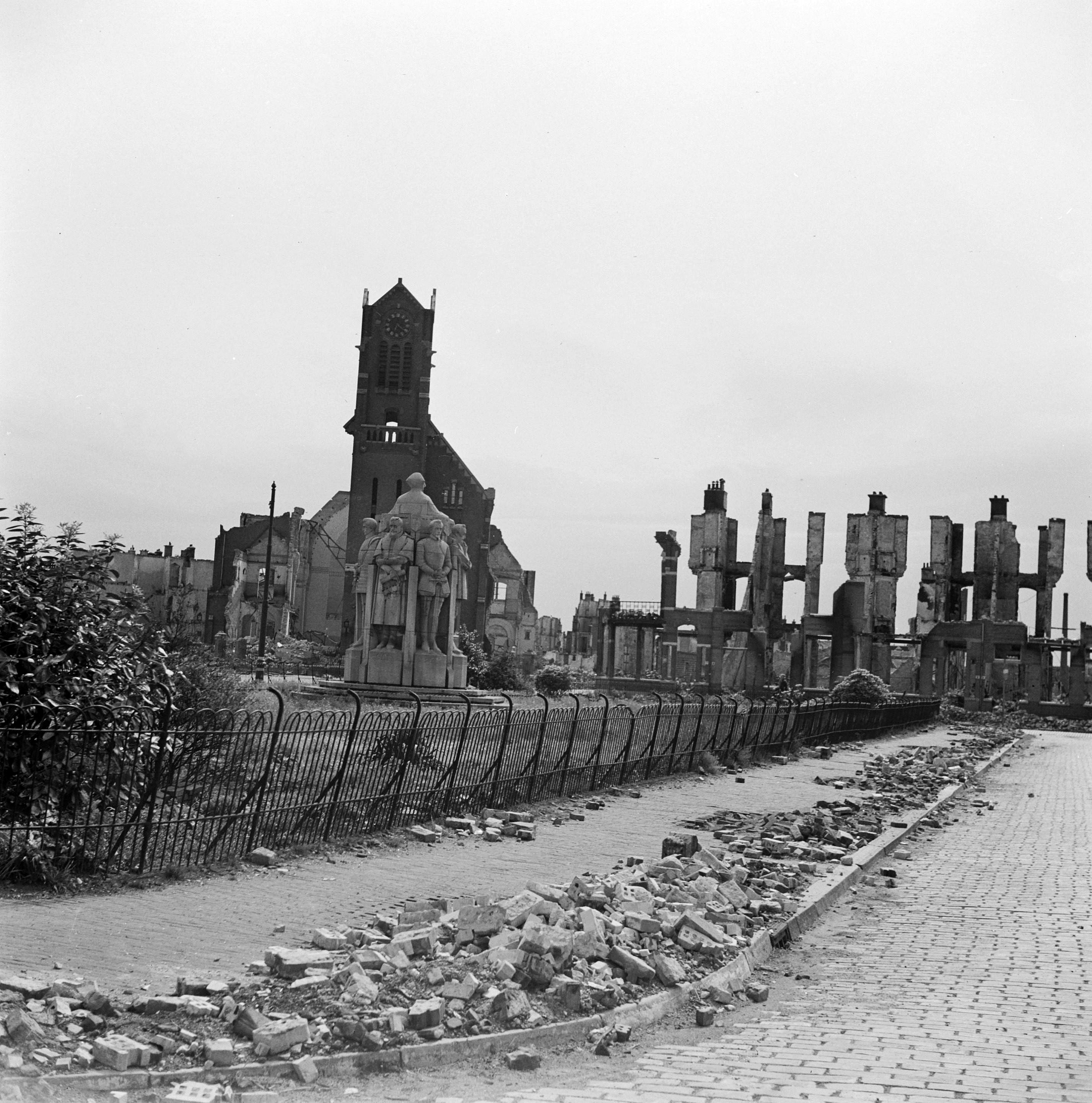
Juliana van Stolberg monument and ruins of the Wilhelmina Church

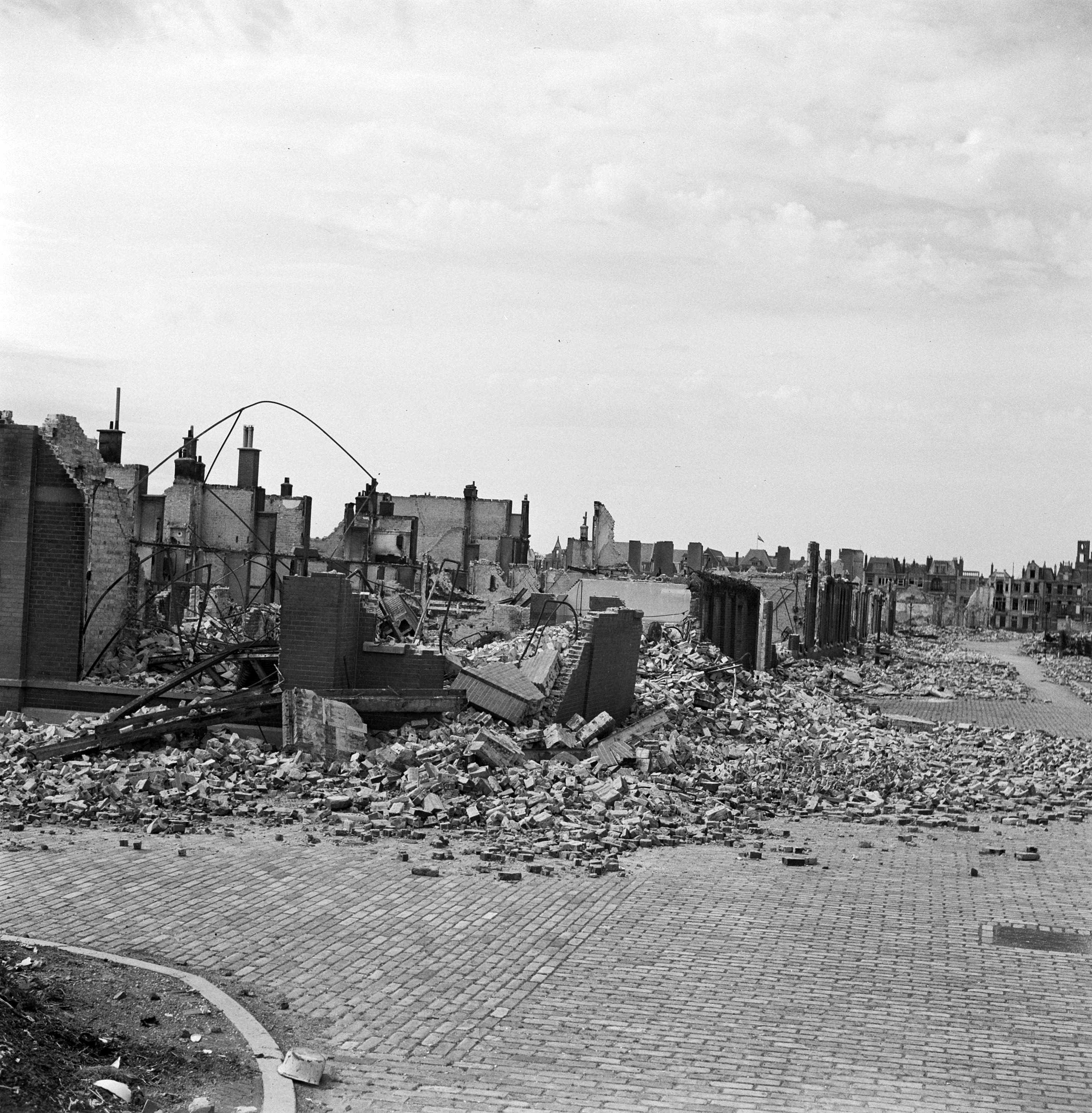
Unknown street in Bezuidenhout, after the bombing

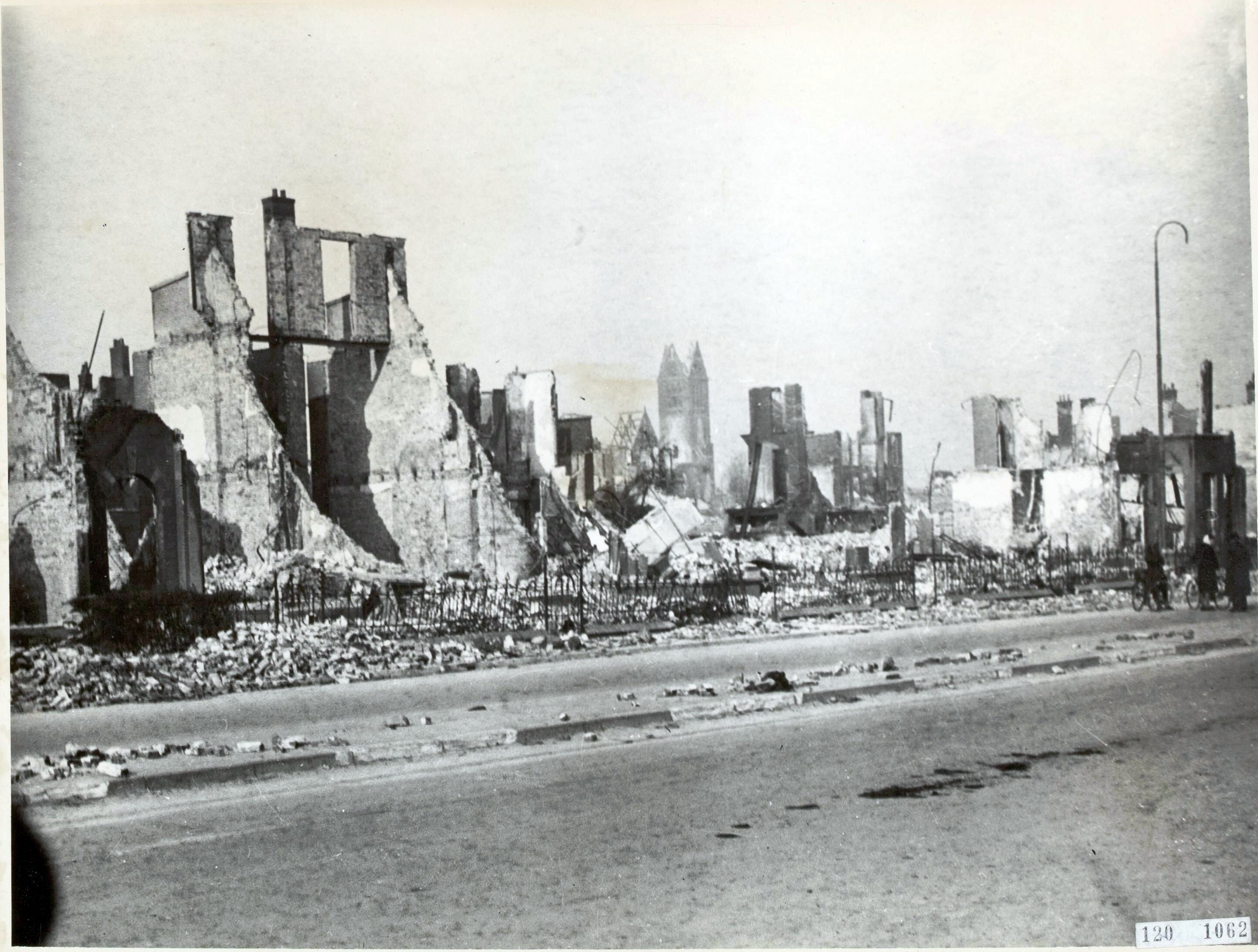
Laan van Nieuw Oost-Indië (street)

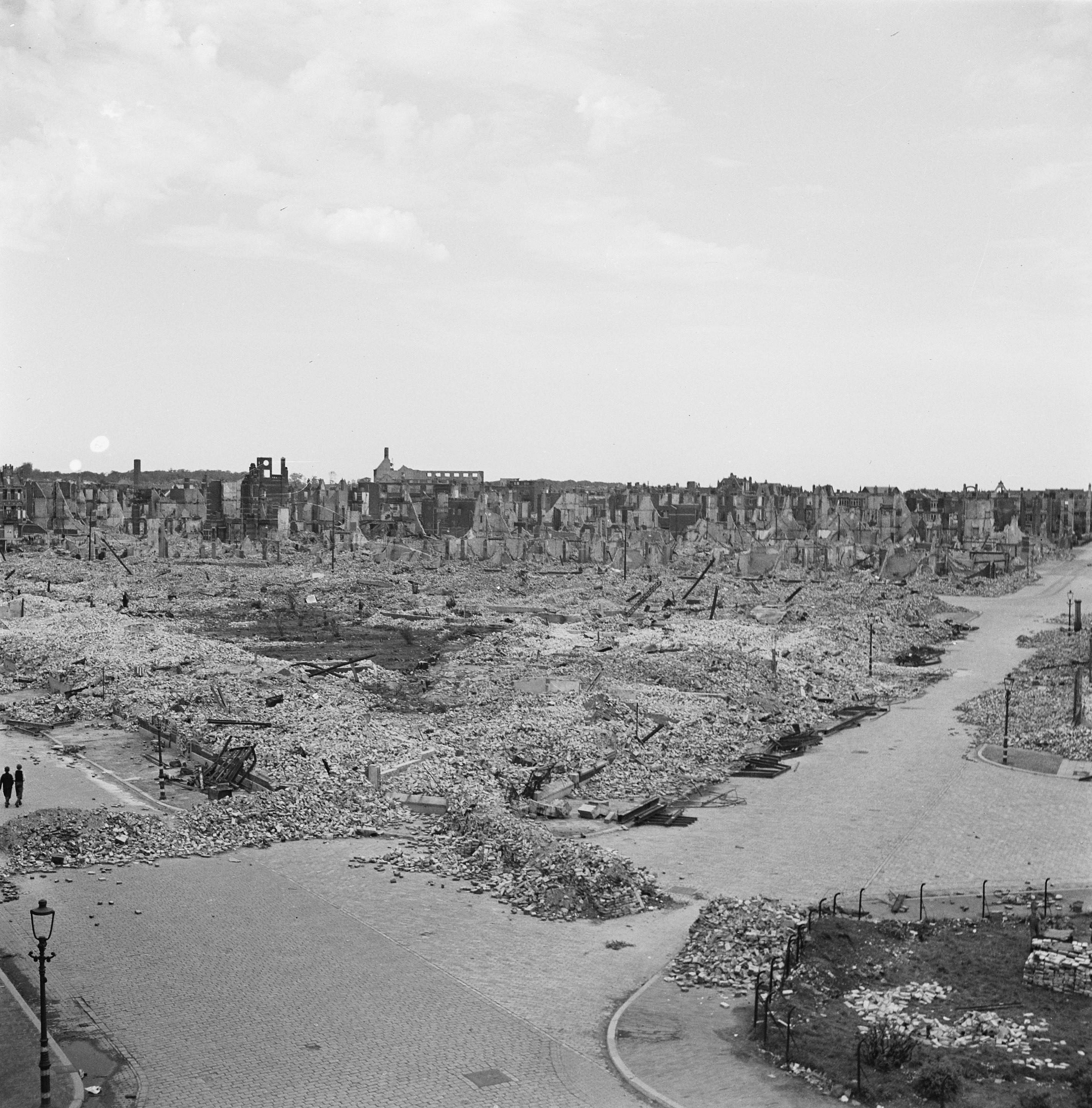
The intense fire caused numerous buildings to collapse entirely

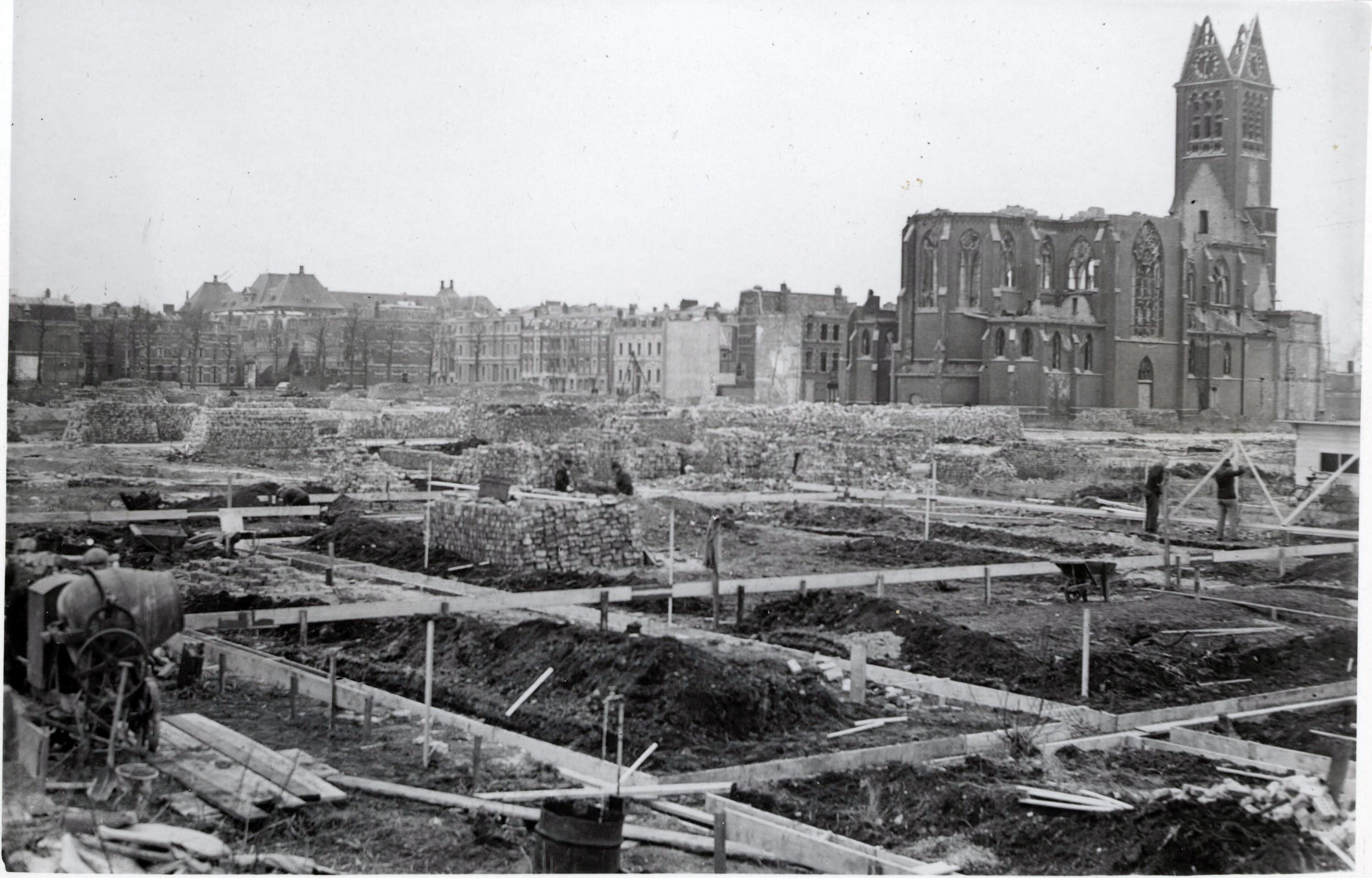
In the background: ruins of the Church of Our Lady of Good Counsel at Bezuidenhoutseweg (street)

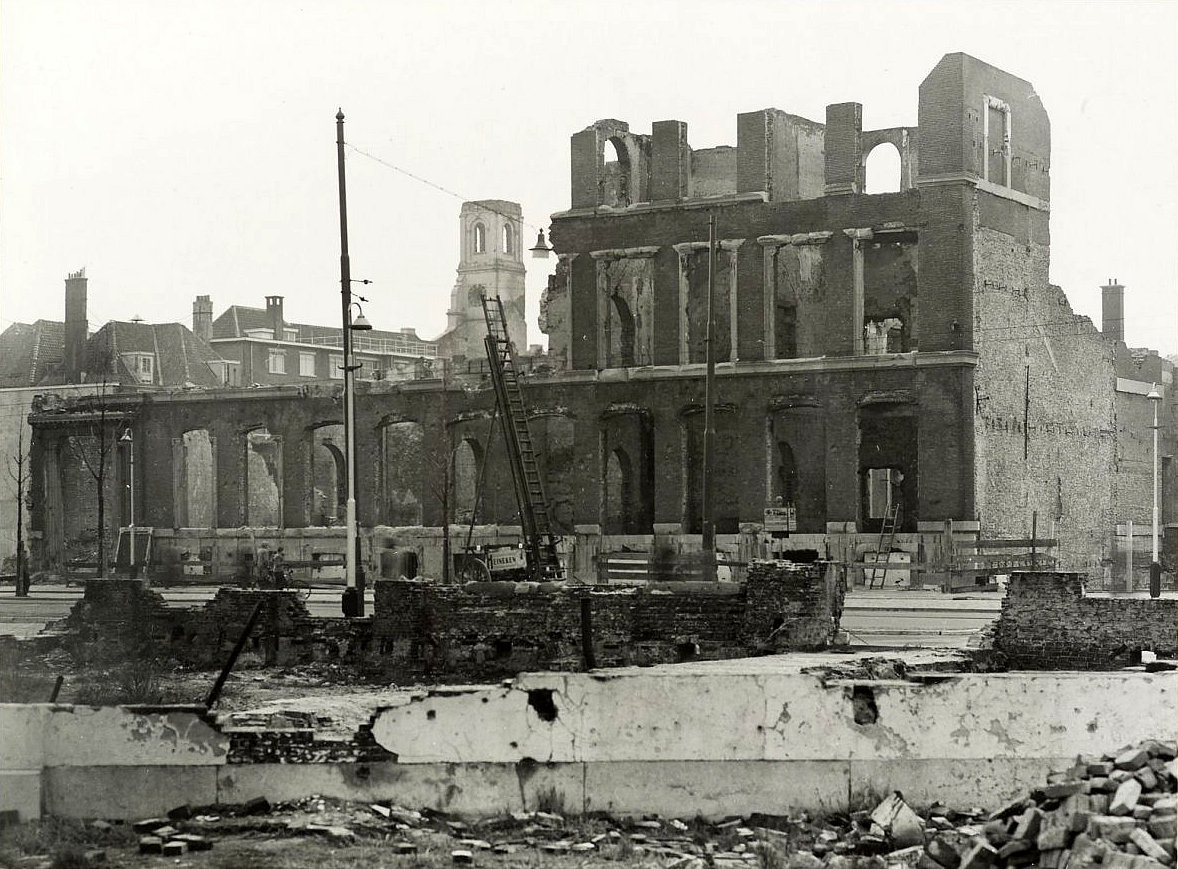
Korte Voorhout (street) at the old city centre

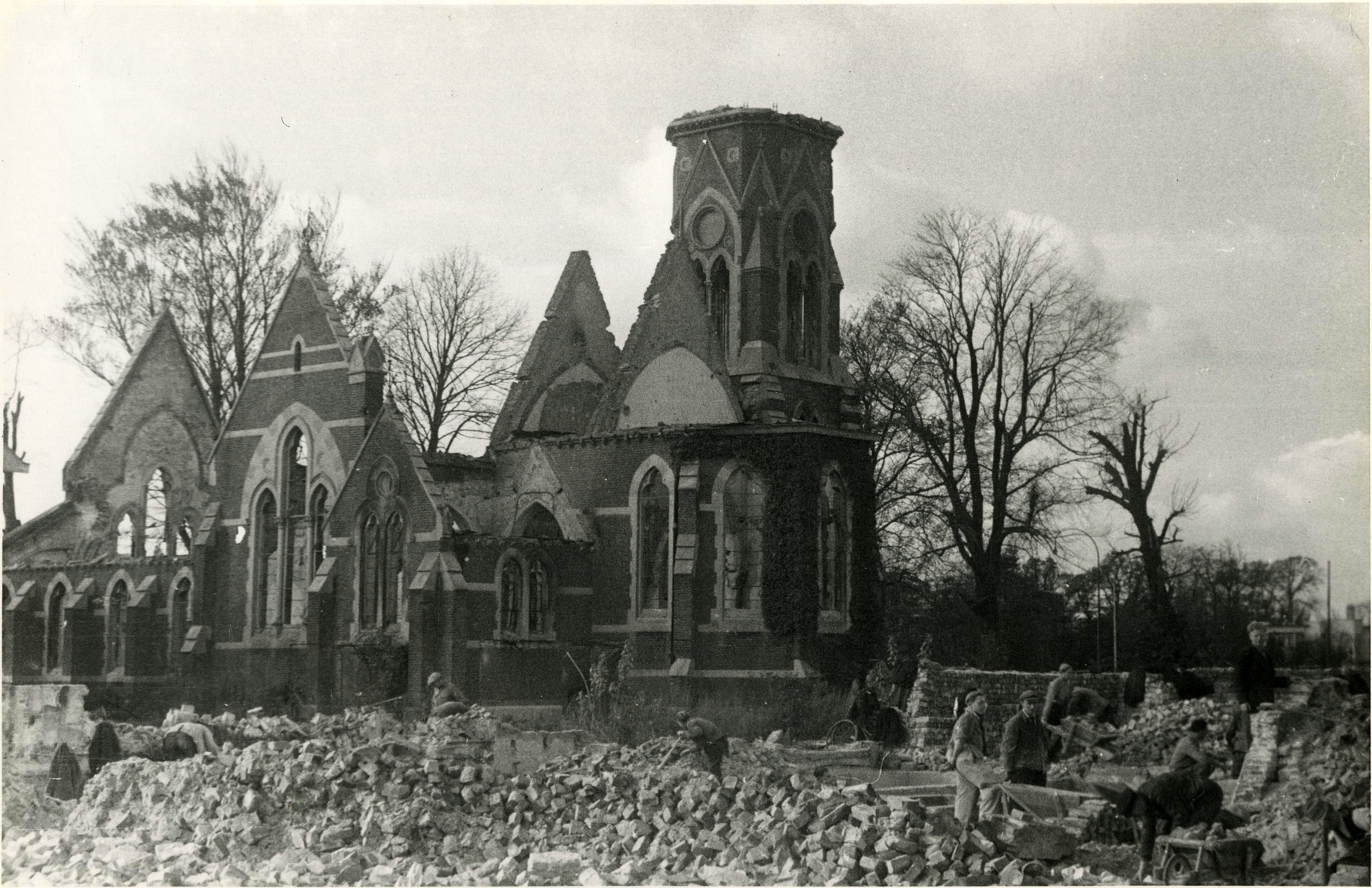
Ruins of the Anglican Church of St. John and St. Philip in The Hague, after the bombing
