= Beatrixkwartier =

- Neighbourhood of The Hague
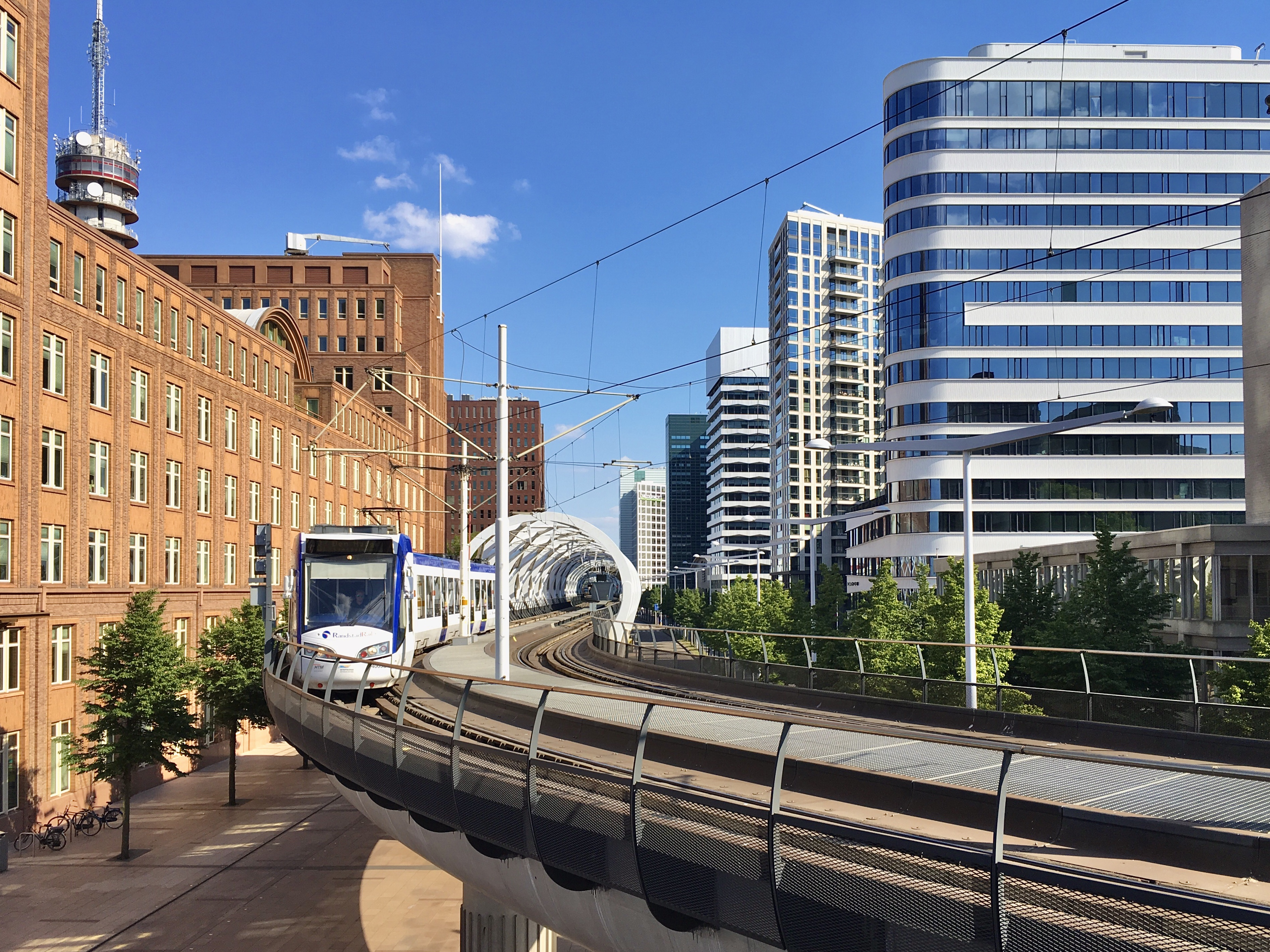
- RandstadRail station Beatrixkwartier, nicknamed The 'Netkous' or Fishnet Stocking, with neighbouring skyscrapers
- Interactive map of Beatrixkwartier
- Coordinates: 52°04′42″N 4°20′16″E
- Country: Netherlands
- Province: South Holland
- Municipality: The Hague
- Borough: Haagse Hout
- Time zone: CET (UTC+01)
  - Summer (DST): CEST (UTC+02)
- Area code: 070

The Beatrixkwartier (literally Beatrix Quarter in Dutch) is a modern financial district in The Hague, near the Central Station, in the Bezuidenhout district. The name was chosen when the Beatrixlaan was renewed. Officially this area is the strip of buildings along the Utrechtsebaan from Nationale Nederlanden to the Palace of Justice. Besides Nationale Nederlanden, many large international companies such as KPN, Siemens, PostNL, Sdu, Deloitte, Q8 and MN Services are located here.

The Beatrixkwartier also hosts the World Trade Center The Hague in the Prinsenhof building.

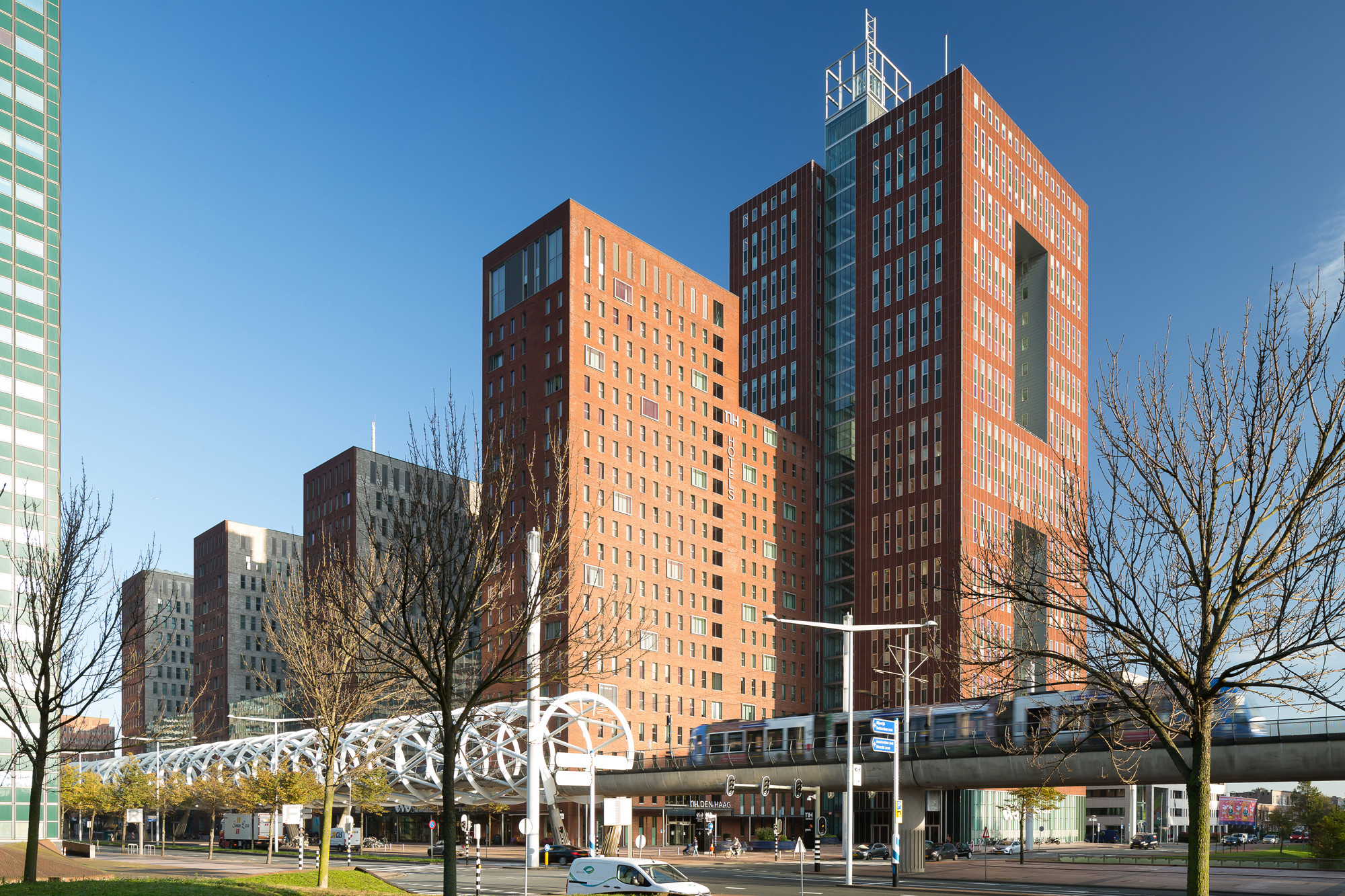
The Prinsenhof building, host to WTC The Hague

The central axis of the quarter is the Prinses Beatrixlaan along with the Beatrixkwartier RandstadRail station halfway past the Netkous viaduct, which opened on October 29, 2006. Furthermore, the neighborhood is intersected by the A12 motorway.

== Buildings ==
- CentreCourt
- Prinsenhof
- Haagse Poort
- Beatrixpark
- Monarch
- Siemens building
- KPN building
- Silver Tower
- Green Tower
