= Oosterheem =

Coordinates: 52.066°N 4.539°E

Oosterheem is one of the districts (wijken) of Zoetermeer. It lies in the north-east, near Benthuizen. There is a lot of building going on, and it is one of the most recent districts of Zoetermeer.

Oosterheem has 23,379 citizens, using 8,554 houses. It has a coverage of 363 ha (370,2 ha with water included).
