= Jokinen Plan =

Traffic plan for Amsterdam and The Hague

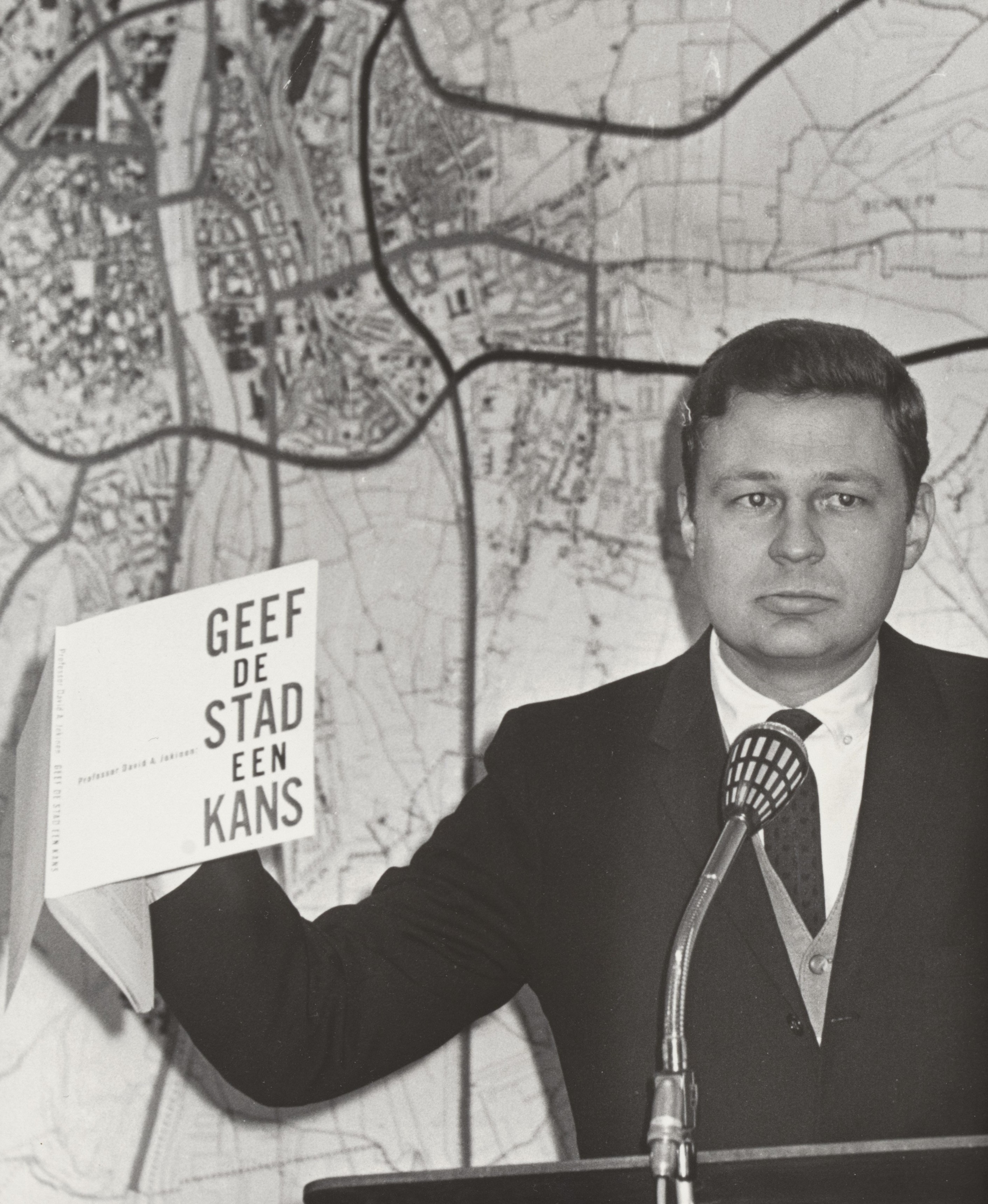
David Jokinen with a copy of his plan for Amsterdam. The title reads Give the city a chance

The Jokinen Plan comprises two reports, drawn up by the American traffic expert David A. Jokinen, on the urban planning of two Dutch cities: for The Hague in 1962, and for Amsterdam in 1967, both set out in a brochure.

== The Hague ==
The first Plan Jokinen, from 1962, related to the station area of The Hague. The Bezuidenhout district in the city, adjacent to The Hague Staatsspoor station, had been largely destroyed in World War II by Allied bombing. Reconstruction had still not started because there was no agreement about what to do. Jokinen saw an opportunity to put an end to the historical situation in which two main stations each served only part of the rail traffic. His plan included the removal of the Staatsspoor station, with Hollands Spoor becoming the central station. In the Bezuidenhout, space was created for a motorway to Scheveningen and a monorail for public transport.

The plan sparked fierce discussions in The Hague. It was not implemented, in part because it was only presented when decision-making had finally reached an advanced stage. Den Haag Centraal railway station now stands on the site of the Staatsspoor station, while the Amsterdam-Rotterdam main line is served by Den Haag HS railway station (Hollands Spoor), 1,600 m away. Part of the motorway that Jokinen proposed was realised in the form of the Utrechtsebaan.

== Amsterdam ==
The second study, from 1967, partly funded by the car lobby group, Stichting Weg (Road Foundation), aimed to revitalise the city of Amsterdam by facilitating accessibility by car. Jokinen made some radical choices to that end. The plan mainly focused on providing easy car access to the city centre. For example, the Singelgracht was to be filled in and replaced by a six-lane highway (comparable to the route of the current s100 inner ring road, but much wider). The impoverished working-class neighbourhoods De Pijp and Kinkerbuurt were to be completely demolished. A major highway (the so-called Zuidelijke Ontsluitingsweg, Southern Access Road) would pass through De Pijp to the inner city ring, surrounded by a central business district inspired by La Défense in Paris, with many high office towers.

Jokinen assumed that, just like in the USA, most people would choose to live in the suburbs and drive to work, although public transport was also taken into account. A new central station would be built in the vicinity of the Weteringcircuit. Dutch Railways adopted the idea and, until the mid-1970s, argued for a major terminal station in De Pijp, dubbed Amsterdam Centrum-Zuid station, which would also connect to two branches of the North-South metro line. Jokinen advocated a system of monorails to connect parking garages on the edge of the city centre with the old city.

Jokinen's ideas arose from other concepts from the same period. His vision to build high towers in park-like environments was very similar to Le Corbusier's ideas for Paris (Plan Voisin). Jokinen's preference for the car resembled the way Robert Moses attempted to transform New York at the same time. In the view of Jokinen, the city centre would be affected somewhat, but not as badly as envisaged by Plan Kaasjager in 1954, which proposed filling in many city centre canals to create roads. Nevertheless, the plan met with fierce criticism and was mostly not adopted by the implementing agencies. Apart from a number of rather large viaducts on the Centrumring, and the fairly large-scale reprofiling of the Wibautstraat after the metro was built, the plan ultimately had hardly any consequences for the city.
