= Haagse Poort =

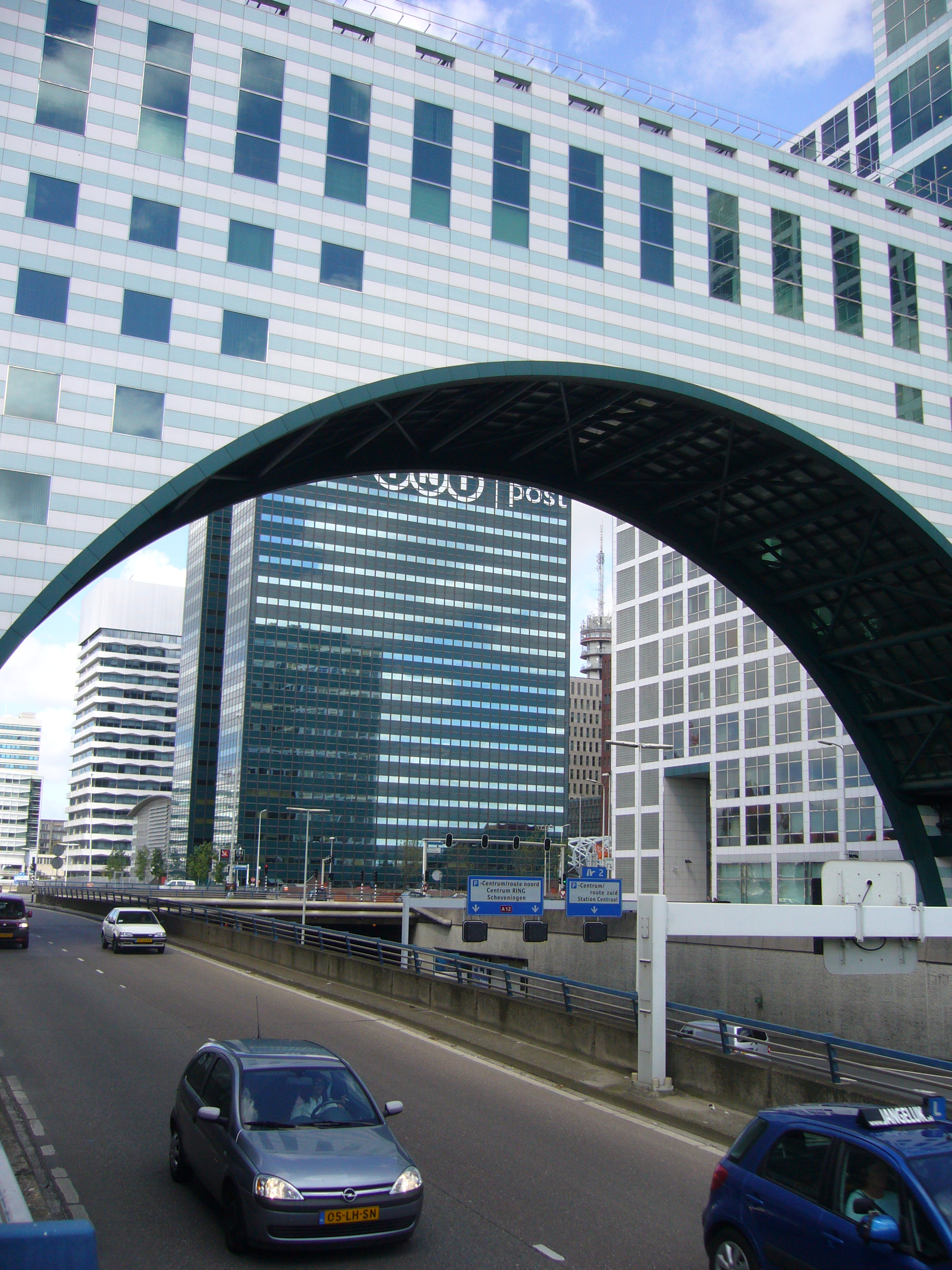
- Interactive map of the Haagse Poort area

General information
- Status: Completed
- Type: Office
- Location: The Hague, Netherlands
- Coordinates: 52°4′37″N 4°20′11″E
- Construction started: 1990
- Completed: 1994
- Owner: Cromwell European REIT

Height
- Roof: 70 m (230 ft)

Technical details
- Floor count: 17
- Floor area: 108,000 m^{2} (1,160,000 sq ft)

Design and construction
- Architects: Kraaijvanger Urbis, Rob Ligtvoet

The Haagse Poort (English: Gate of The Hague) is an office building in The Hague, Netherlands. It is an unusual, asymmetrical structure of 275 metres (902 ft) long that spans the Utrechtsebaan with a large arch. The Haagse Poort consists of a high-rise part and a low-rise part that are connected by the arch from the eighth floor. The tallest part amounts 70 metres (230 ft) and 17 floors. The building offers approximately 108,000 square metres (1,160,000 sq ft) of office space.

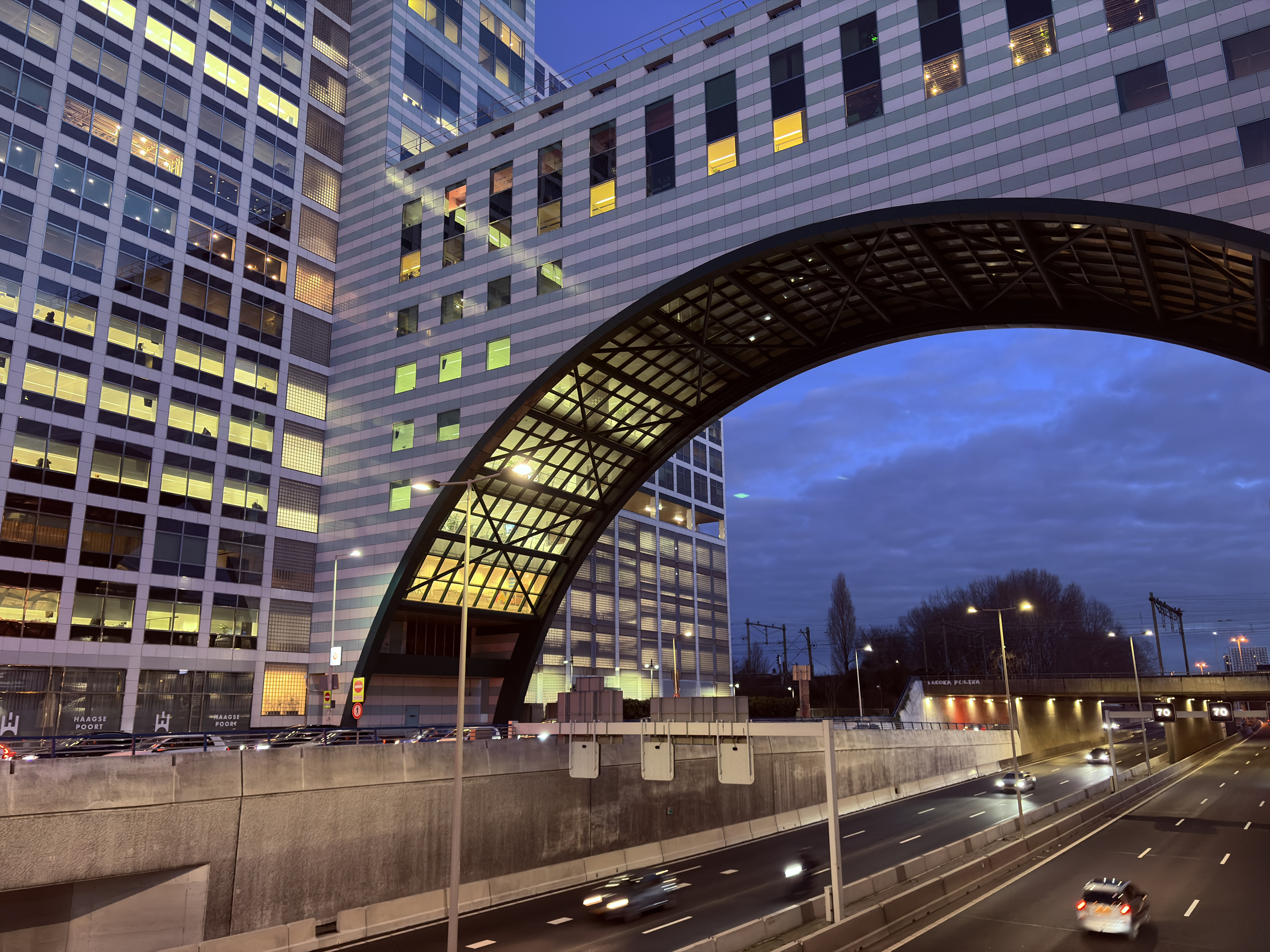
The Haagse Poort over the A12 motorway
