= Monstersestraat RandstadRail station =

Monstersestraat
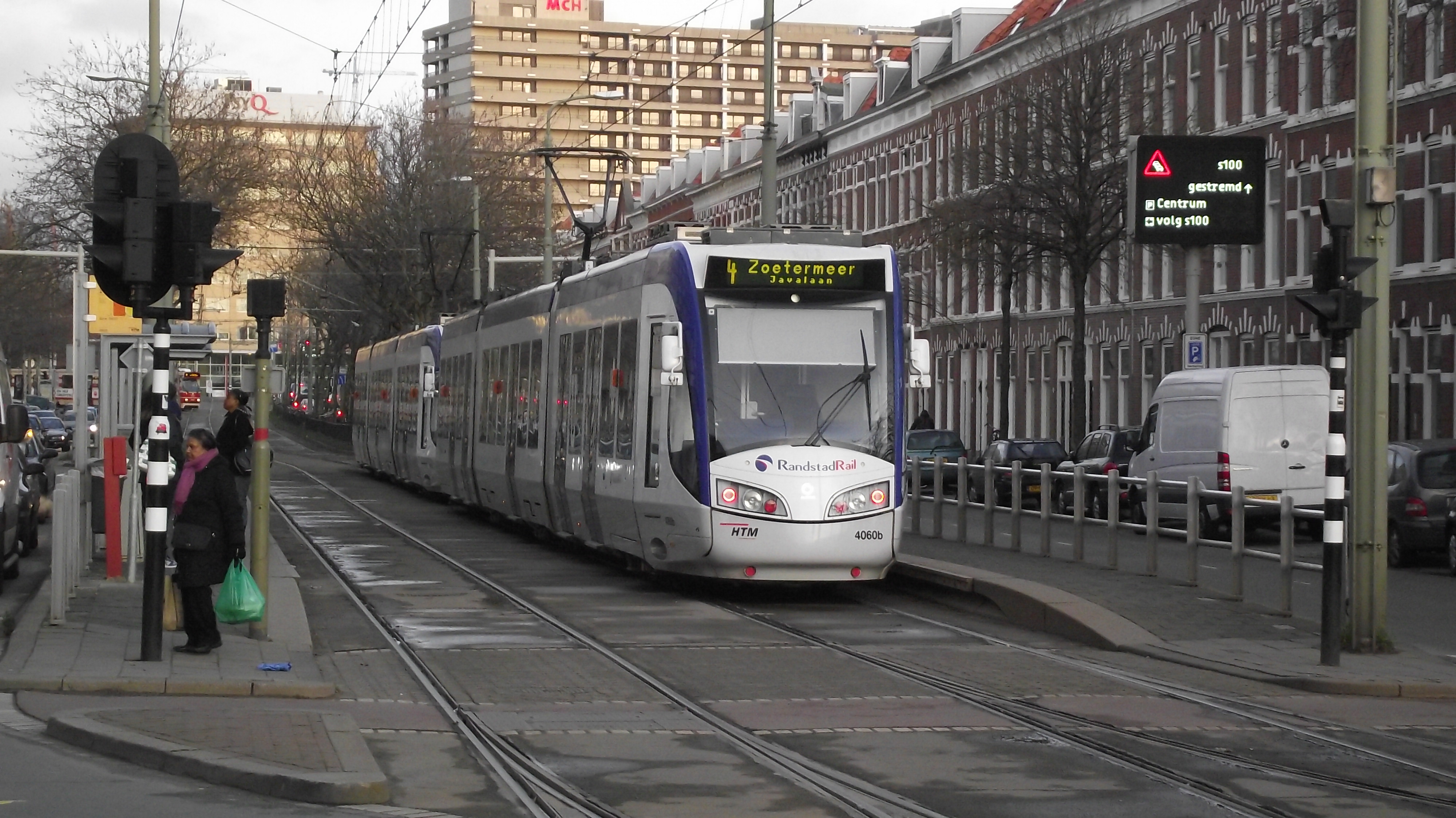

General information
- Location: Netherlands
- Coordinates: 52°04′23″N 4°17′32″E

Services
| Preceding station | RandstadRail | Following station |
|---|---|---|
| HMC Westeinde towards Lansingerland-Zoetermeer | Line 4 (HTM) | De la Reyweg towards De Uithof |
Location
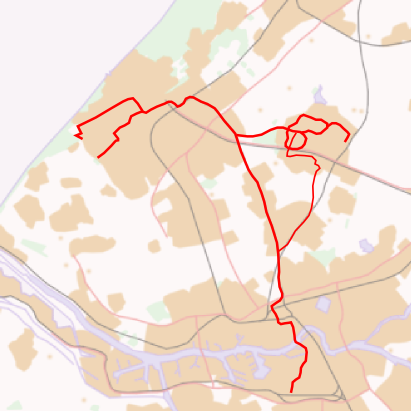
- Location within RandstadRail network

Monstersestraat is a RandstadRail stop in The Hague, Netherlands.

== History ==
The station is a stop for lines 2 and 4 and is on the Loosduinseweg. Line 11 stops nearby on the Tripstraat.

== RandstadRail services ==
The following services currently call at Monstersestraat:

| Service | Route | Material | Frequency |
|---|---|---|---|
| RR4 | De Uithof - Beresteinaan - Bouwlustlaan - De Rade - Dedemsvaart - Zuidwoldepad- Leyenburg - Monnickendamplein - Tienhovenselaan - Dierenselaan - De la Reyweg - Monstersestraat - HMC Westeinde - Brouwersgracht - Grote Markt - Spui - Den Haag Centraal - Beatrixkwartier - Laan van NOI - Voorburg 't Loo - Leidschendam-Voorburg - Forepark - Leidschenveen - Voorweg (Low Level) - Centrum West - Stadhuis - Palenstein - Seghwaert - Willem Dreeslaan - Oosterheem - Javalaan - Van Tuyllpark - Lansingerland-Zoetermeer | HTM RegioCitadis Tram | 6x per hour (Monday - Saturday, Every 10 Minutes), 4x per hour (Sundays and evenings, after 7pm, Every 15 Minutes), 12x per hour (Workdays, rush hours, Every 5 minutes to Zoetermeer) |

== Tram Services ==
| Service | Operator | Route |
|---|---|---|
| 2 | HTM | Kraayensteinlaan - Kapelaan Meereboerweg - Loosduinse Hoofdstraat - Burgemeester Hovylaan - Buitentuinen - Walnootstraat - Thorbeckelaan - Nieuwendamlaan - Laan van Eik en Duinen - Kamperfoeliestraat - Valkenboslaan - Fahrenheitstraat - De la Reyweg - Monstersestraat - HMC Westeinde - Brouwersgracht - Grote Markt - Spui - Centraal Station - Ternoot - Oostinje - Stuyvesantstraat - Station Laan van NOI - Bruijnings Ingenhoeslaan - Mgr. van Steelaan - Prinses Beatrixlaan - Voorburg 't Loo - Elzendreef - Essesteijn - Leidsenhage - HMC Antoniushove |

== Connecting Tram Service ==
| Service | Operator | Route |
|---|---|---|
| 11 | HTM | Strandweg - Vuurbaakstraat - Duinstraat - Doornstraat - Statenlaan - Willem de Zwijgerlaan - Boreelstraat - Houtrust - Groot Hertoginnelaan - Laan van Meerdervoort - Weimarstraat - Loosduinseweg - Delftselaan - Haagse Markt - Hoefkade - Wouwermanstraat - Jacob Catsstraat - Station Hollands Spoor - Rijswijkseplein |

== Gallery ==
RandstadRail Network Map

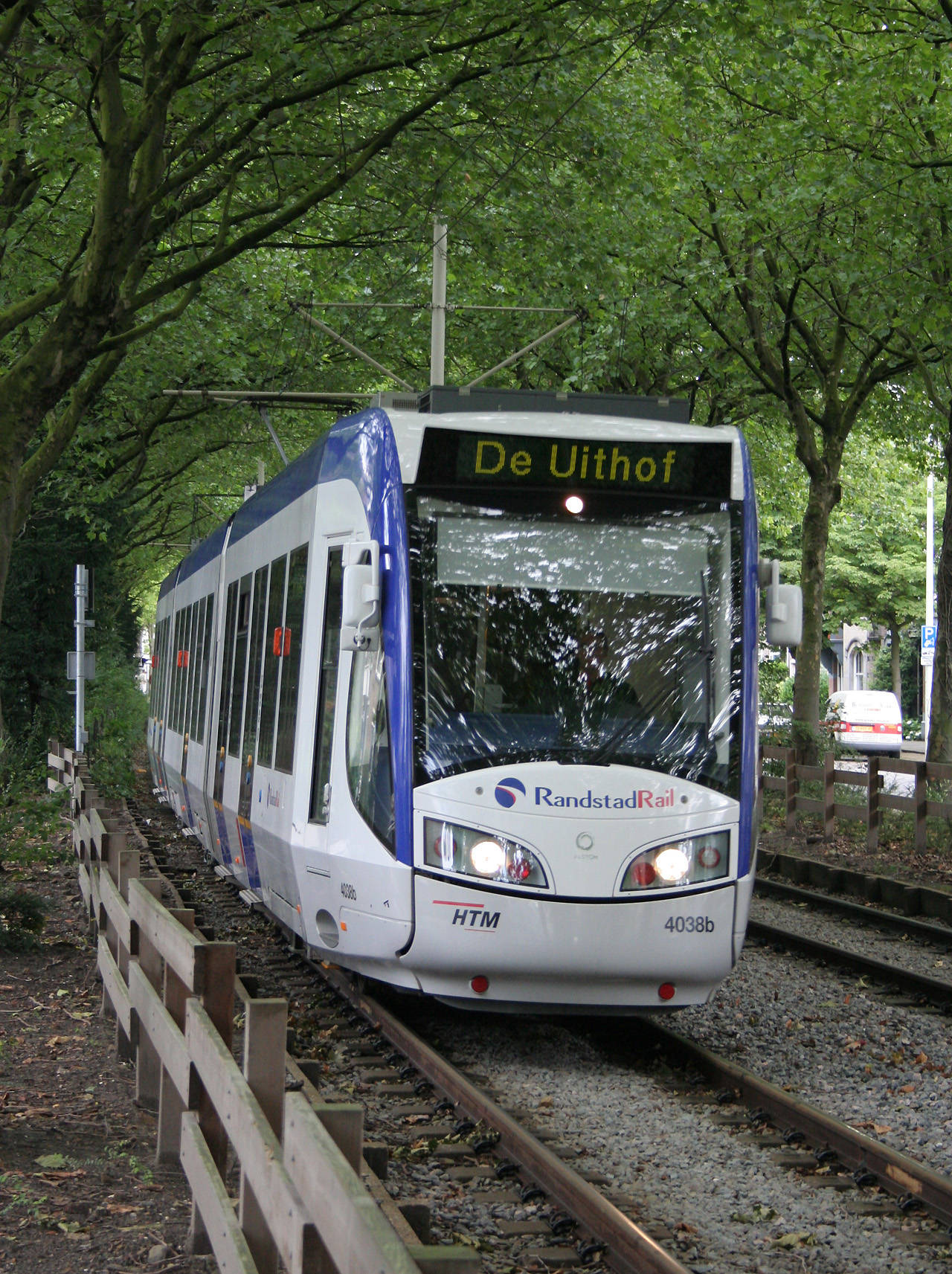
A RegioCitadis on RR4
