= Leyenburg RandstadRail station =

Leyenburg
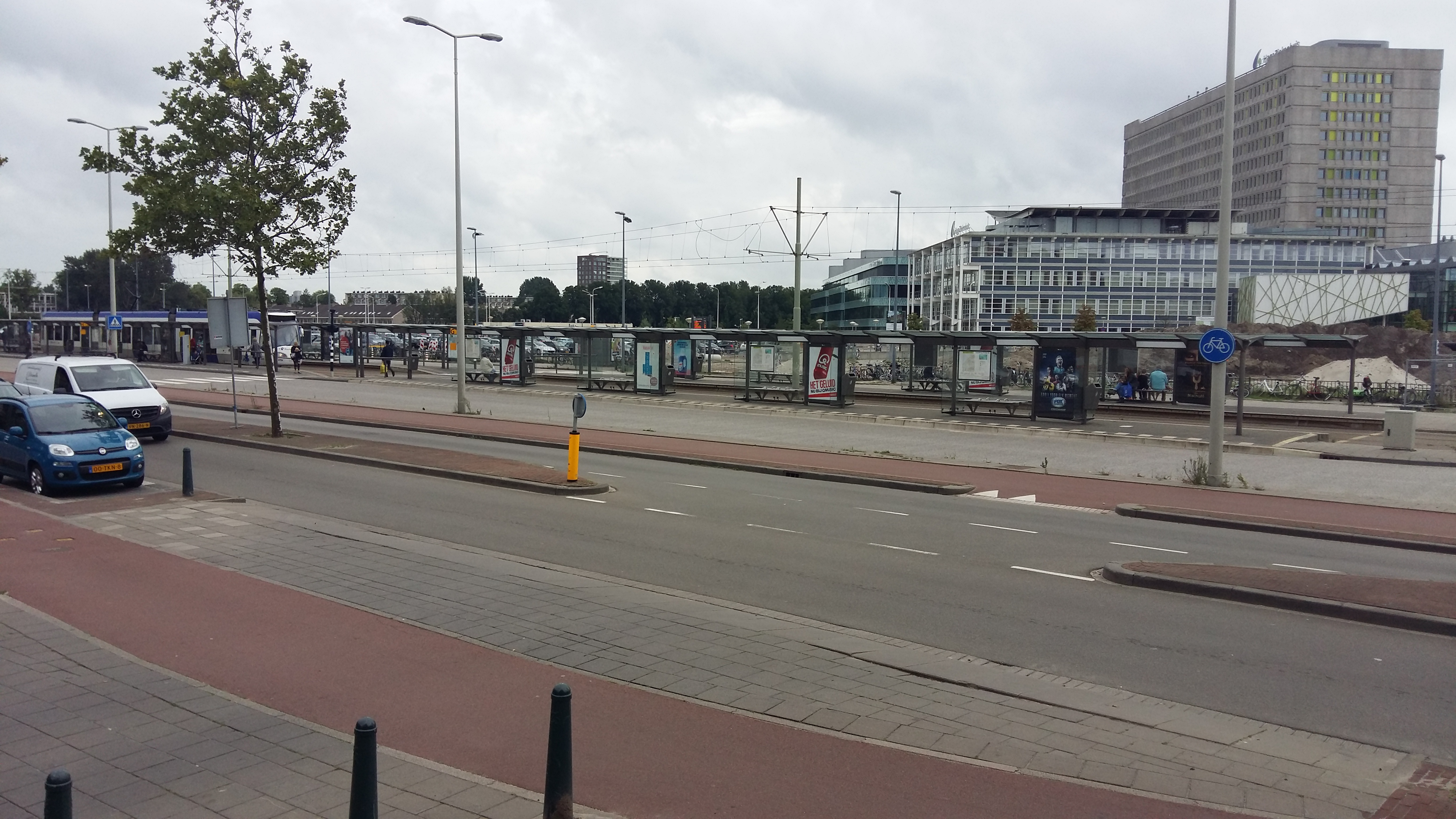

General information
- Location: Netherlands
- Coordinates: 52°03′43″N 4°16′14″E

Services
Preceding station	RandstadRail	Following station
Monnickendamplein towards Lansingerland-Zoetermeer	Line 4 (HTM)	Zuidwoldepad towards De Uithof
Location
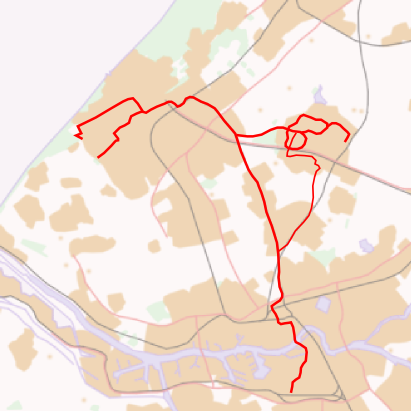
- Location within RandstadRail network

Leyenburg is a RandstadRail station in The Hague, Netherlands. It is a stop for RandstadRail line 4, tram line 6, and bus lines 21, 23, 26, 27, 31, 34, 35, 36, 37 and 86, and is located on the Leyweg. Leyenburg serves as an important interchange between bus and tram services.

== RandstadRail services ==
The following services currently call at Leyenburg:

Service	Route	Material	Frequency
RR4	De Uithof - Beresteinaan - Bouwlustlaan - De Rade - Dedemsvaart - Zuidwoldepad- Leyenburg - Monnickendamplein - Tienhovenselaan - Dierenselaan - De La Reyweg - Monstersestraat - MCH Westeinde - Brouwersgracht - Grote Markt - Spui - Den Haag Centraal - Beatrixkwartier - Laan van NOI - Voorburg 't Loo - Leidschendam-Voorburg - Forepark - Leidschenveen - Voorweg (Low Level) - Centrum West - Stadhuis - Palenstein - Seghwaert - Willem Dreeslaan - Oosterheem - Javalaan	HTM RegioCitadis Tram	6x per hour (Monday - Saturday, Every 10 Minutes), 5x per hour (Sundays, Every 12 Minutes), 4x per hour (Evenings, after 8pm, Every 15 Minutes)

== Tram Services ==
Service	Operator	Route
6	HTM	MCH Antoniushove - Leidsenhage - Essesteijn - Station Mariahoeve - Aegonplein - Margarethaland - Hofzichtlaan - Vlamenburg - Reigersbergenweg - Carel Reinierszkade - Stuyvesantplein - Oostinje - Ternoot - Centraal Station - Spui - Grote Markt - Brouwersgracht - Om en Bij - Vaillantlaan - Hobbemaplein - Delftselaan - Paul Krugerplein - Nunspeetlaan - Tienhovenselaan - Monnickendamplein - Leyenburg

== Bus service ==
Service	Operator	Route
21	HTM	Vrederust - Leyenburg - Scheveningen Noorderstrand
23	HTM	Duindorp - Voorburg - Rijswijk - Leyenburg - Kijkduin
26	HTM	Kijkduin - Loosduinen - Oude Haagweg - Leyenburg - Monnickendamplein - Escamplaan - De La Reyweg - Station Moerwijk - Station Hollands Spoor - Voorburg - Station Voorburg
27	HTM	Leyenburg - Morgenstond - Wateringen - Wateringse Veld
31	Veolia Transport	Leyenburg - Loosduinen - Monster - 's-Gravenzande - Naaldwijk
34	Veolia Transport	Leyenburg - Poeldijk - Honselersdijk - Naaldwijk - Monster - Ter Heijde
35	Veolia Transport	Leyenburg - Monster - 's-Gravenzande - Hook of Holland
36 (Peak Hours only)	Veolia Transport	Leyenburg - Maassluis - Maasland
37	Veolia Transport	Leyenburg - Wateringse Veld - Station Delft
86	Veoia Transport	Leyenburg - Naaldwijk - Maasland - Station Schiedam Centrum( - Rotterdam Centraal)

== Gallery ==
RandstadRail network map.

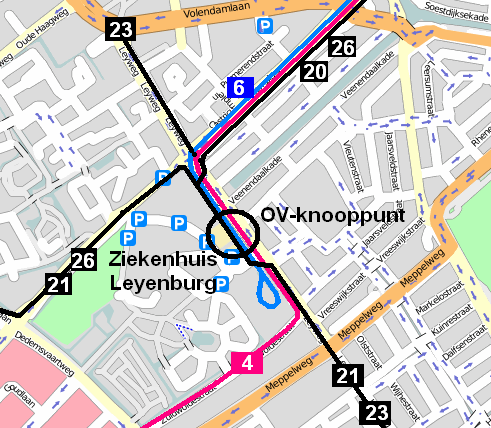
A RegioCitadis on RR4.

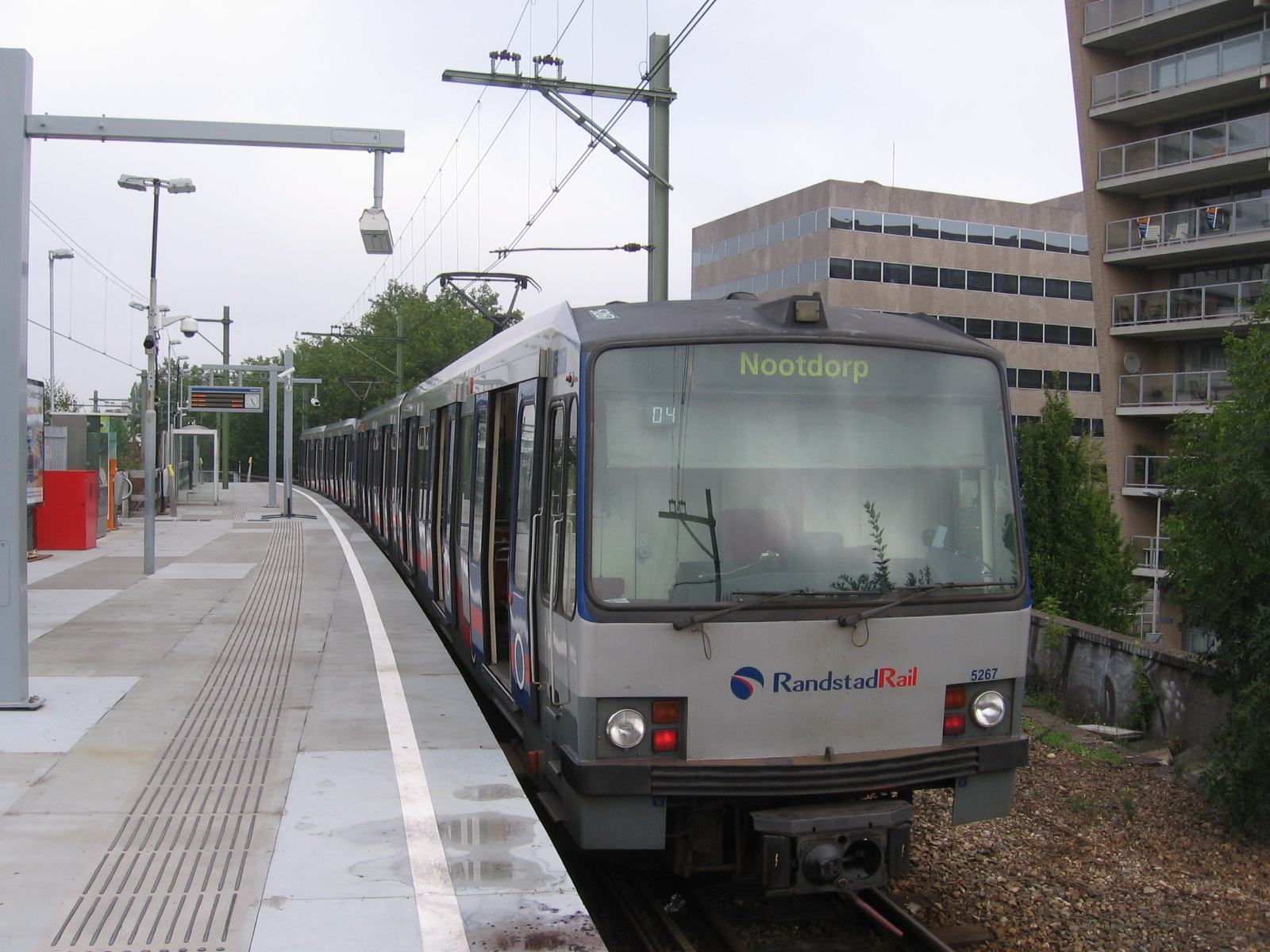
An RET Metro set that was converted for RandstadRail operation.

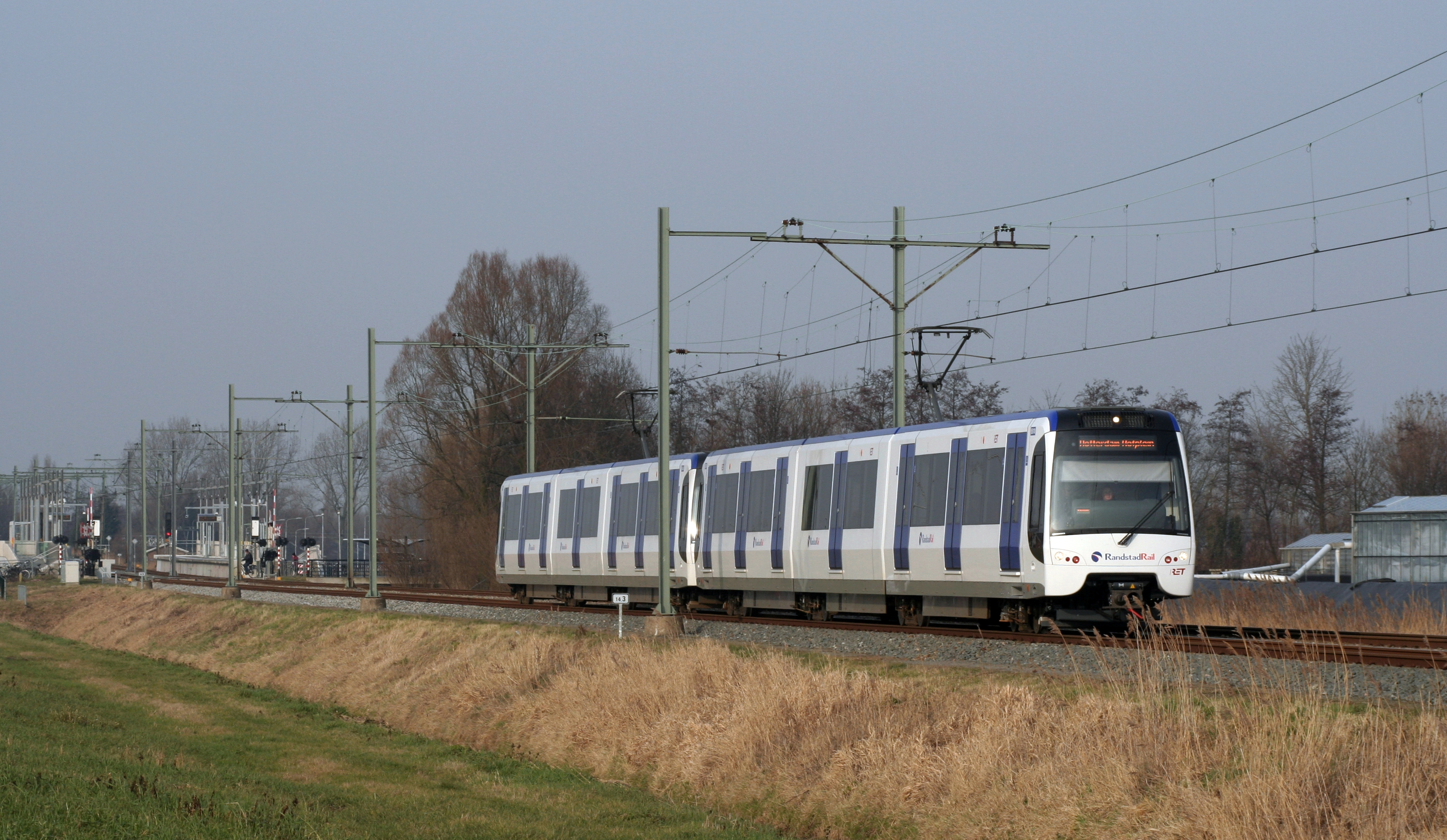
A new RET RandstadRail set, which replaced the Metro sets.
