= Willem Dreeslaan RandstadRail station =

Railway station in Zoetermeer, Netherlands

Willem Dreeslaan
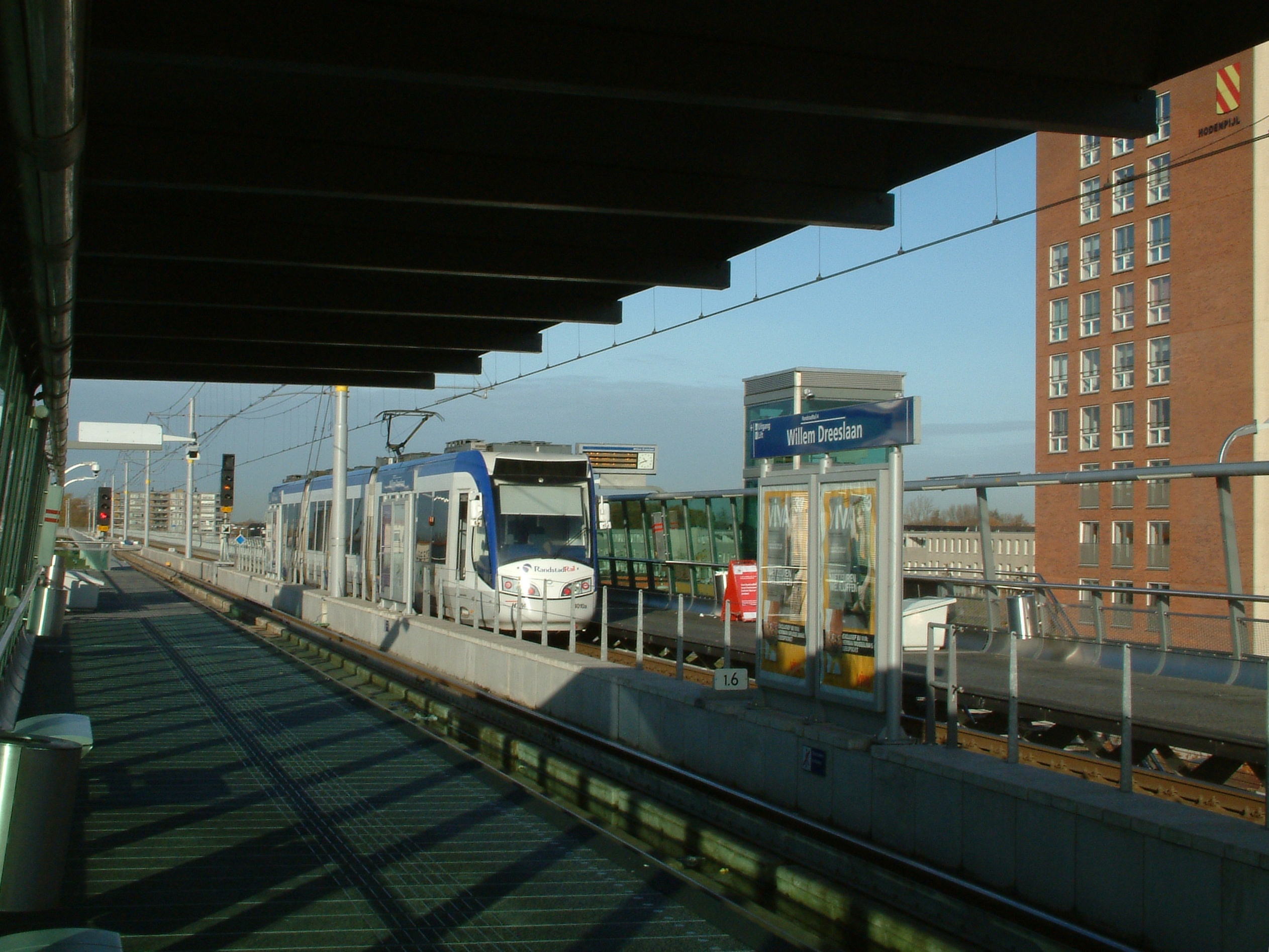

General information
- Location: Netherlands
- Coordinates: 52°03′55″N 4°32′07″E
- Platforms: 2

History
- Opened: 29 October 2006; 19 years ago

Services
Preceding station	RandstadRail	Following station
Oosterheem towards Lansingerland-Zoetermeer	Line 4 (HTM)	Seghwaert towards De Uithof
Location
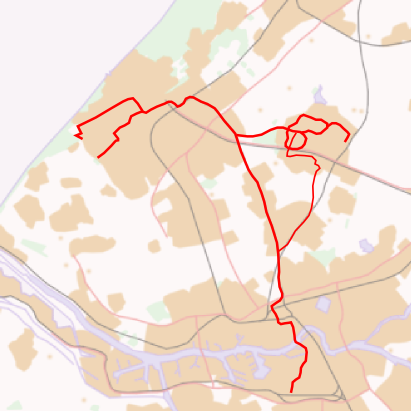
- Location within RandstadRail network

Willem Dreeslaan is a RandstadRail station in Zoetermeer, the Netherlands.

== History ==
The station opened on 29 October 2006, as part of the Oosterheemlijn (Seghwaert - Javalaan). The station is on a viaduct along the Aletta Jacobslaan at the junction with Willem Dreeslaan.

== Train services ==
The following services currently call at Willem Dreeslaan:

Service	Route	Material	Frequency
RR4	De Uithof - Beresteinaan - Bouwlustlaan - De Rade - Dedemsvaart - Zuidwoldepad - Leyenburg - Monnickendamplein - Tienhovenselaan - Dierenselaan - De La Reyweg - Monstersestraat - MCH Westeinde - Brouwersgracht - Grote Markt - Spui - Den Haag Centraal - Beatrixkwartier - Laan van NOI - Voorburg 't Loo - Leidschendam-Voorburg - Forepark - Leidschenveen - Voorweg (Low Level) - Centrum West - Stadhuis - Palenstein - Seghwaert - Willem Dreeslaan - Oosterheem - Javalaan	HTM RegioCitadis Tram	6x per hour (Monday - Saturday, Every 10 Minutes), 5x per hour (Sundays, Every 12 Minutes), 4x per hour (Evenings, after 8pm, Every 15 Minutes)

== Bus services ==
- 165 (Centrum West RR - Palenstein RR - Willem Dreeslaan RR - Benthuizen - Hazerwoude - Hazerwoude Rijndijk - Alphen a/d Rijn NS) - Arriva
- 565 (Centrum West RR - Palenstein RR - Willem Dreeslaan RR - Benthuizen - Hazerwoude - Hazerwoude Rijndijk - Alphen a/d Rijn NS) - Arriva

== Gallery ==
RandstadRail Network Map

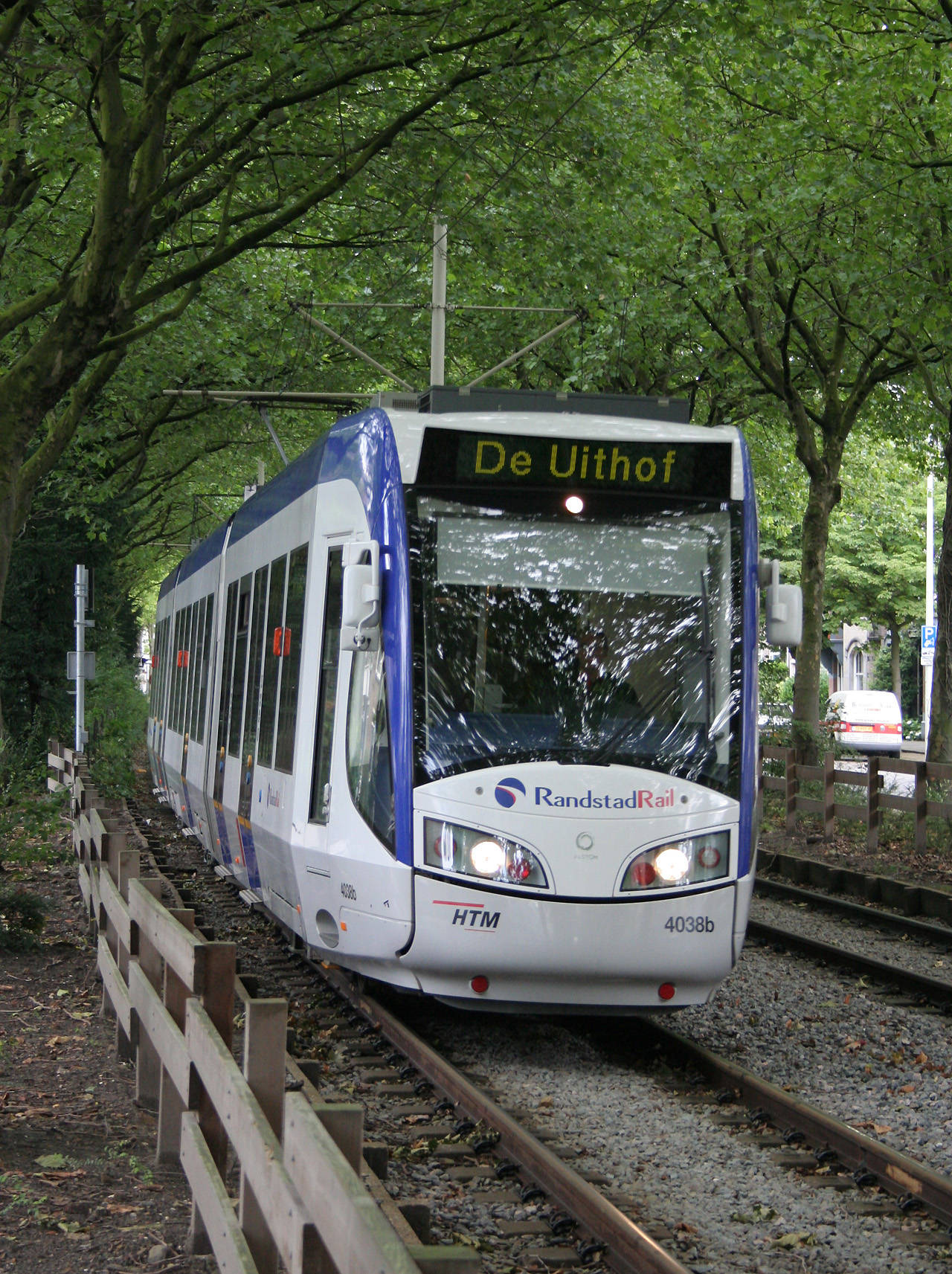
A RegioCitadis on RR4

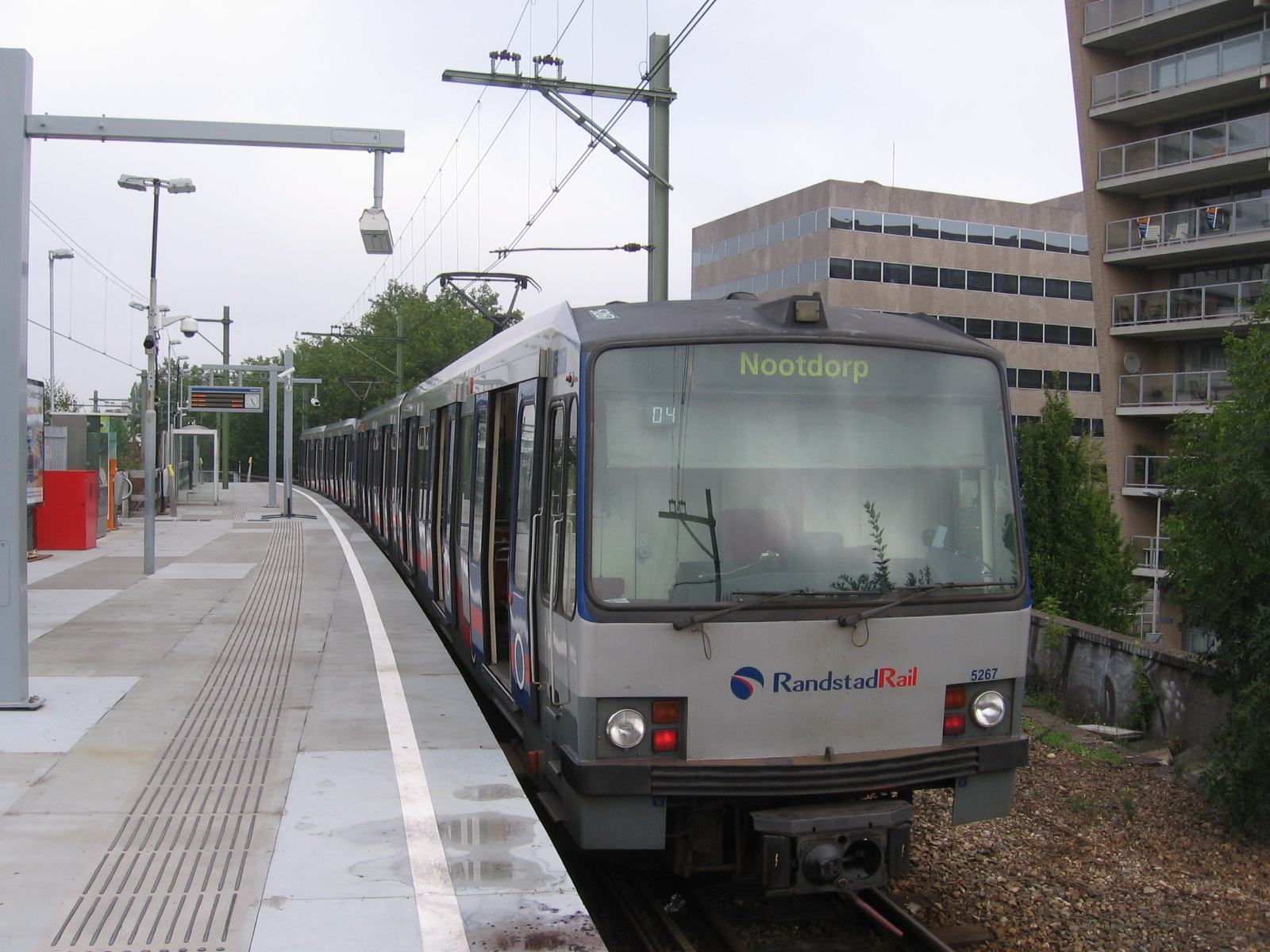
An RET Metro set that was converted for RandstadRail operation.

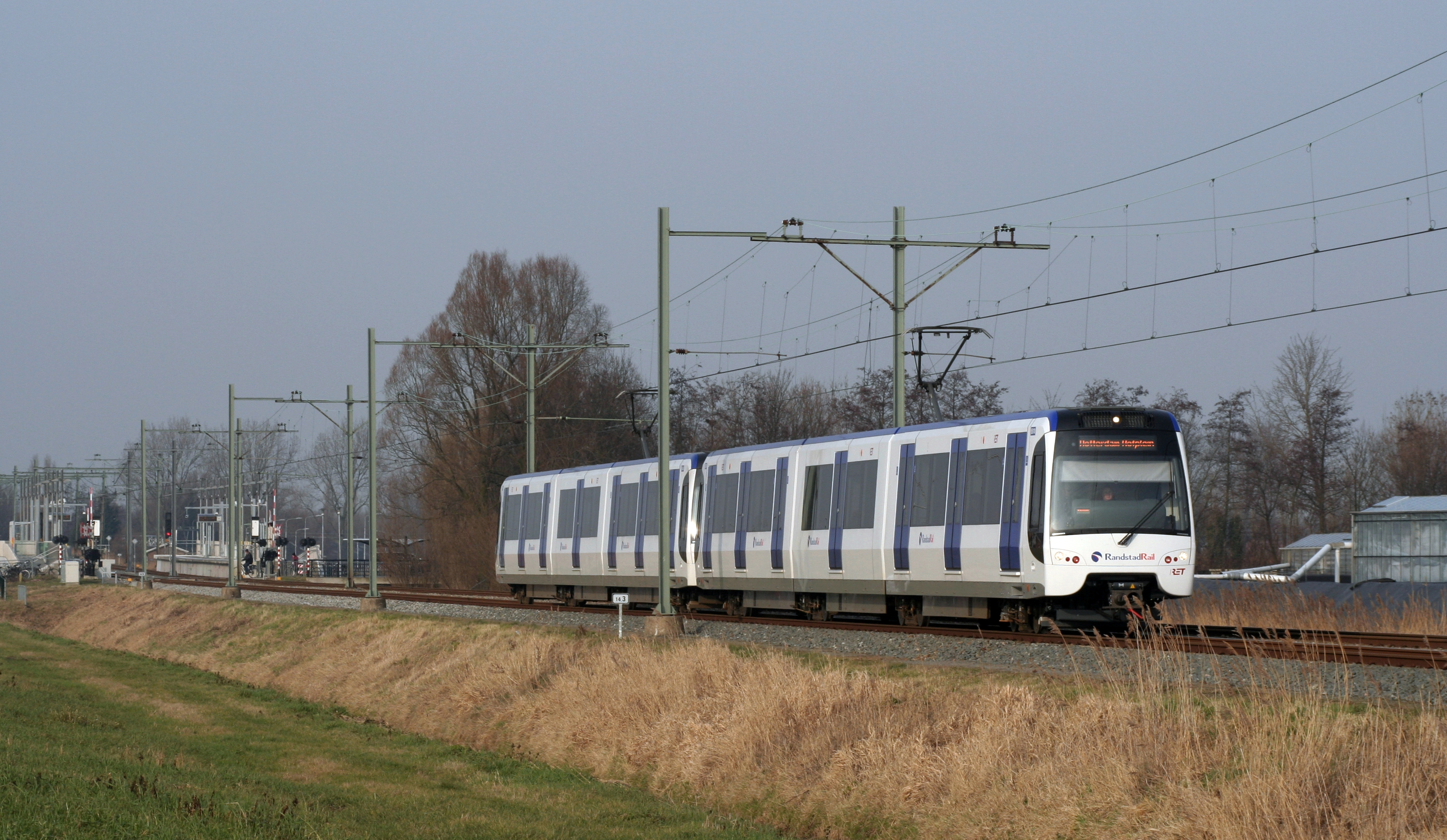
A new RET RandstadRail set, which replaced the Metro sets.

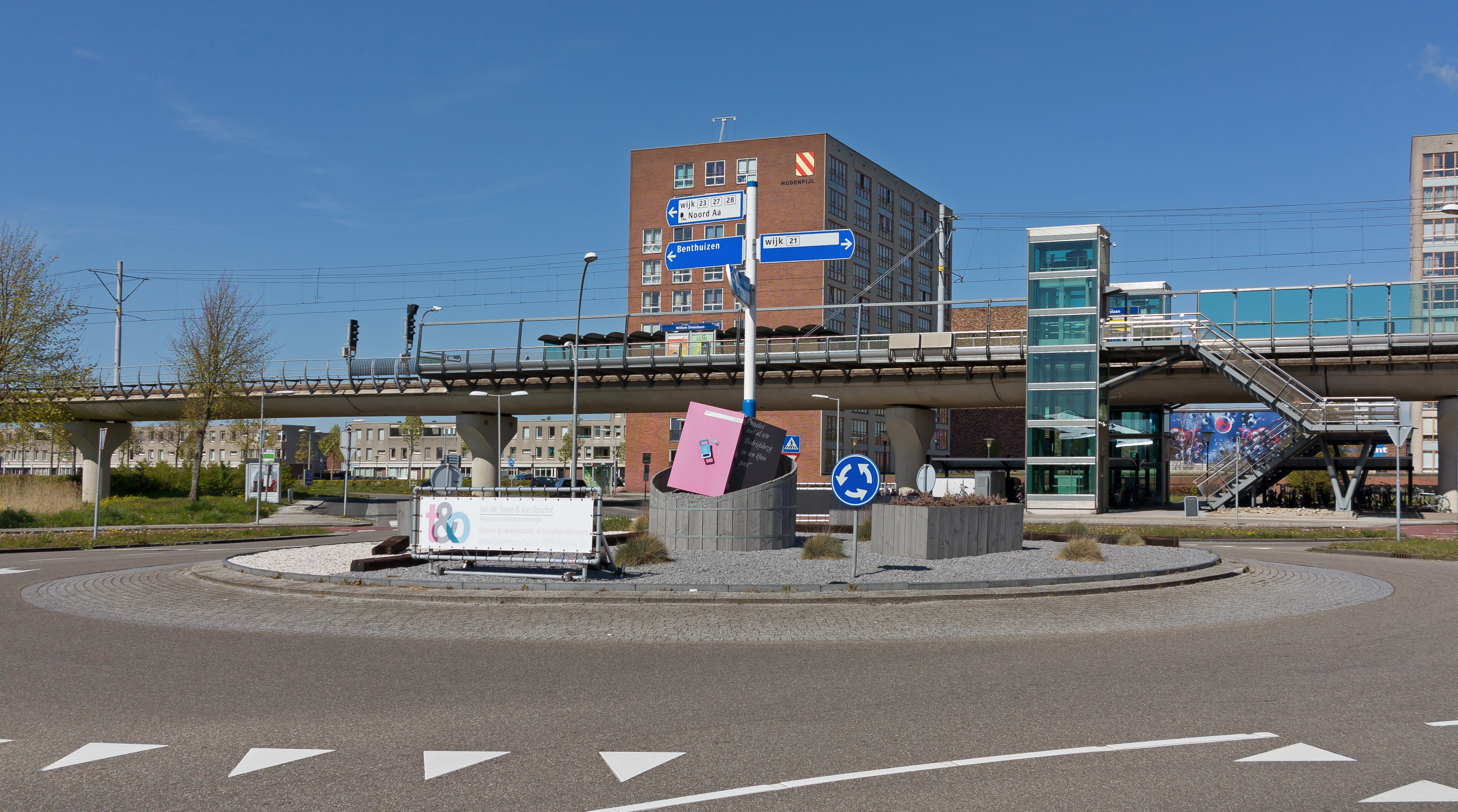
View to station Willem Dreeslaan

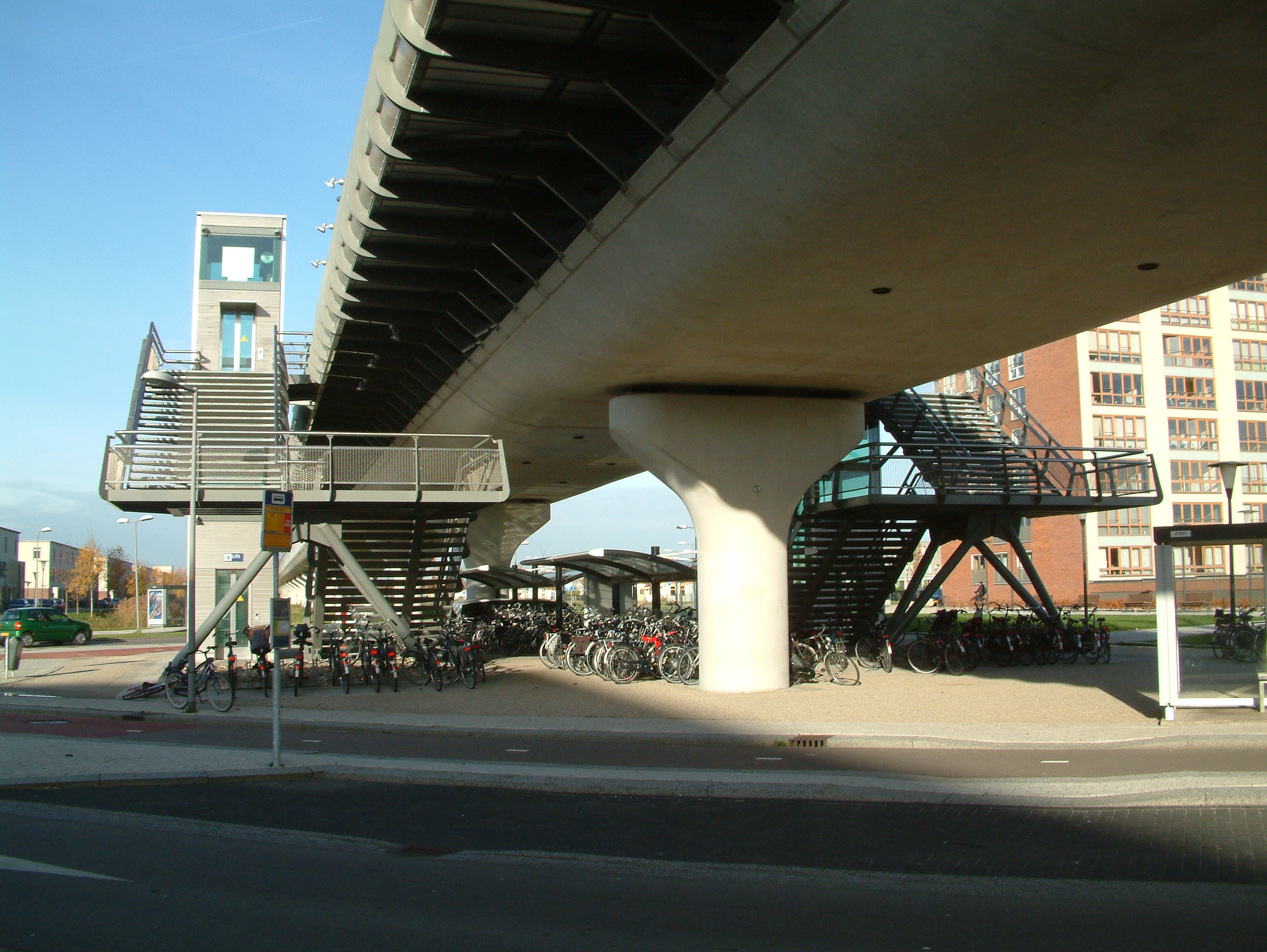
Stairs and Lift, with bus stop in foreground.

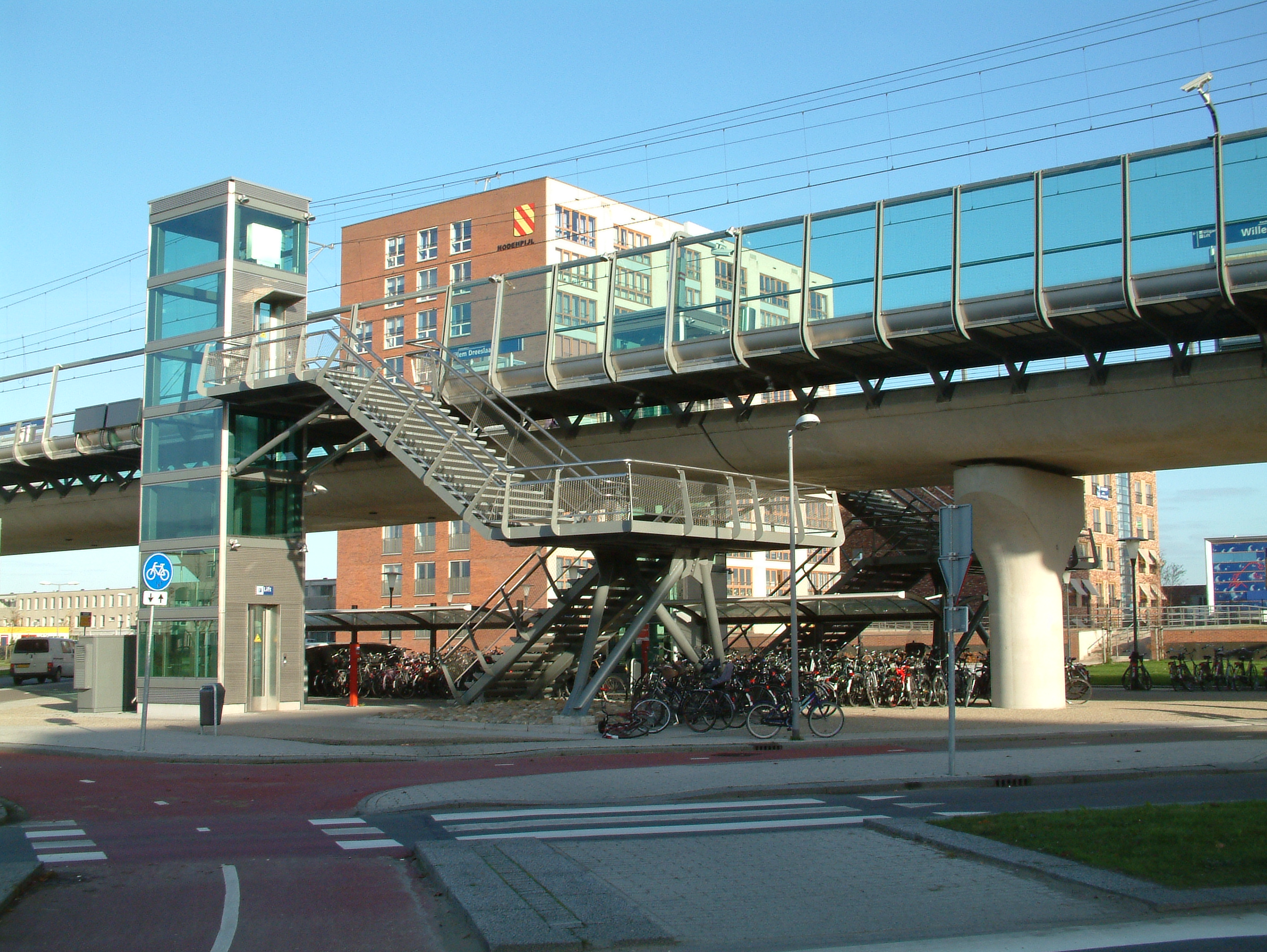
The station from street level.
