= De Uithof RandstadRail station =

De Uithof
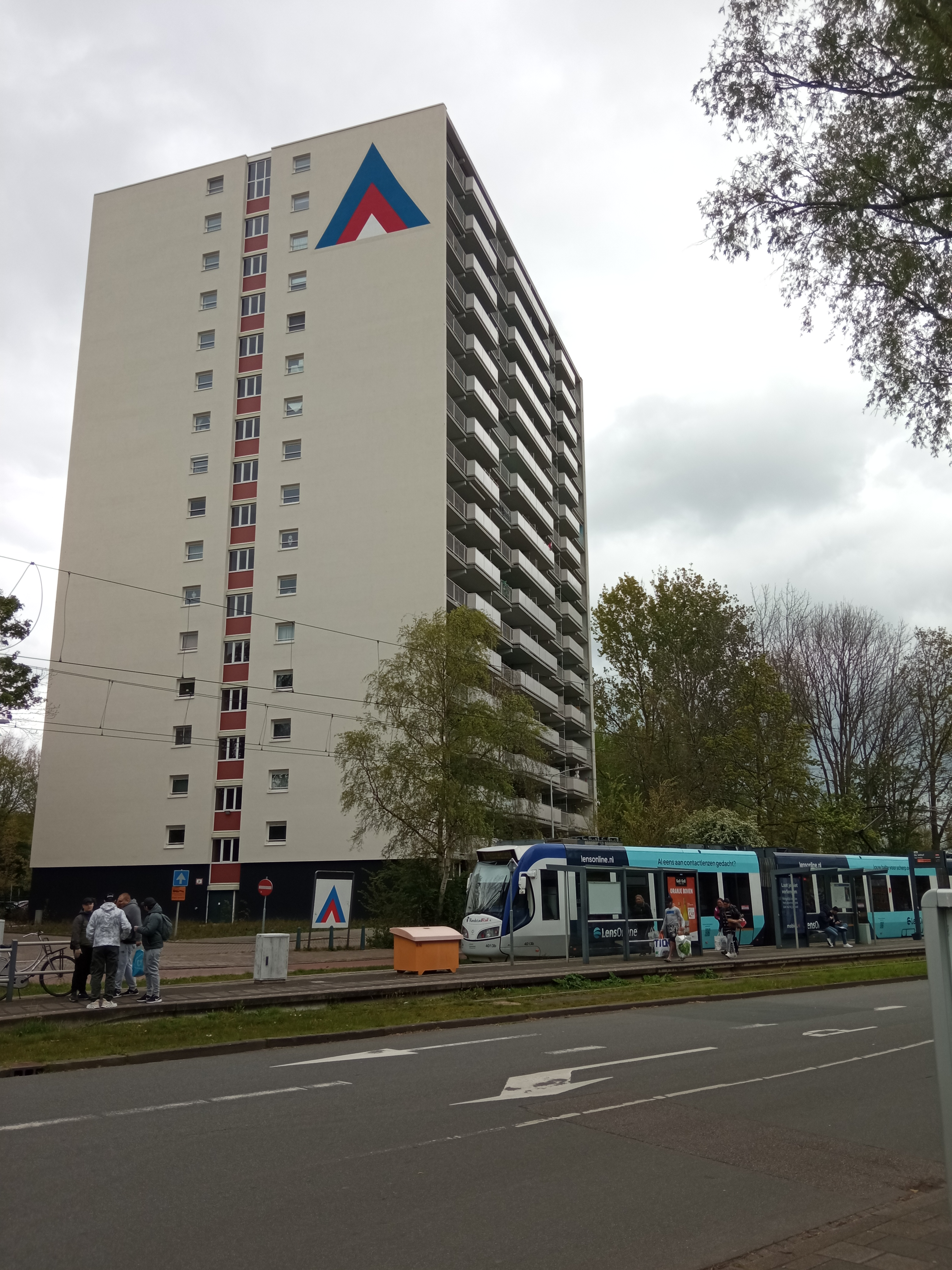

General information
- Location: Netherlands
- Coordinates: 52°02′22″N 4°14′43″E

Services
Preceding station	RandstadRail	Following station
Beresteinlaan towards Lansingerland-Zoetermeer	Line 4 (HTM)	Terminus
Location
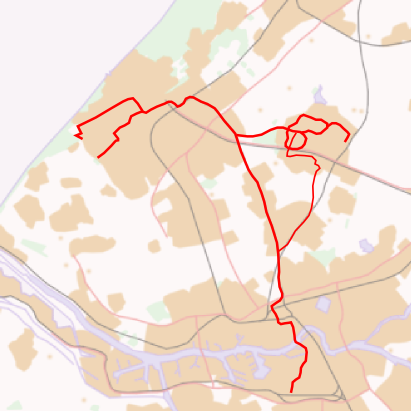
- Location within RandstadRail network

De Uithof is a RandstadRail station in The Hague, Netherlands. It is the final stop of line 4.

== RandstadRail services ==
The following services currently call at De Uithof:

Service	Route	Material	Frequency
RR4	De Uithof - Beresteinlaan - Bouwlustlaan - De Rade - Dedemsvaartweg - Zuidwoldepad - Leyenburg - Monnickendamplein - Tienhovenselaan - Dierenselaan - De La Reyweg - Monstersestraat - MCH Westeinde - Brouwersgracht - Grote Markt - Spui - Den Haag Centraal - Beatrixkwartier - Laan van NOI - Voorburg 't Loo - Leidschendam-Voorburg - Forepark - Leidschenveen - Voorweg (Low Level) - Centrum West - Stadhuis - Palenstein - Seghwaert - Willem Dreeslaan - Oosterheem - Javalaan	HTM Regio Alstom Citadis Tram	6x per hour (Monday - Saturday, Every 10 Minutes), 5x per hour (Sundays, Every 12 Minutes), 4x per hour (Evenings, after 8pm, Every 15 Minutes)

== Gallery ==
RandstadRail Network Map

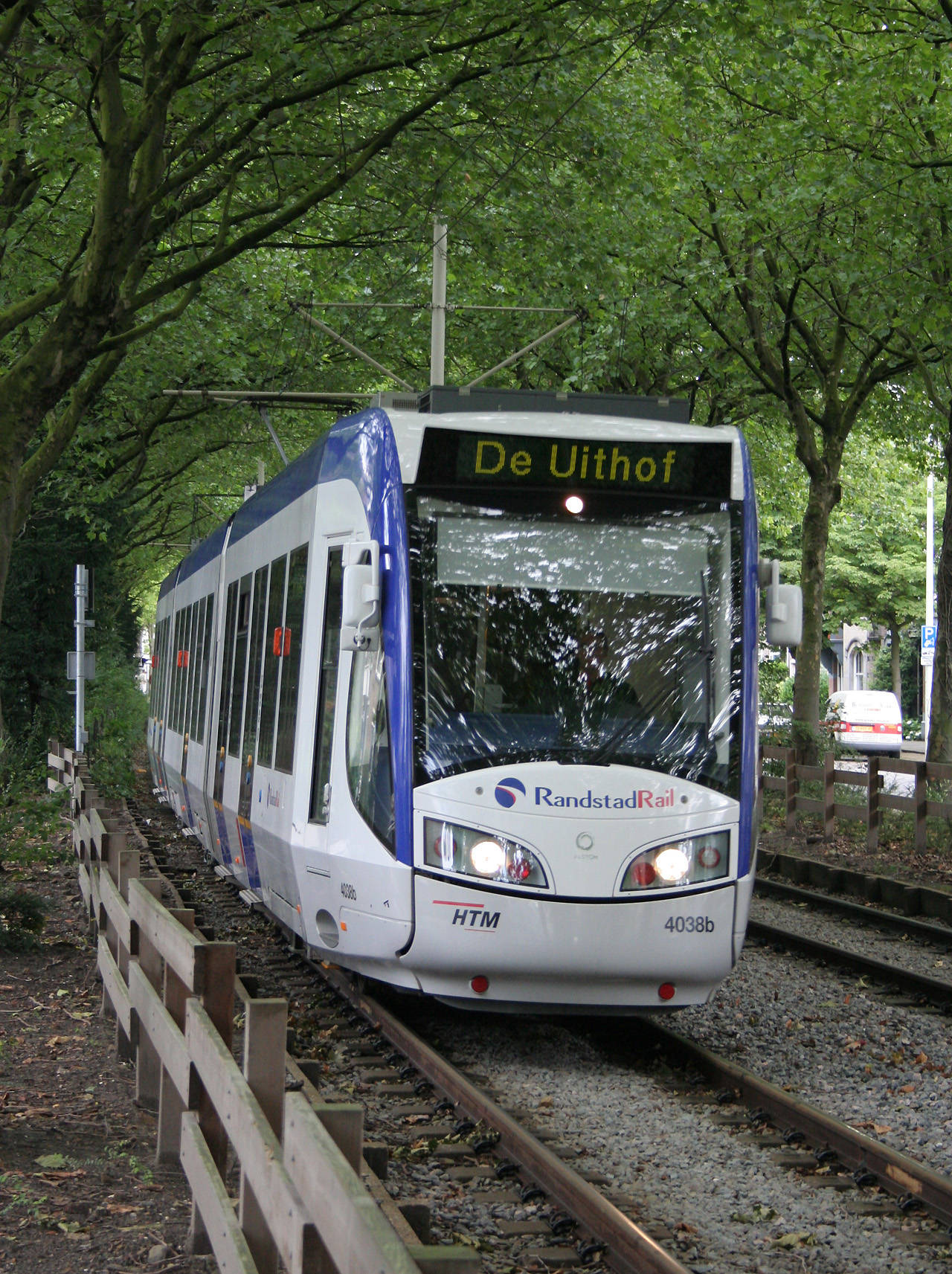
A Regio Alstom Citadis on RR4

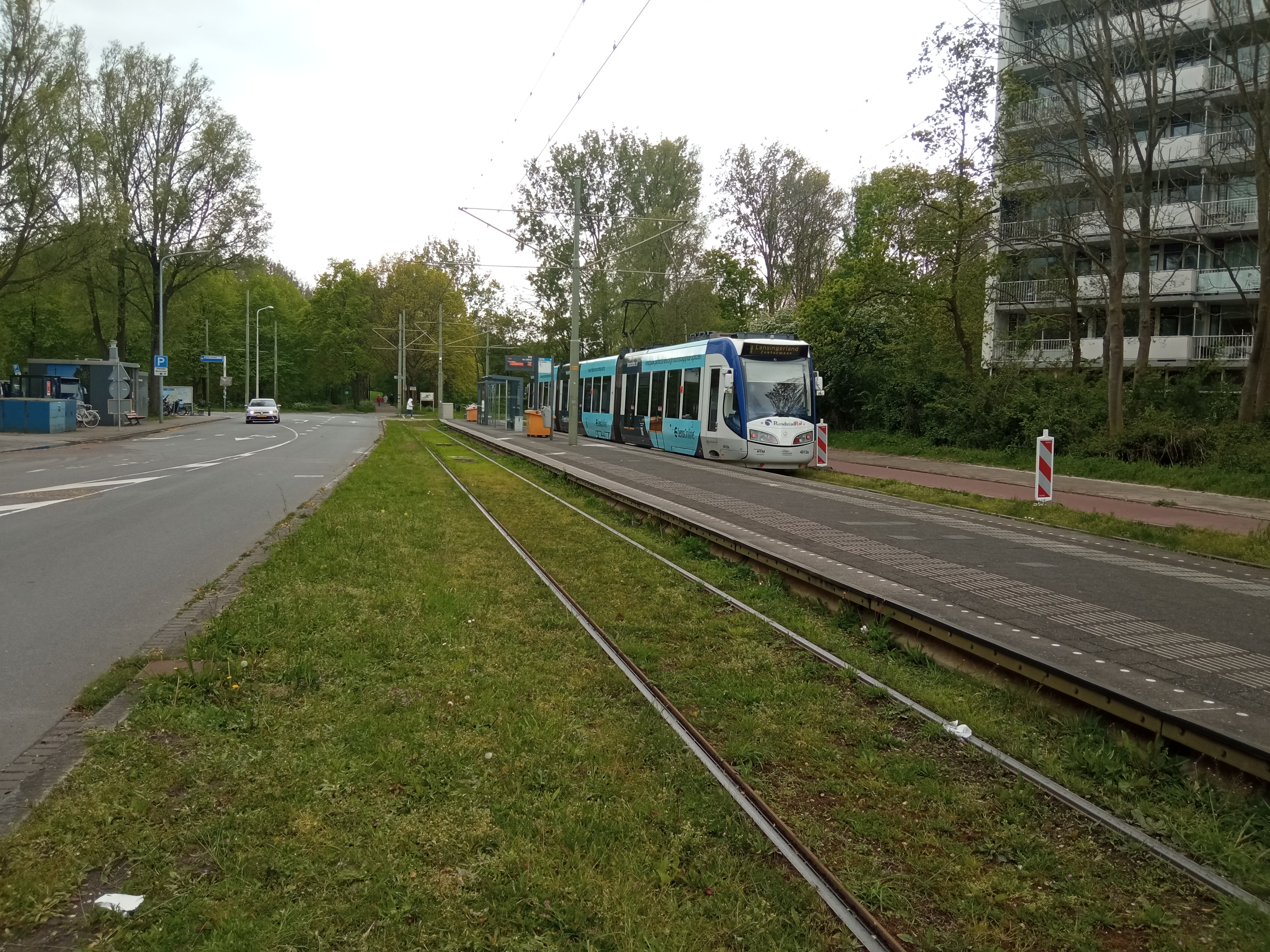
De Uithof RandstadRail station.

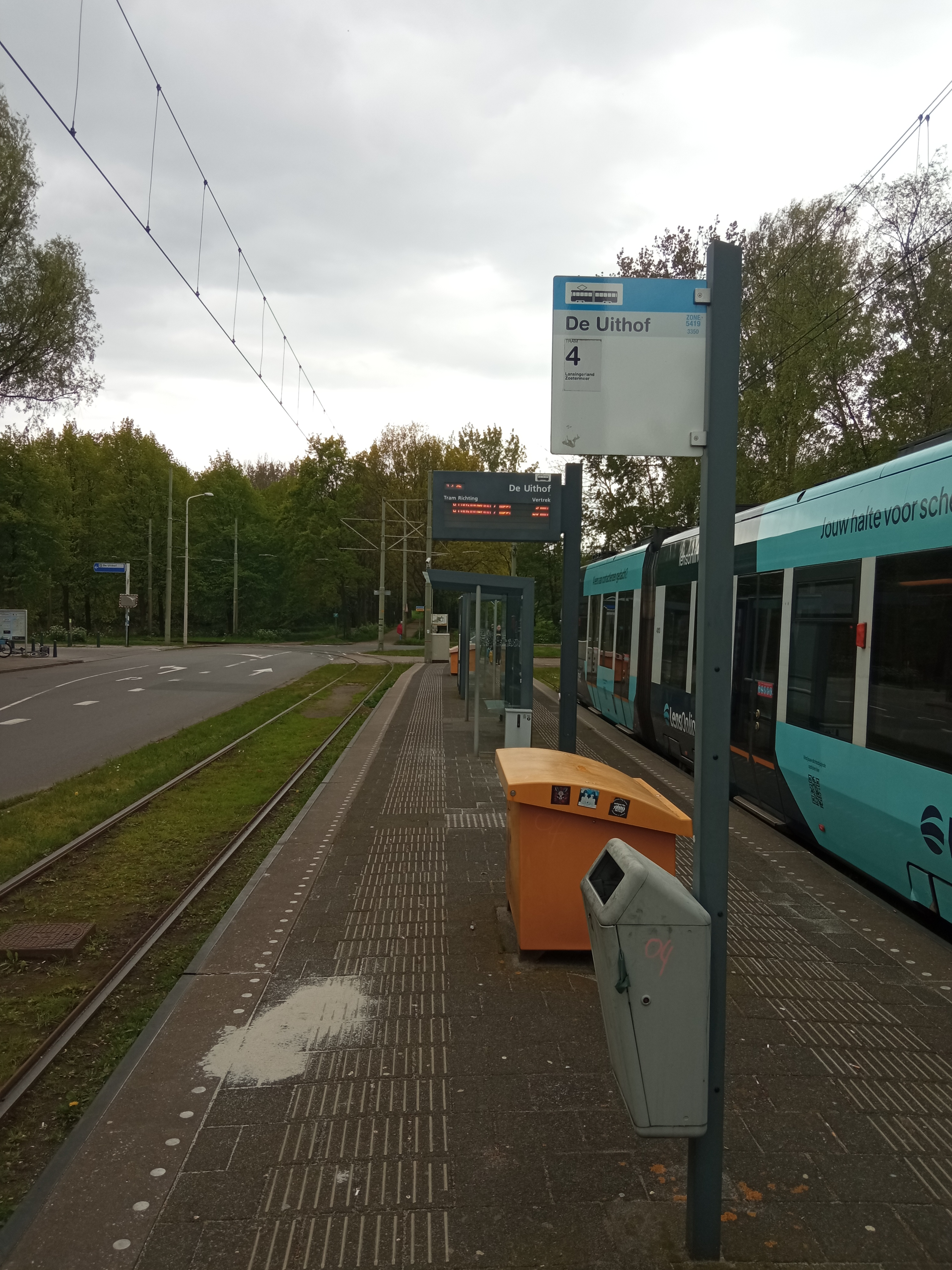
De Uithof RandstadRail station
