= HMC Westeinde RandstadRail station =

RandstadRail stop in The Hague, Netherlands

HMC Westeinde

General information
- Location: Netherlands
- Coordinates: 52°04′22″N 4°17′58″E

Services
Preceding station	RandstadRail	Following station
Brouwersgracht towards Centrum-West	Line 3 (HTM)	Elandstraat towards Arnold Spoelplein
Brouwersgracht towards Lansingerland-Zoetermeer	Line 4 (HTM)	Monstersestraat towards De Uithof
Location
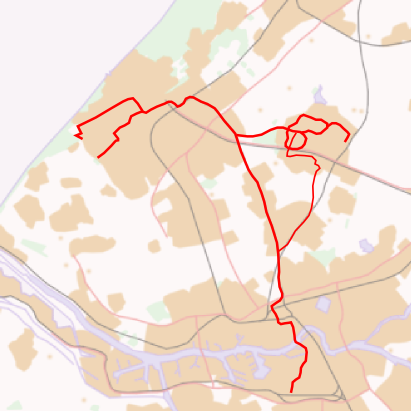
- Location within RandstadRail network

HMC Westeinde is a RandstadRail stop in The Hague, Netherlands.

== History ==
The station is a stop for lines 2, 3 and 4 and is on the Lijnbaan. Passengers for the Westeinde hospital should alight here. Passengers should change between RandstadRail lines if necessary here, as it is the last/first stop they operate together.

== RandstadRail services ==
The following services currently call at HMC Westeinde:

Service	Route	Material	Frequency
RR3	Arnold Spoelplein - Pisuissestraat - Mozartlaan - Heliotrooplaan - Muurbloemweg - Hoefbladlaan - De Savornin Lohmanplein - Appelstraat - Zonnebloemstraat - Azaleaplein - Goudenregenstraat - Fahrenheitstraat - Valkenbosplein - Conradkade - Van Speijkstraat - Elandstraat - HMC Westeinde - Brouwersgracht - Grote Markt - Spui - Den Haag Centraal - Beatrixkwartier - Laan van NOI - Voorburg 't Loo - Leidschendam-Voorburg - Forepark - Leidschenveen - Voorweg (Low Level) - Centrum-West - Stadhuis - Palenstein - Seghwaert - Leidsewallen - De Leyens - Buytenwegh - Voorweg (High Level) - Meerzicht - Driemanspolder - Delftsewallen - Dorp - Centrum-West	HTM RegioCidatis Tram	6x per hour (Monday - Saturday, Every 10 Minutes), 4x per hour (Sundays and evenings, after 7pm, Every 15 Minutes), 12x per hour (Workdays and sunday, rush hours, Every 5 minutes to De Savornin Lohmanplein/The Hague Central Station)
RR4	De Uithof - Beresteinaan - Bouwlustlaan - De Rade - Dedemsvaart - Zuidwoldepad- Leyenburg - Monnickendamplein - Tienhovenselaan - Dierenselaan - De la Reyweg - Monstersestraat - HMC Westeinde - Brouwersgracht - Grote Markt - Spui - Den Haag Centraal - Beatrixkwartier - Laan van NOI - Voorburg 't Loo - Leidschendam-Voorburg - Forepark - Leidschenveen - Voorweg (Low Level) - Centrum West - Stadhuis - Palenstein - Seghwaert - Willem Dreeslaan - Oosterheem - Javalaan - Van Tuyllpark - Lansingerland-Zoetermeer	HTM RegioCitadis Tram	6x per hour (Monday - Saturday, Every 10 Minutes), 4x per hour (Sundays and evenings, after 7pm, Every 15 Minutes), 12x per hour (Workdays, rush hours, Every 5 minutes to Monstersestraat/Zoetermeer)

== Tram Services ==
Service	Operator	Route
2	HTM	Kraayensteinlaan - Kapelaan Meereboerweg - Loosduinse Hoofdstraat - Burgemeester Hovylaan - Buitentuinen - Walnootstraat - Thorbeckelaan - Nieuwendamlaan - Laan van Eik en Duinen - Kamperfoeliestraat - Valkenboslaan - Fahrenheitstraat - De la Reyweg - Monstersestraat - HMC Westeinde - Brouwersgracht - Grote Markt - Spui - Centraal Station - Ternoot - Oostinje - Stuyvesantstraat - Station Laan van NOI - Bruijnings Ingenhoeslaan - Mgr. van Steelaan - Prinses Beatrixlaan - Voorburg 't Loo - Elzendreef - Essesteijn - Leidsenhage - HMC Antoniushove

== Gallery ==
RandstadRail Network Map

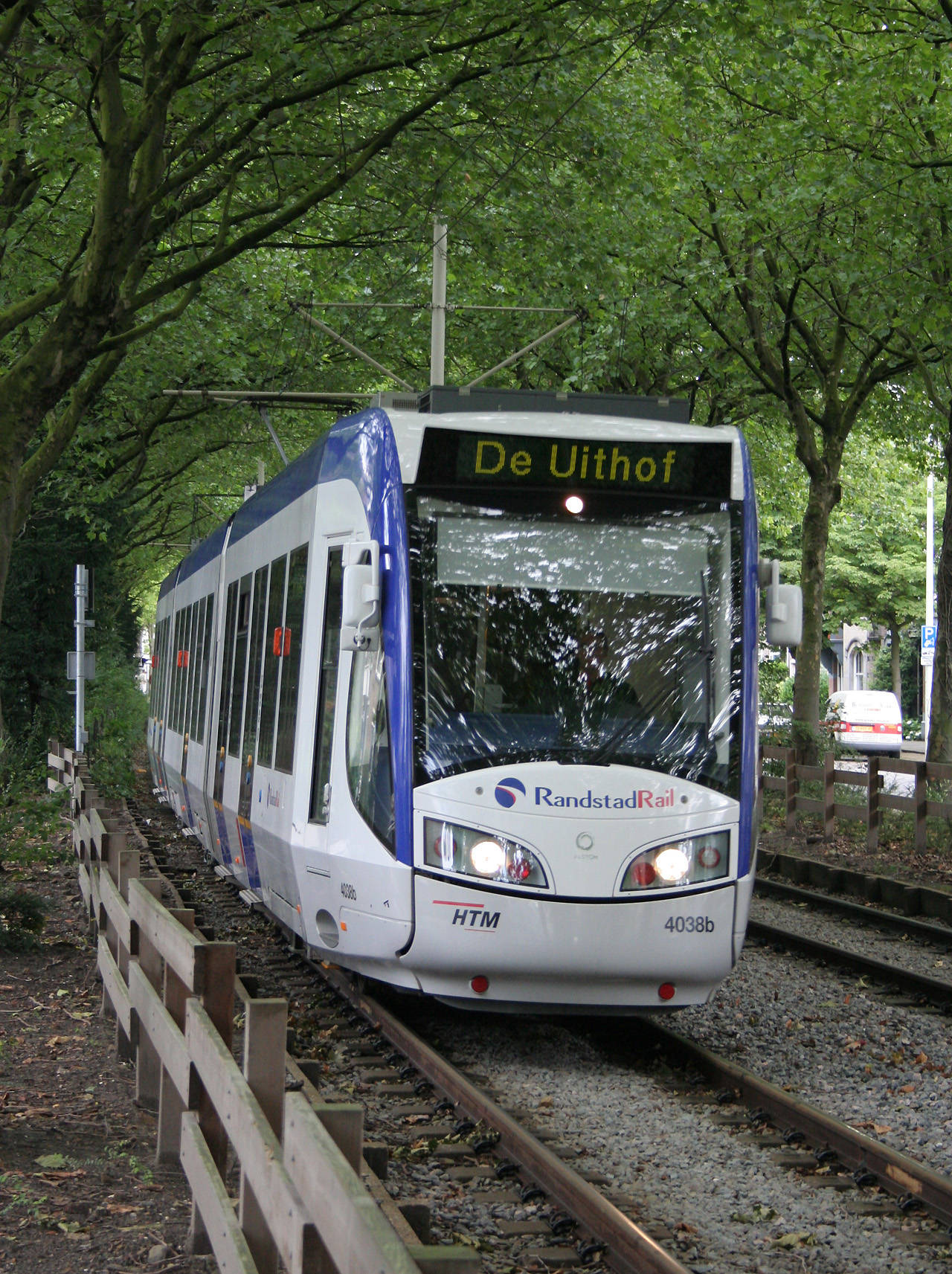
A RegioCitadis on RR4

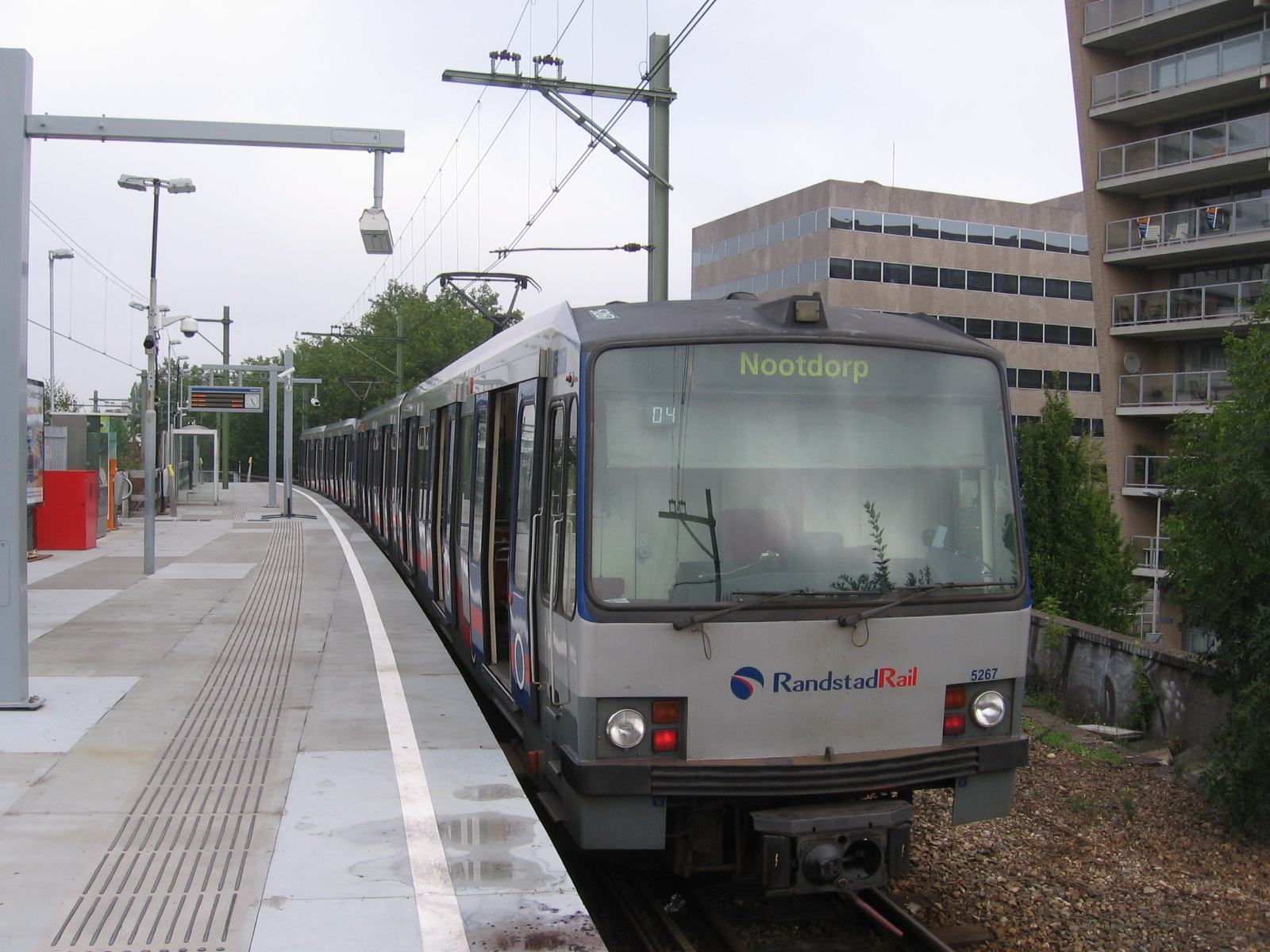
An RET Metro set that was converted for RandstadRail operation.

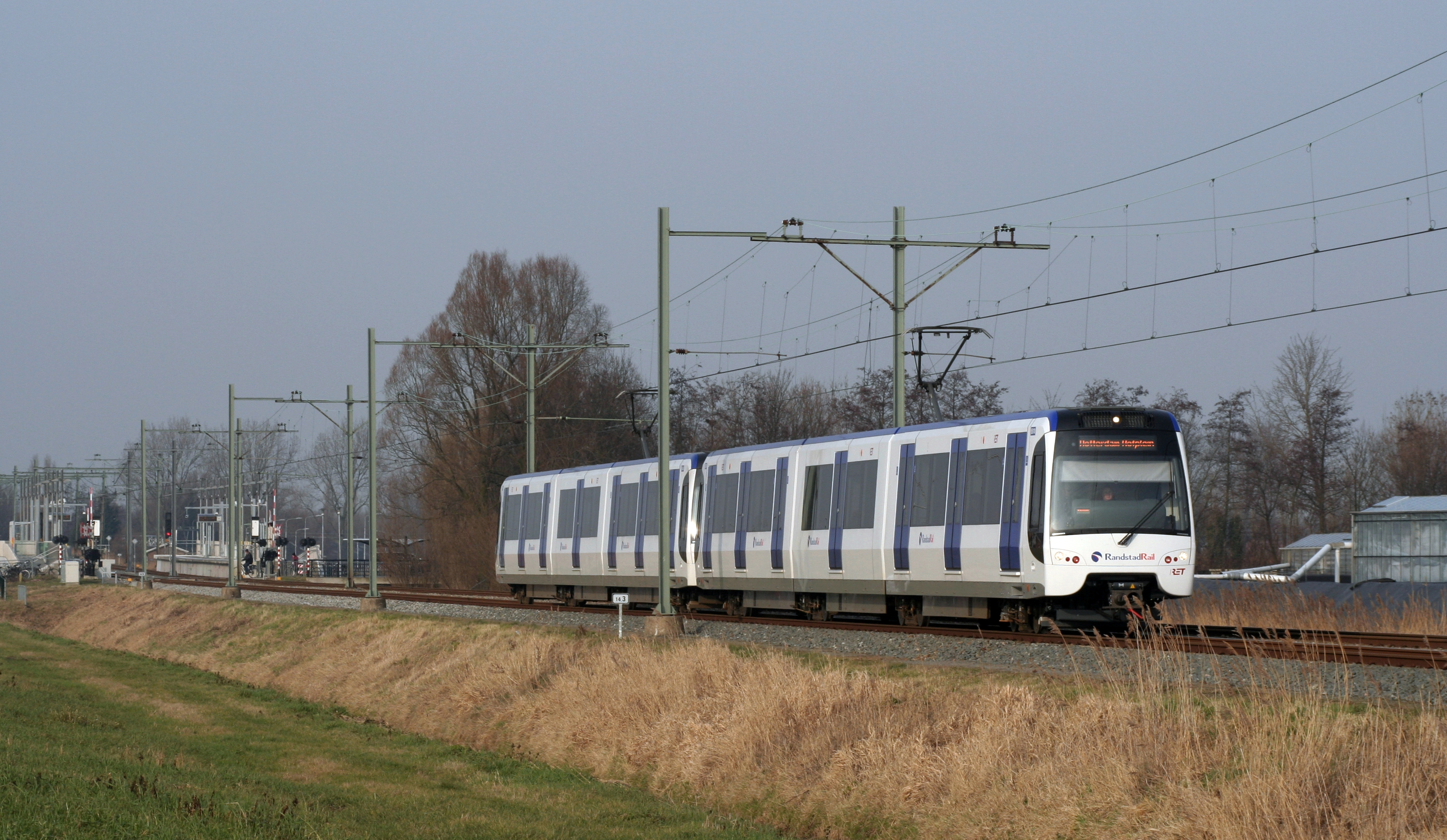
A new RET RandstadRail set, which replaced the Metro sets.
