= Beatrixkwartier RandstadRail station =

RandstadRail station in The Hague

Beatrixkwartier
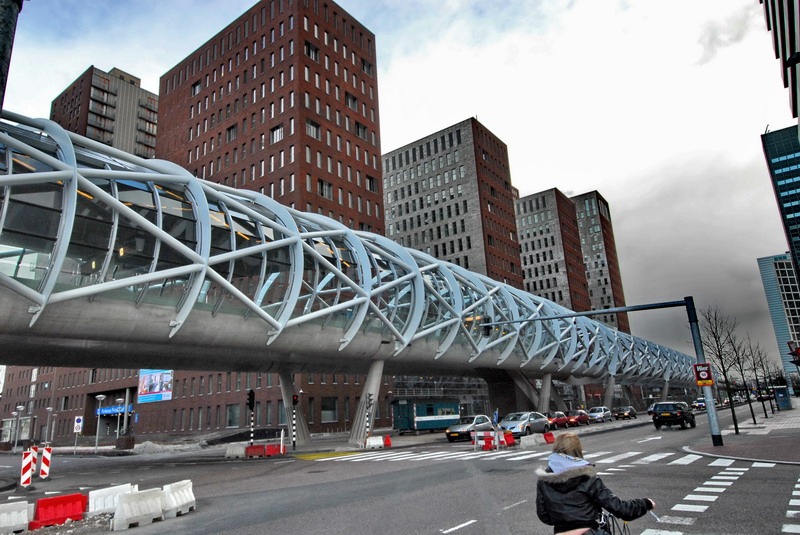
- Beatrixkwartier RandstadRail station

General information
- Location: Netherlands
- Coordinates: 52°04′48″N 4°20′5″E
- Platforms: 2

History
- Opened: 29 October 2006; 19 years ago

Services
Preceding station	RandstadRail	Following station
Den Haag Laan van NOI towards Centrum-West	Line 3 (HTM)	Den Haag Centraal towards Arnold Spoelplein
Den Haag Laan van NOI towards Lansingerland-Zoetermeer	Line 4 (HTM)	Den Haag Centraal towards De Uithof
Location
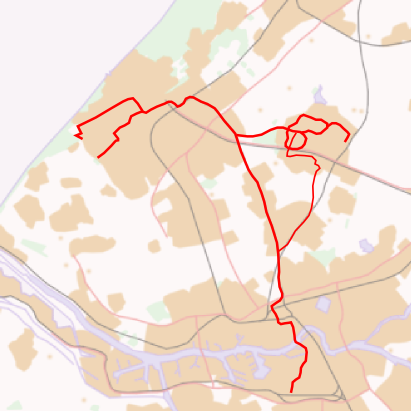
- Location within RandstadRail network

Beatrixkwartier is a RandstadRail station in the Beatrixkwartier district in The Hague, Netherlands.

== History ==
The station opened on 29 October 2006 for RandstadRail line 4, and on 20 October 2007 for RandstadRail line 3.

== RandstadRail services ==
The following services currently call at Beatrixkwartier:

Service	Route	Material	Frequency
RR3	Arnold Spoelplein - Pisuissestraat - Mozartlaan - Heliotrooplaan - Muurbloemweg - Hoefbladlaan - De Savornin Lohmanplein - Appelstraat - Zonnebloemstraat - Azaleaplein - Goudenregenstraat - Fahrenheitstraat - Valkenbosplein - Conradkade - Van Speijkstraat - Elandstraat - MCH Westeinde - Brouwersgracht - Grote Markt - Spui - Den Haag Centraal - Beatrixkwartier - Laan van NOI - Voorburg 't Loo - Leidschendam-Voorburg - Forepark - Leidschenveen - Voorweg (Low Level) - Centrum West - Stadhuis - Palenstein - Seghwaert - Leidsewallen - De Leyens - Buytenwegh - Voorweg (High Level) - Meerzicht - Driemanspolder - Delftsewallen - Dorp - Centrum West	HTM RegioCidatis Tram	6x per hour (Monday - Saturday, Every 10 Minutes), 5x per hour (Sundays, Every 12 Minutes), 4x per hour (Evenings, after 8pm, Every 15 Minutes)
RR4	De Uithof - Beresteinaan - Bouwlustlaan - De Rade - Dedemsvaart - Zuidwoldepad - Leyenburg - Monnickendamplein - Tienhovenselaan - Dierenselaan - De La Reyweg - Monstersestraat - MCH Westeinde - Brouwersgracht - Grote Markt - Spui - Den Haag Centraal - Beatrixkwartier - Laan van NOI - Voorburg 't Loo - Leidschendam-Voorburg - Forepark - Leidschenveen - Voorweg (Low Level) - Centrum West - Stadhuis - Palenstein - Seghwaert - Willem Dreeslaan - Oosterheem - Javalaan	HTM RegioCitadis Tram	6x per hour (Monday - Saturday, Every 10 Minutes), 5x per hour (Sundays, Every 12 Minutes), 4x per hour (Evenings, after 8pm, Every 15 Minutes)

== Gallery ==
RandstadRail Network Map

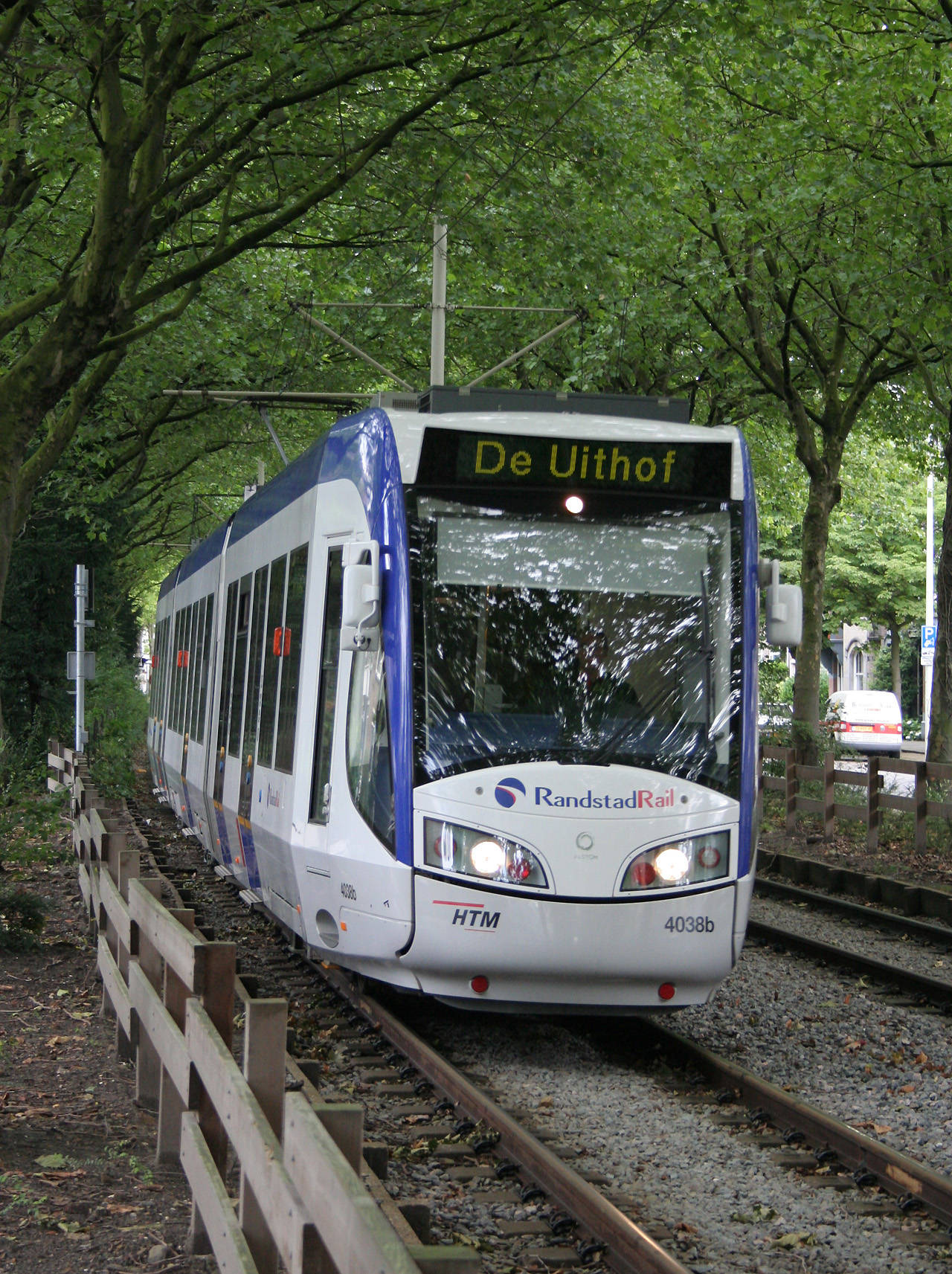
A RegioCitadis on RR4

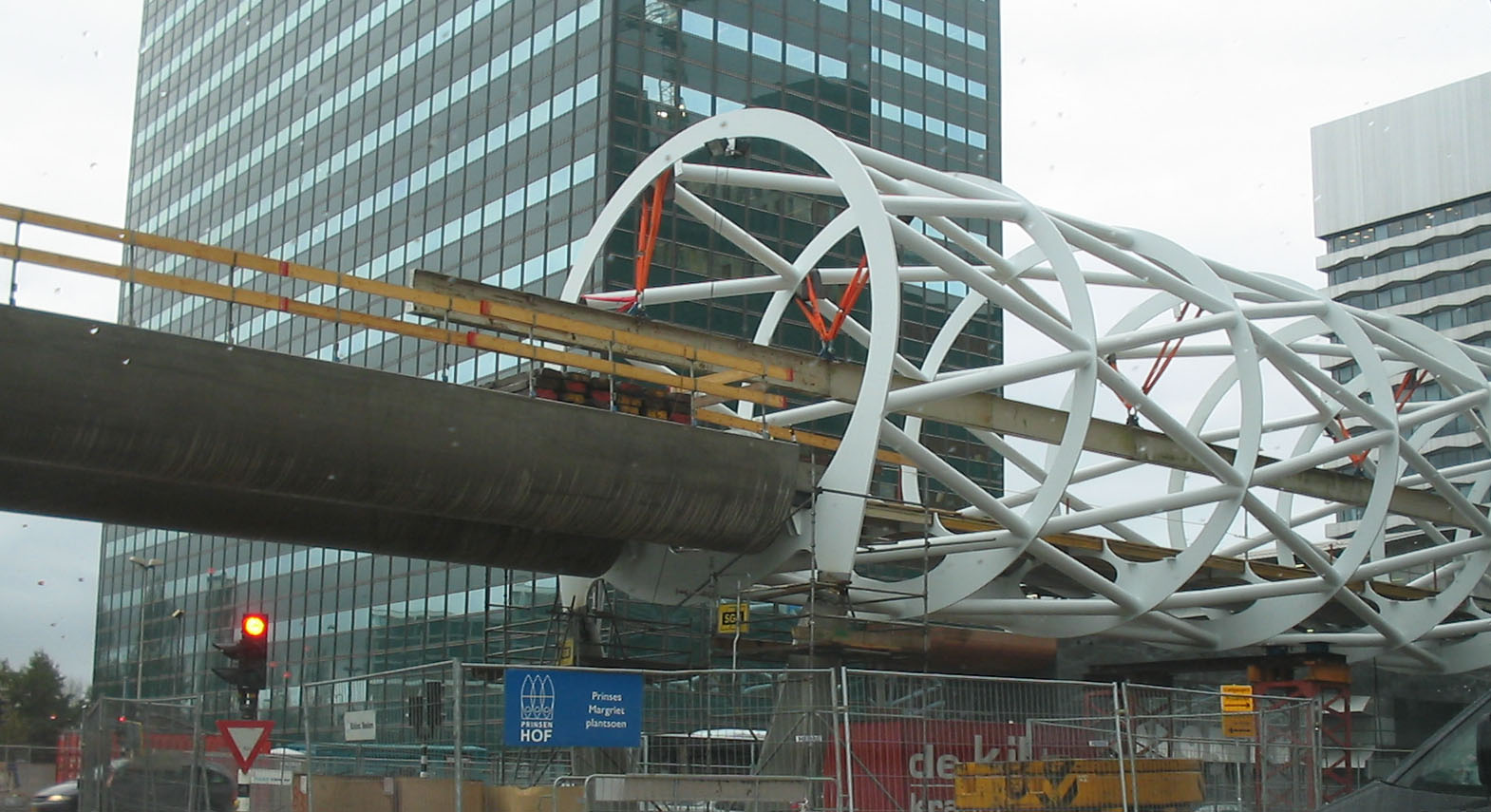
Construction of Beatrixkwartier station

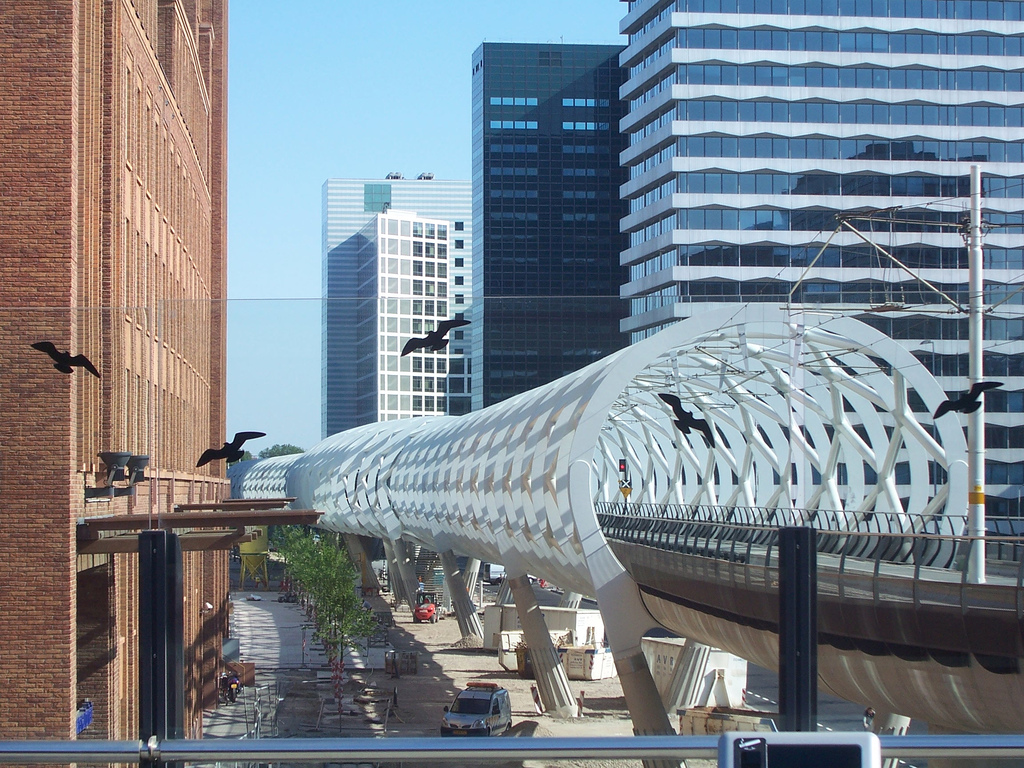
Beatrixkwartier station

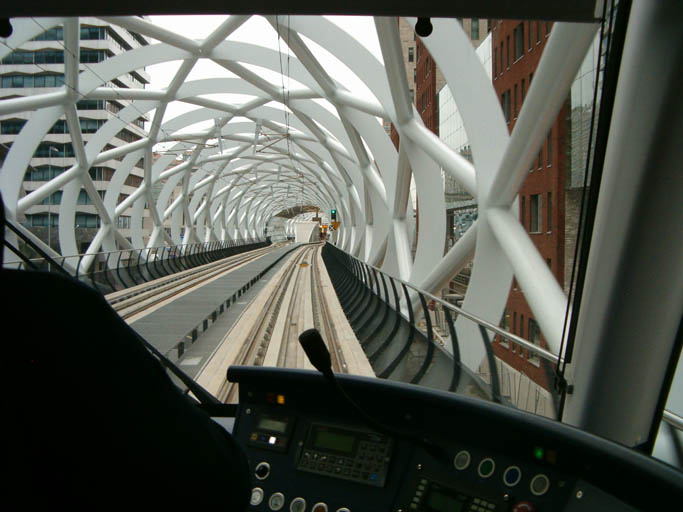
Approaching Beatrixkwartier station
