= De la Reyweg RandstadRail station =

De la Reyweg
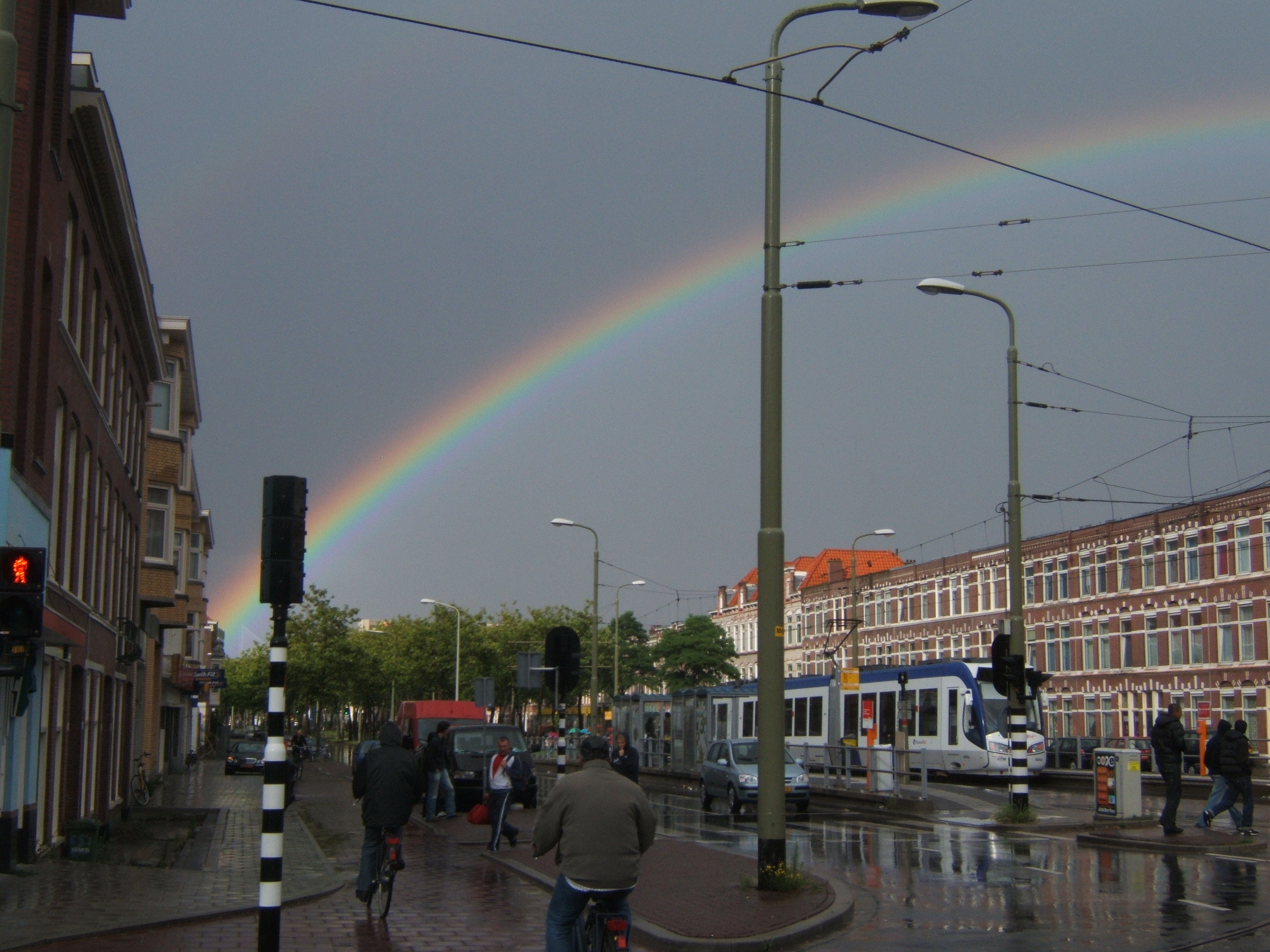

General information
- Location: Netherlands
- Coordinates: 52°04′15″N 4°17′07″E

Services
Preceding station	RandstadRail	Following station
Monstersestraat towards Lansingerland-Zoetermeer	Line 4 (HTM)	Dierenselaan towards De Uithof
Location
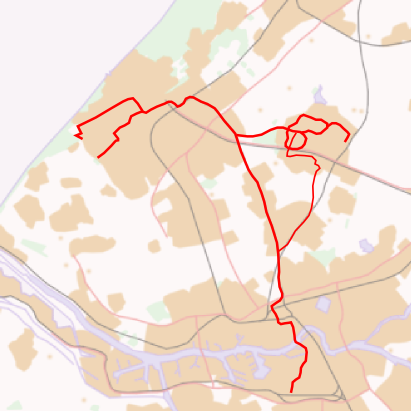
- Location within RandstadRail network

De la Reyweg is a RandstadRail stop in Den Haag, the Netherlands.

== History ==
The station is a stop for lines 2 and 4 and is on the Loosduinseweg. Line 12 stops nearby on the De la Reyweg. Passengers should change between lines 2 and 4 here.

== RandstadRail services ==
The following services currently call at De la Reyweg:

Service	Route	Material	Frequency
RR4	De Uithof - Beresteinaan - Bouwlustlaan - De Rade - Dedemsvaart - Zuidwoldepad- Leyenburg - Monnickendamplein - Tienhovenselaan - Dierenselaan - De la Reyweg - Monstersestraat - HMC Westeinde - Brouwersgracht - Grote Markt - Spui - Den Haag Centraal - Beatrixkwartier - Laan van NOI - Voorburg 't Loo - Leidschendam-Voorburg - Forepark - Leidschenveen - Voorweg (Low Level) - Centrum West - Stadhuis - Palenstein - Seghwaert - Willem Dreeslaan - Oosterheem - Javalaan - Van Tuyllpark - Lansingerland-Zoetermeer	HTM RegioCitadis Tram	6x per hour (Monday - Saturday, Every 10 Minutes), 4x per hour (Sundays and evenings, after 7pm, Every 15 Minutes)

== Tram Services ==
Service	Operator	Route
2	HTM	Kraayensteinlaan - Kapelaan Meereboerweg - Loosduinse Hoofdstraat - Burgemeester Hovylaan - Buitentuinen - Walnootstraat - Thorbeckelaan - Nieuwendamlaan - Laan van Eik en Duinen - Kamperfoeliestraat - Valkenboslaan - Fahrenheitstraat - De la Reyweg - Monstersestraat - HMC Westeinde - Brouwersgracht - Grote Markt - Spui - Centraal Station - Ternoot - Oostinje - Stuyvesantstraat - Station Laan van NOI - Bruijnings Ingenhoeslaan - Mgr. van Steelaan - Prinses Beatrixlaan - Voorburg 't Loo - Elzendreef - Essesteijn - Leidsenhage - HMC Antoniushove

== Connecting Tram Service ==
Service	Operator	Route
12	HTM	Markenseplein - Tholensestraat - Doctor van Welylaan - Sportlaan - Goudenregenplein - Goudenregenstraat - Fahrenheitstraat - Copernicusplein - Weimarstraat - Cartesiusstraat - Loosduinseweg - Paul Krugerplein - Delftselaan - Haagse Markt - Hoefkade - Wouwermanstraat - Jacob Catsstraat - Station Hollands Spoor - Rijswijkseplein

== Gallery ==
RandstadRail Network Map

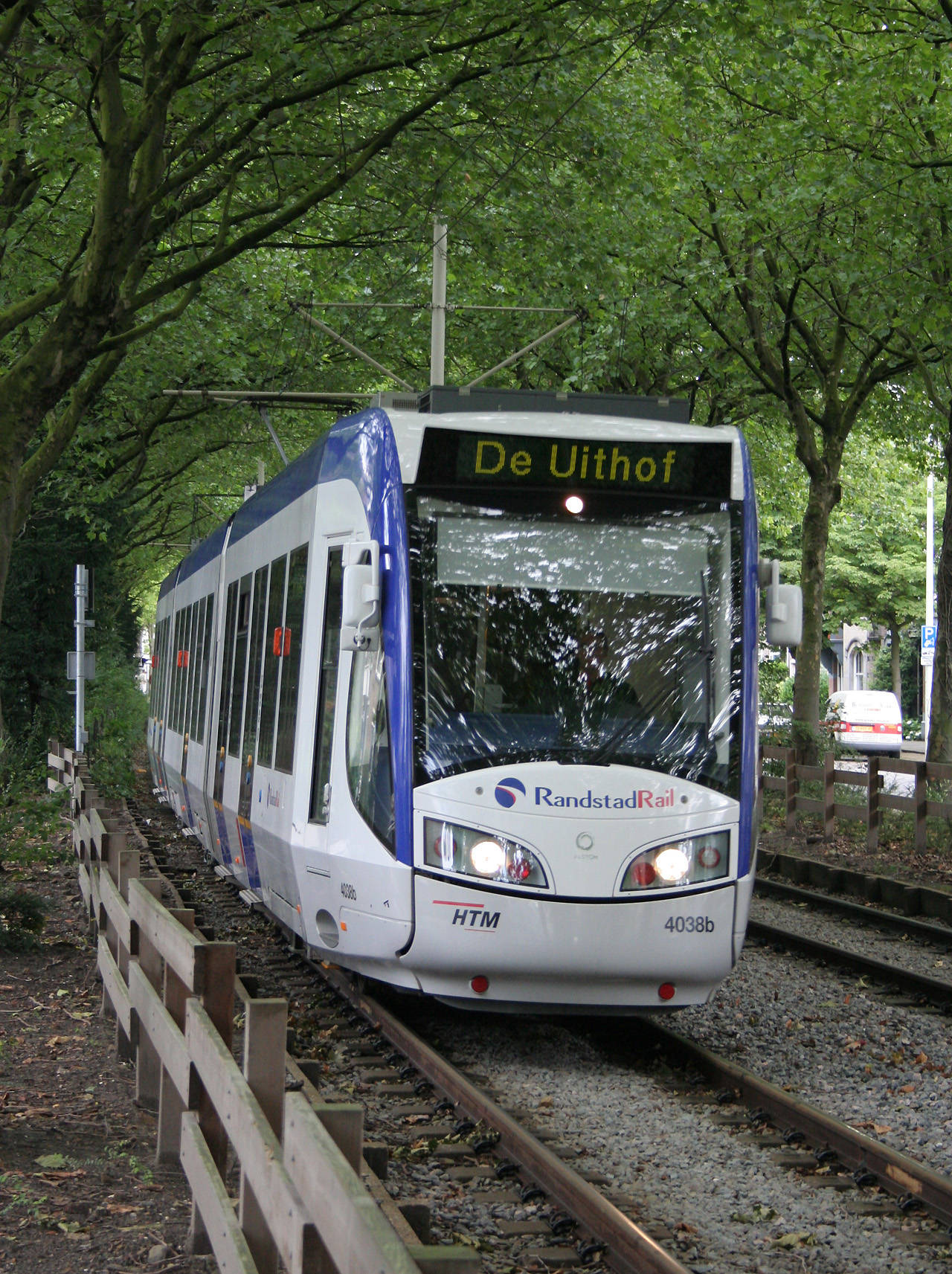
A RegioCitadis on RR4

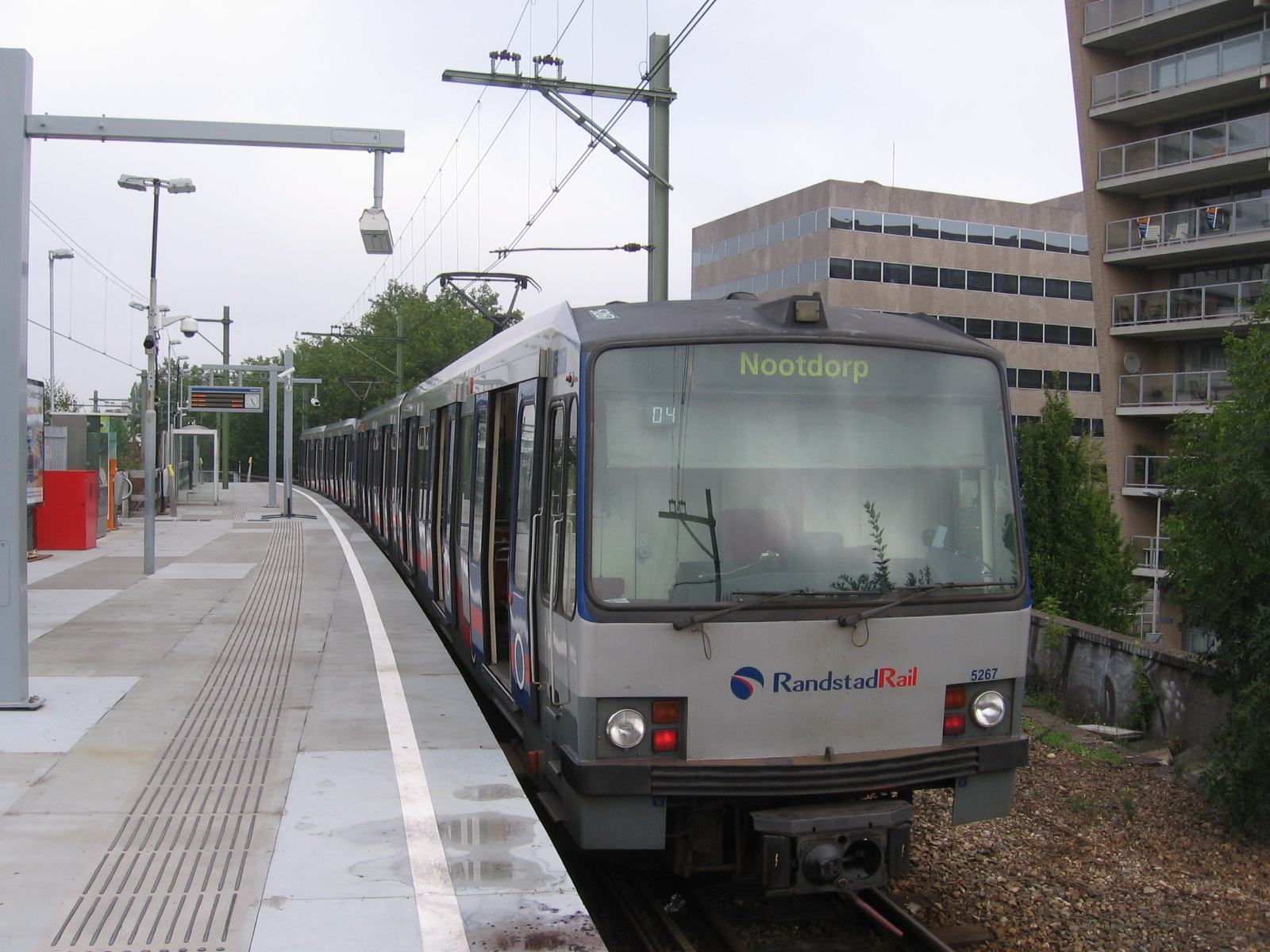
An RET Metro set that was converted for RandstadRail operation.

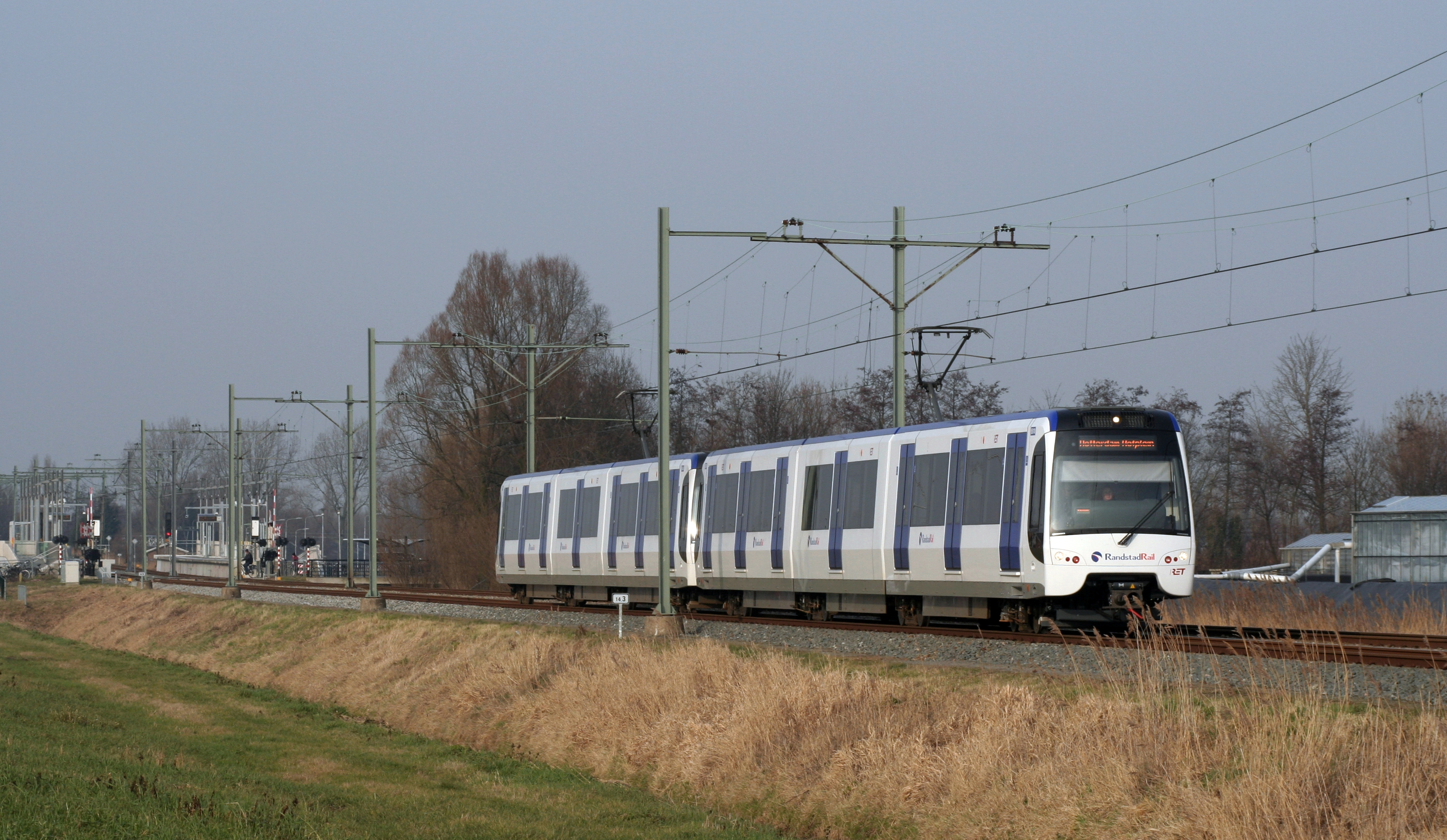
A new RET RandstadRail set, which replaced the Metro sets.
