= Matilo =

Former Roman fort in Netherlands

Coordinates: 52.1497°N 4.5184°E

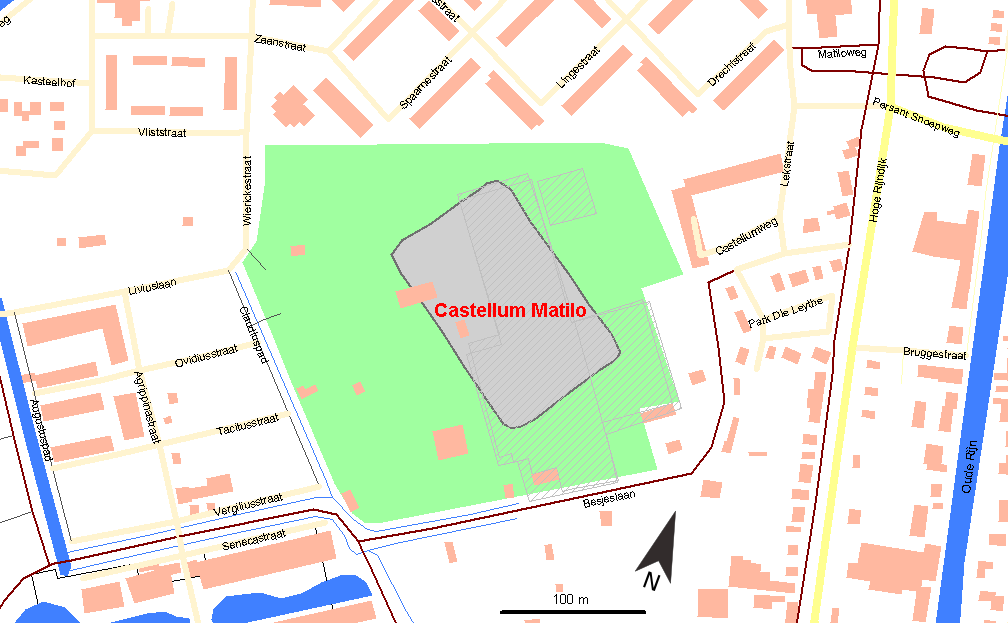
Matilo's location in Leiden

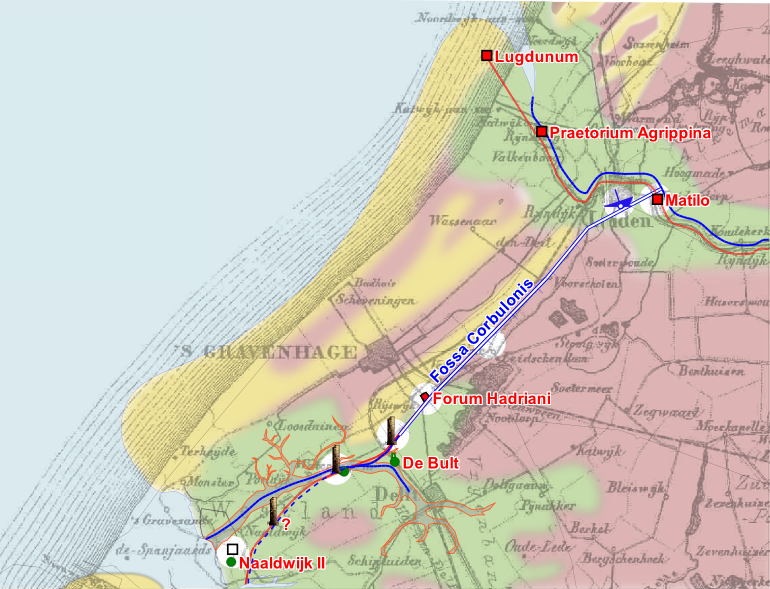
Map of the coast in Roman times superimposed on South Holland today, showing Matilo's location

Matilo or Matilone was once a Roman fort (castellum) in modern-day Leiden. Positioned on the southern banks of the Oude Rijn, it served to protect the Roman borders in the province of Germania Inferior (Limes Germanicus). On the Peutinger map, it lies between the encampments of Albaniana (Alphen aan den Rijn) and Praetorium Agrippinae (Valkenburg). The seventh-century Ravenna Cosmography cites the name in the accusative case as Matellionem.

== Name ==
Matilo probably derives its name from a body of water near which it was situated, as is usually the case with Roman place-names ending in -on, -one, -an or -ane. (Note: Compare for example the castella Fectio and Deusone.) This particular water body had most likely already received its name before Roman settlement along the Oude Rijn. It is therefore of Celtic or Germanic origin and its meaning remains unclear.

== History ==
Due to lack of any evidence predating Roman finds, archaeologists usually conclude that the Romans were the first to settle in this particular location. (Note: An axe of dubious origin throws a different light on this debate. Most scholars dismiss this piece of evidence however as doubtful.) Before their arrival, people mostly lived further from the river.

The first Romans arrived at the site in 47 AD as part of a larger operation to reinforce the Germanic lines. In order to increase the efficiency of supply chains and communication lines within his army, general Gnaeus Domitius Corbulo had a canal built (known as the Fossa Corbulonis, or Corbulo's Canal), connecting the Meuse and Rhine. Matilo was erected there, at the meeting place of the Oude Rijn and the newly dug canal, because of its strategic importance.

Archaeological evidence seems to suggest that the Romans only constructed the fort itself somewhere at around 70 AD, whereas a small watchtower might have taken its place in the years before. The construction of Matilo therefore immediately followed the Batavian Rebellion in 69 and as such played an important role in restoring order to the province of Germania Inferior.

Somewhere between 85 and 116, the moat was palisaded and between 130 and 196 AD the Romans added three moats and rebuilt the armoury (armamentarium) in stone. They did this once more sometime in 196–243, and replaced the wooden outer wall with a stone one as well. The wall and moats were then rebuilt once more after that.

This castellum was home to the cohors XV Voluntarium from the last quarter of the first century up to at least 196–198, the cohors I Lucensium (Hispanorum) occupied the outpost during Trajan's reign (103 or 110) and another inscription mentions the Numerus Exploratorum Batavorum (Antoniniarum). Archaeological findings of ammunition for an onager indicate that an artillery division was once garrisoned there.

== Bibliography ==
- Brandenburg, C.R. & Hessing, W.A.M. (2005) Matilo - Rodenburg - Roomburg: De Roomburgerpolder van Romeins castellum tot moderne woonwijk (Amersfoort).
- Lems, E. (1995) Op zoek naar Matilo: Sporen van de Romeinen in Leiden (Leiden).
