= Albaniana (Roman fort) =

Former Roman fort in The Netherlands

Coordinates: 52.1292°N 4.6614°E

- Roman fort / Archaeological site
- Interactive map of Albaniana
- Country: Netherlands
- Province / Region: South Holland / Rhine region
- Modern municipality: Alphen aan den Rijn
- Built: c. 40–41 AD
- Abandoned: c. 270 AD

Albaniana was the name the ancient Romans gave a settlement on the southern banks of Rhine river, some 40 kilometers from its mouth in the North Sea, known as Alfen and modern-day Alphen aan den Rijn, Netherlands. They built a military fort (Latin: castellum) there, as part of a range strategically built encampments, to protect and guard the river, frontier (limes) of the Roman Empire and main transport route of goods and troops. The historical map Tabula Peutingeriana situates the settlement in between Matilo (Leiden) and Praetorium Agrippinae (Valkenburg) downstream and Nigrum Pullum (Zwammerdam) and Fectio (Vechten) upstream. The village was mentioned in Antoninus' register of roads Itinerarium Antonini from the 3rd century. The fortress must have been surrounded by a wall of earth and wooden poles, with gates and watch towers.

== History ==
The origin of Alphen aan den Rijn can be dated back to approximately 40 AD. The town that now consists of over 70,000 inhabitants was than a rural settlement with little more than 100 inhabitants. The name Albaniana means "by the white waters". These white waters likely refer to the Old Rhine, where the army camp was situated.

=== Military fortress – castellum ===
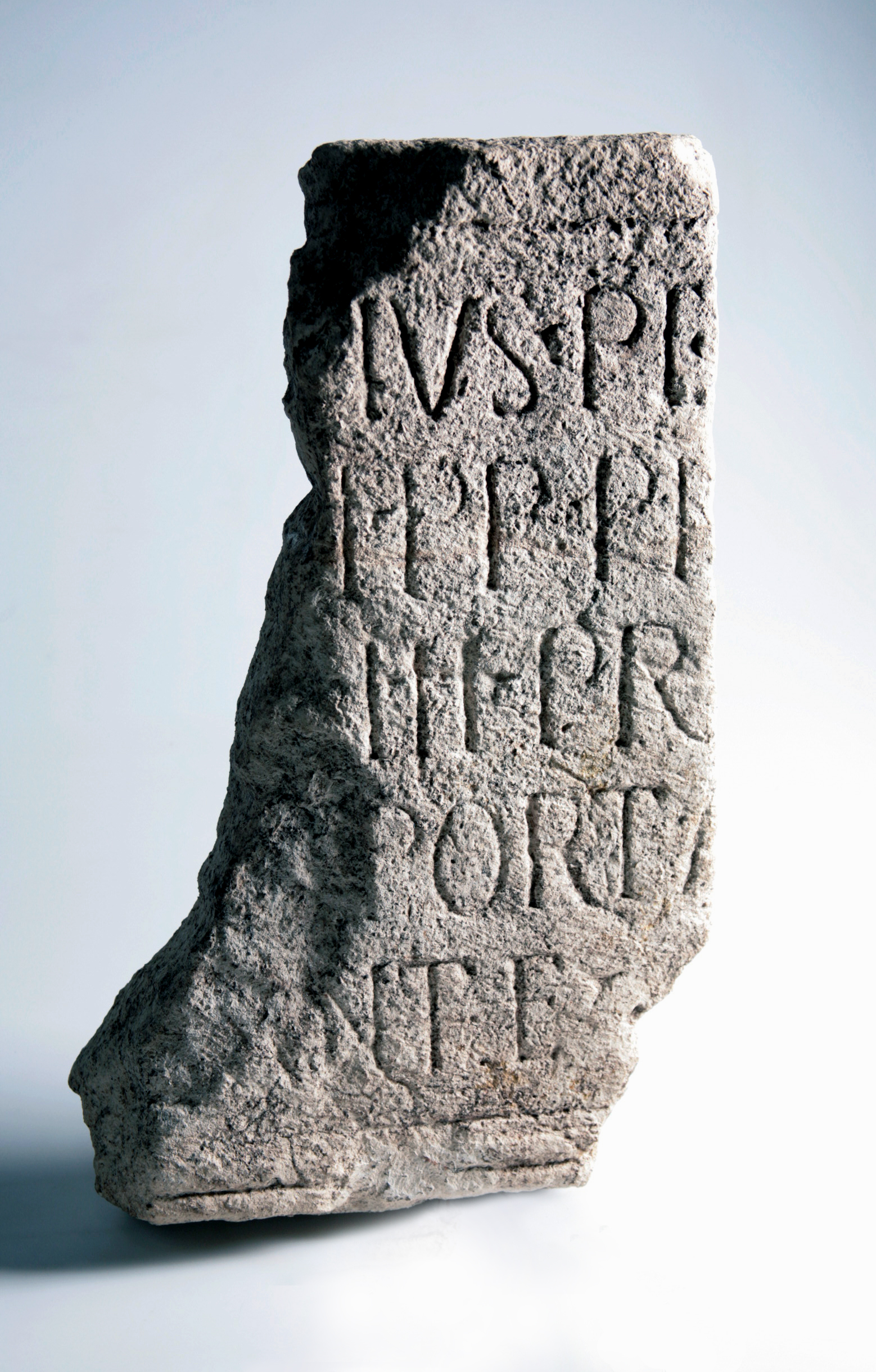
Fragment of the entrance gate, built during the reign of Septimius Severus

A dendrochronological dating of the wood enables us to say that the fort was built after the state visit of Caligula to Germania Inferior in AD 40–41. The wooden building was meant to protect the 'limes'; the Roman border consisting of the Rhine. Caligula built this fort with the idea of crossing over to Great Britain; this was not accomplished during his reign, although his successor Claudius succeeded. The building was an isolated outpost; few colonies were located nearby. The complex was exclusively made of wood. It had wooden outer walls and wooden watchtowers. Outside the walls canals were dug. This wall was approximately a hundred and twenty meters long and eighty meters wide. During the Revolt of the Batavi (between AD 69 and 70) the wall was demolished by the Cananefates; this was later rebuilt after the rebellion had been quelled. Around 160 AD, the wooden wall had been replaced by a brick wall. It was around this time that a new entrance gate was built, carrying an inscription referring to Emperor Septimius Severus. The reason for this was that Emperor Severus himself had given the order to repair the damages inflicted on the wall. During its glory days, the army camp consisted of approximately four hundred soldiers.

=== Local settlement – vicus ===
Similar to other Limes-forts, the Albaniana most probably was built close to a civilian settlement (vicus). Archaeological findings indicate that south-west of the fort, on higher grounds, locals offered their goods and services to the Romans. In this way, local Batavians and Cananefates mingled with Romans and mutually influenced each other.

=== After the second century ===
In the middle of the third century, presumably 270 AD, the castellum was vacated. All along the frontier German tribes crossed the Rhine and invaded the Roman Empire. Soldiers from the different forts could no longer withstand the enemy. German tribes plundered the castella. In medieval times the forts were used as quarries, after which the remains disappeared underground. These remnants were only rediscovered in the twentieth century. By then most of the area had been built upon, causing much to remain lost.

== Excavations ==
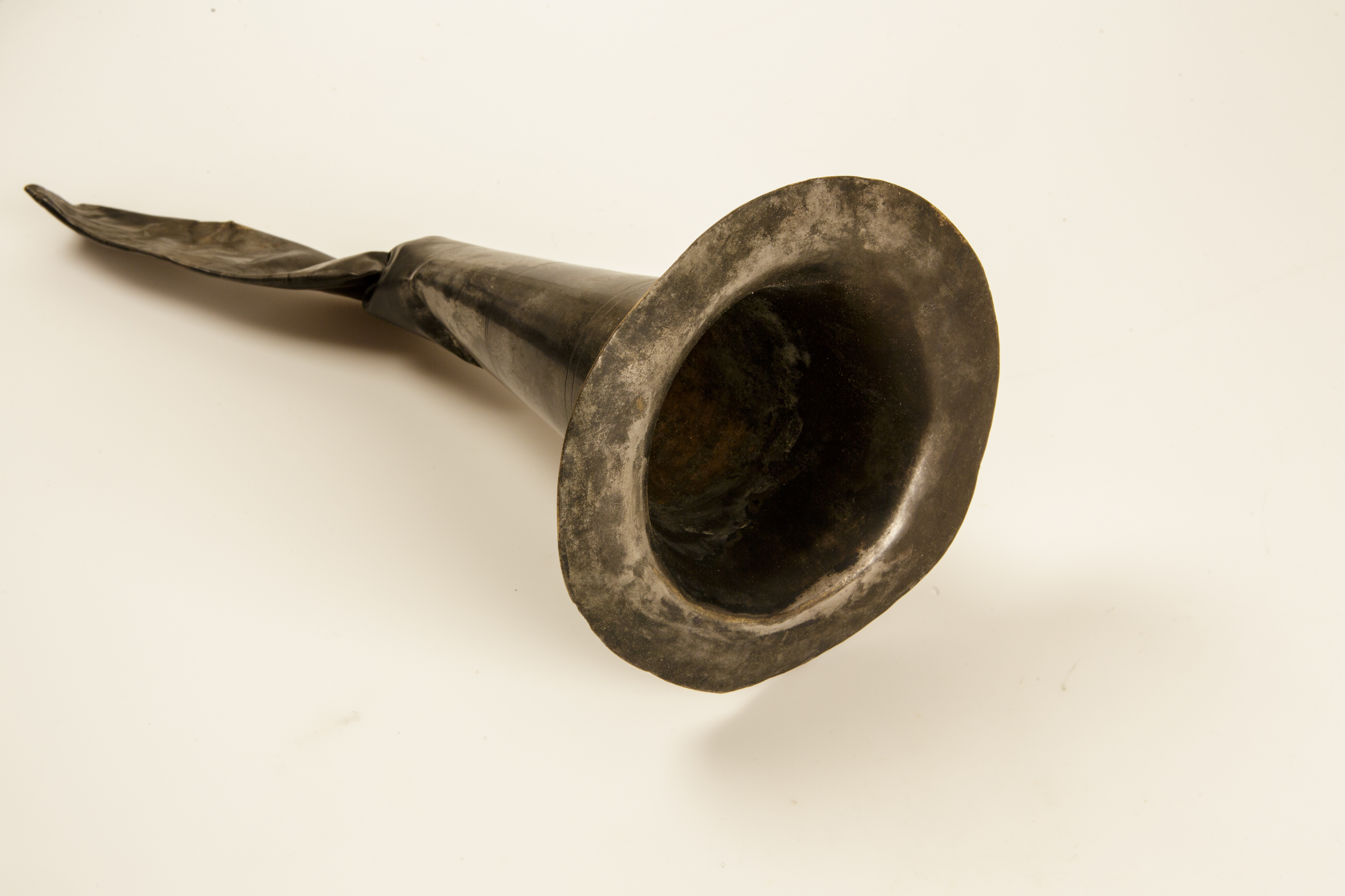
Almost complete musical instrument (horn or cornu), hammered bronze

In 1920, the director of the National Museum of Ethnology, Leiden professor Jan Hendrik Holwerda, visited the building site of a church in the center of Alphen and concluded from findings that the Romans had been living there. Castellum Albaniana has been excavated over a period of 60 years, whenever the possibility arose. In the early 1950s work had been done under the direction of Albert Egges van Giffen; from 1959 to 1978 under direction of Jules Bogaers and more systematically from 1978 to 1998 under direction of professor Jan Kees Haalebos, who could determined location and mapping of the fortress.

In 2001, extensive archaeological research started in the centre of Alphen aan den Rijn. These excavations yielded large quantities of finds, and since the remains of the castellum were found below groundwater level, they were very well preserved and included organic remains. Remnants of the castellum, the canabae located close by and cemeteries were discovered. Pieces of two elongated buildings that may have served as storage were found and wooden-floored barracks. Furthermore, a number of military and personal objects belonging to the Roman soldiers were identified, such as writing utensils, a mirror, and over eight hundred coins dating from the reign of Roman Emperors Tiberius, Caligula, Claudius and Nero (between 14–68 AD).

In addition, leftover food had been preserved, making it possible to research the farming techniques and eating habits of the soldiers. Foundations were exhumed, providing us with knowledge on building techniques used by the ancients Romans. In Albaniana stamps of the 'Classis Germanica', a Roman military fleet, were found. A number of these discovered artifacts can be seen in the Rijksmuseum van Oudheden in Leiden.

== Some findings ==
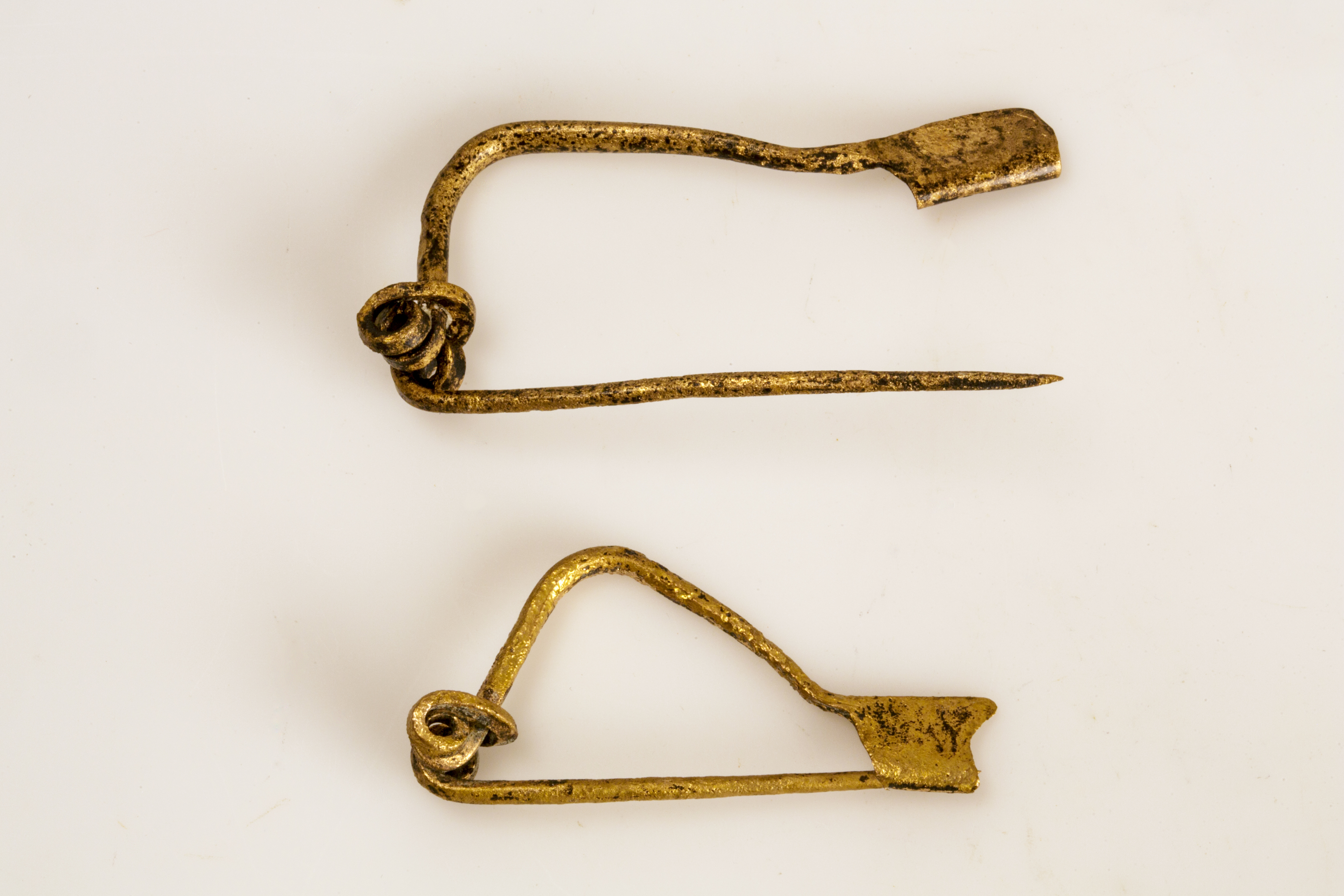
Fibula (safety pins)

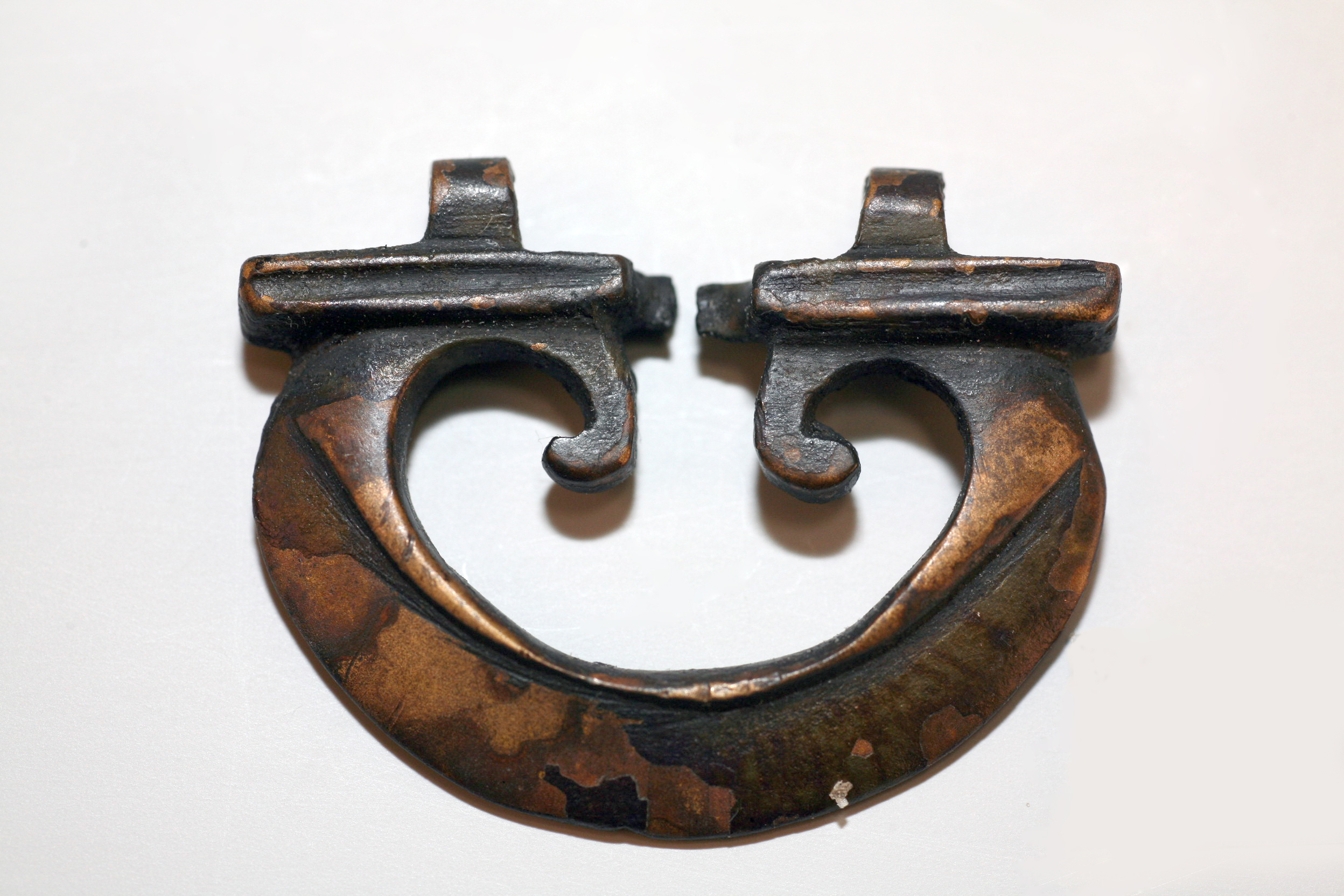
Bronze buckle

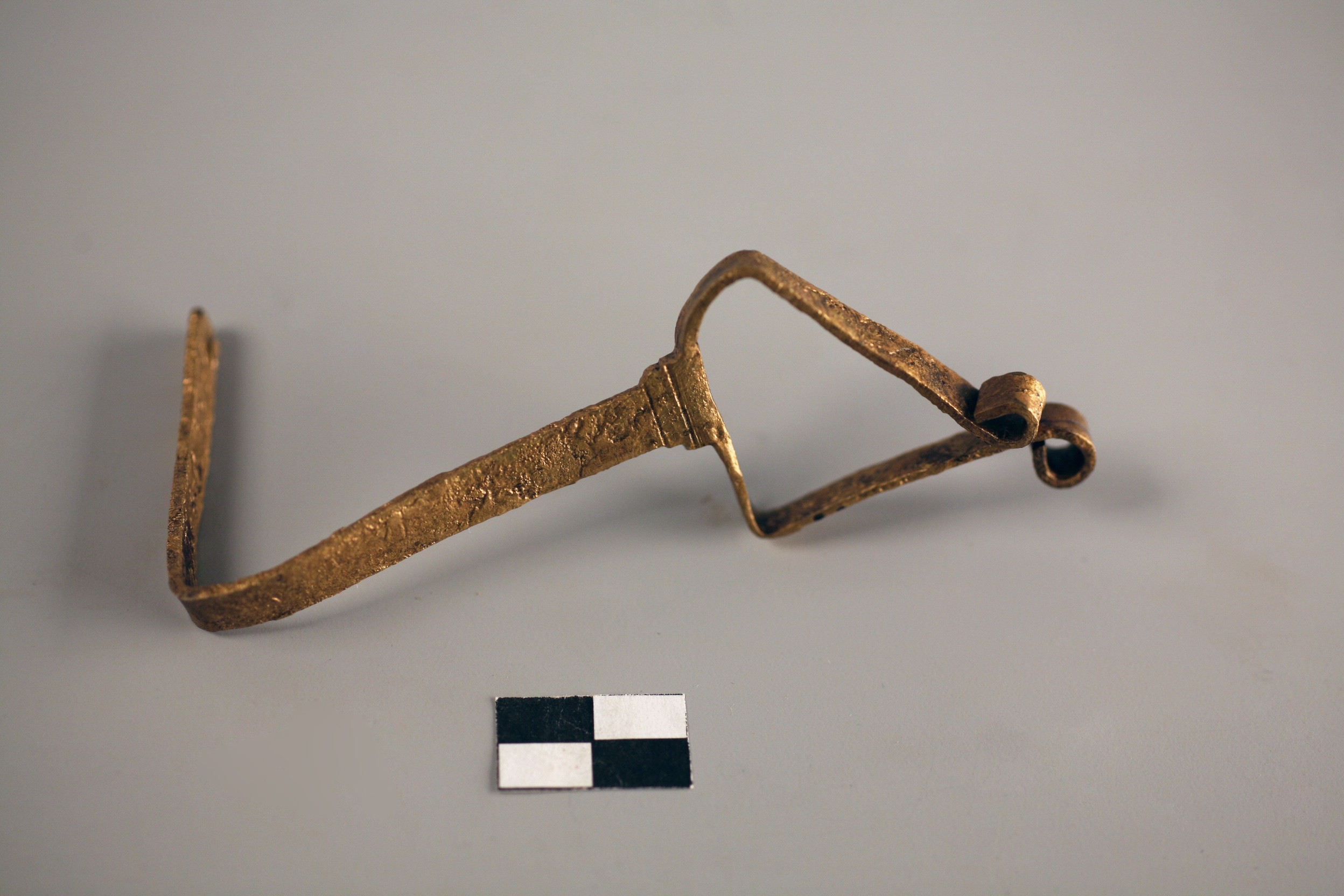
Bronze plume holder, part of a Roman helmet

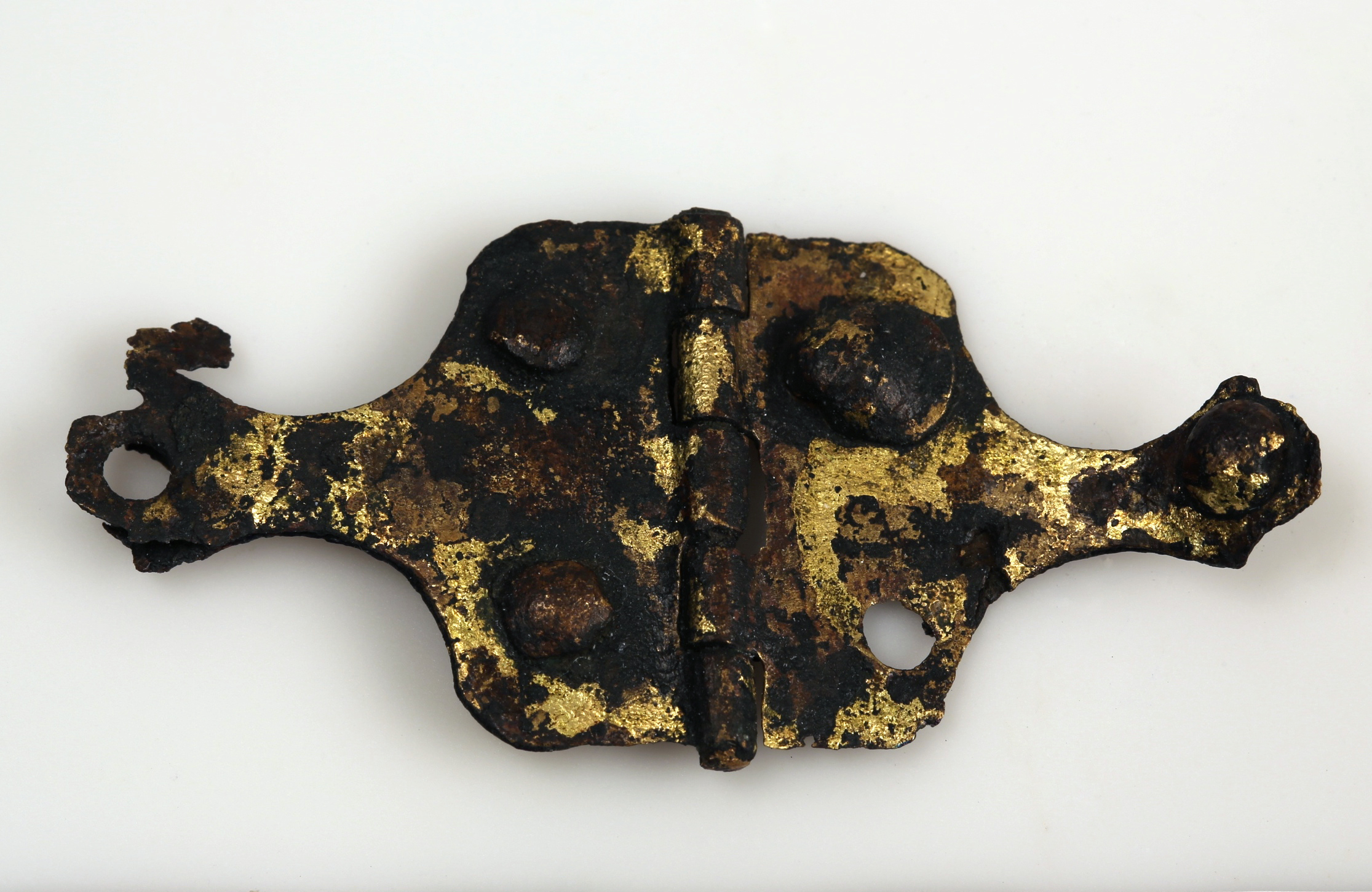
Armour buckle

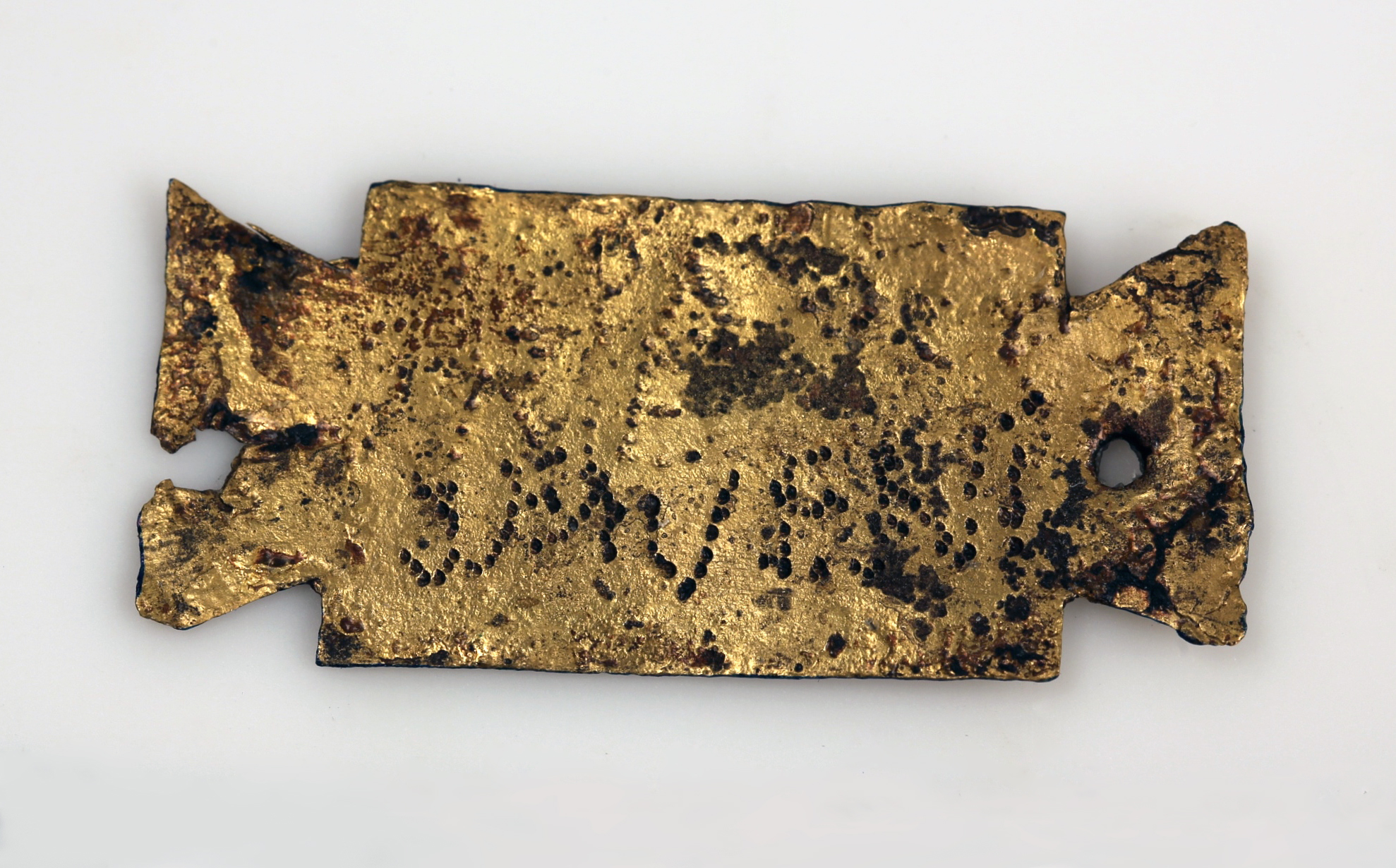
Nameplate, possibly centurio: L. Patrici Sabini

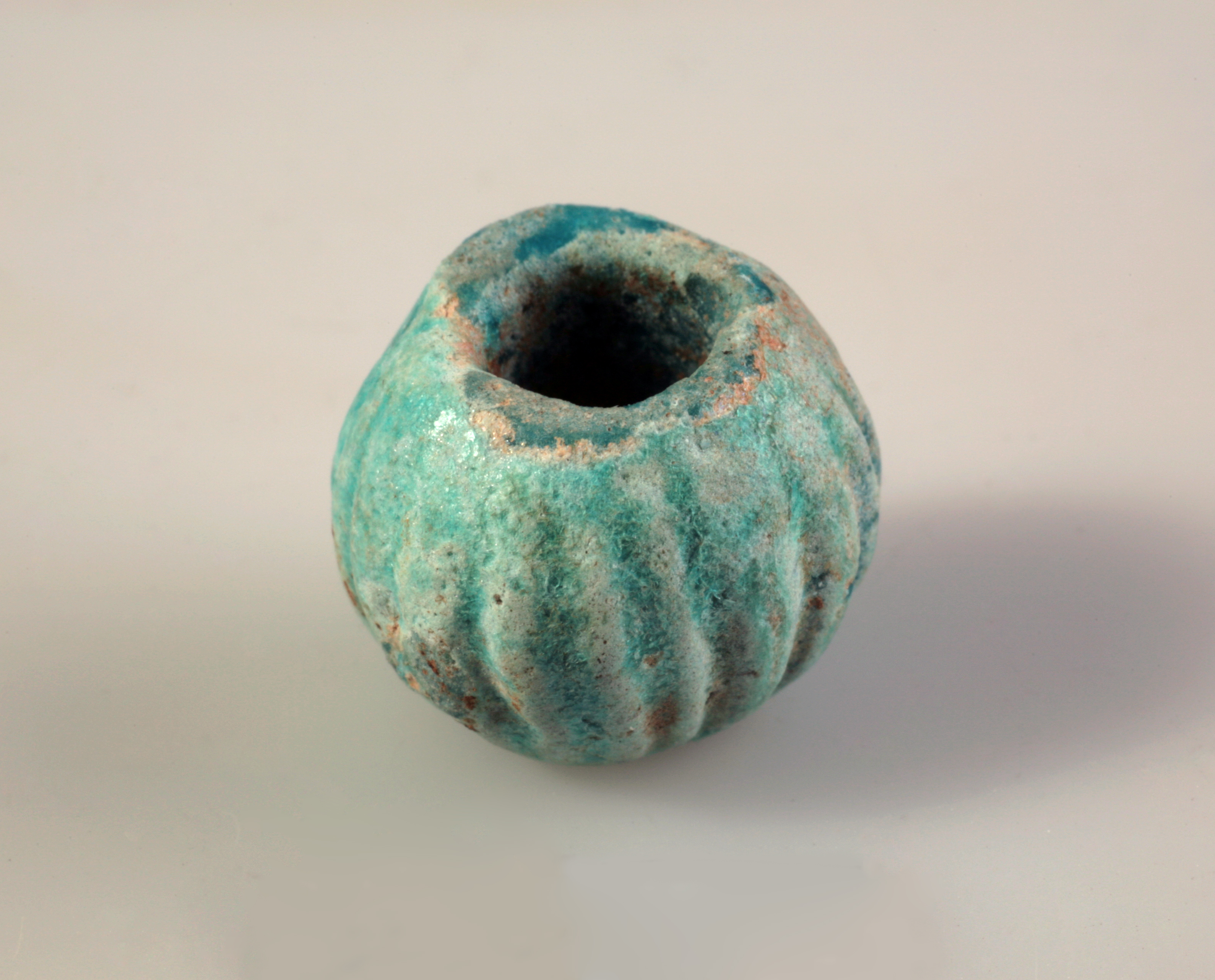
Melonbead

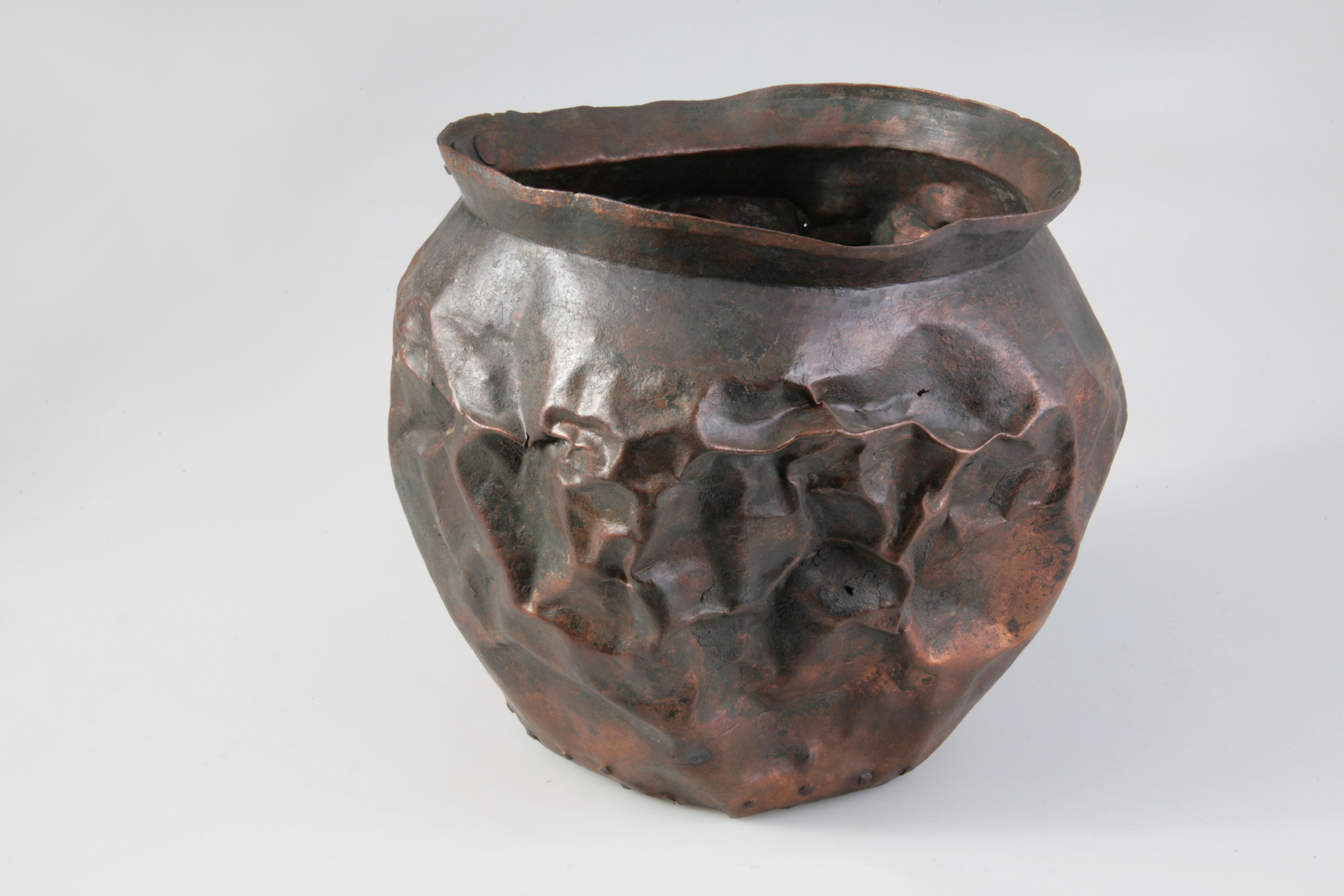
Bronze cooking pot, with repairs

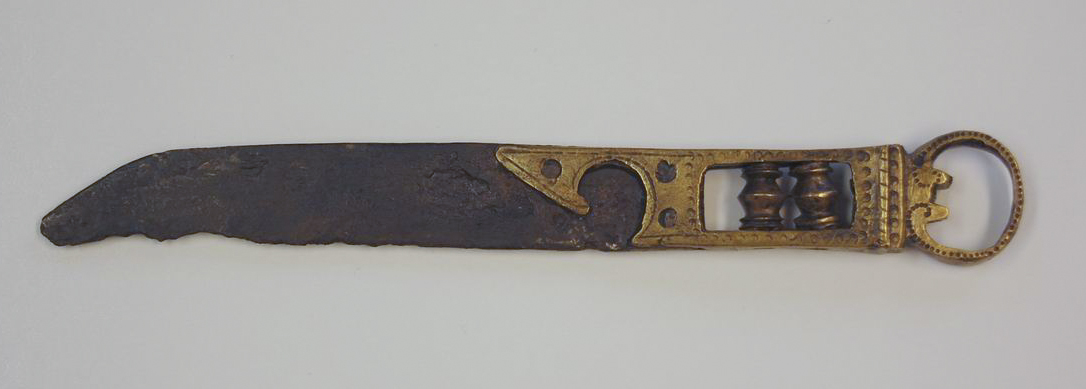
Iron fruit knife

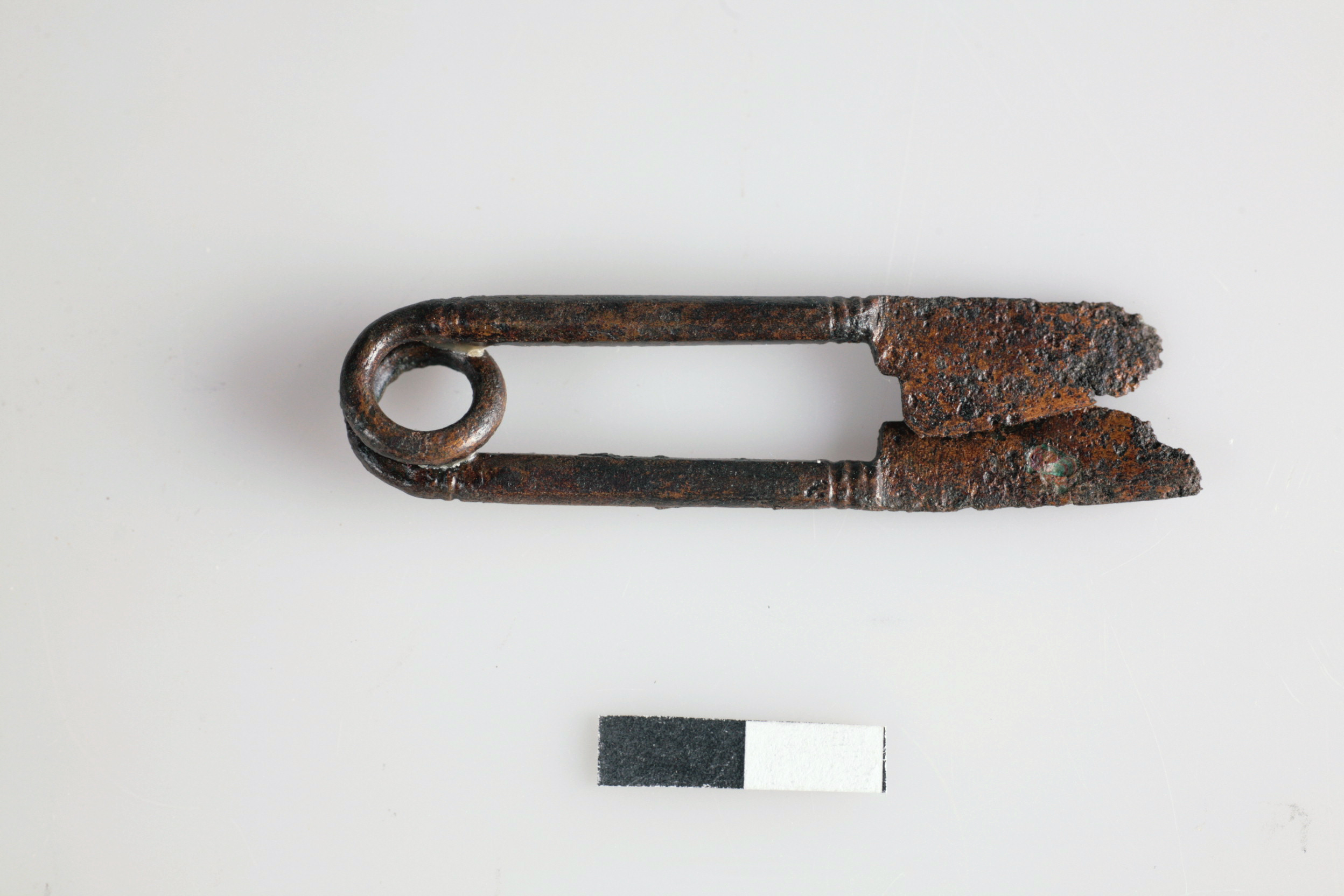
Scissors

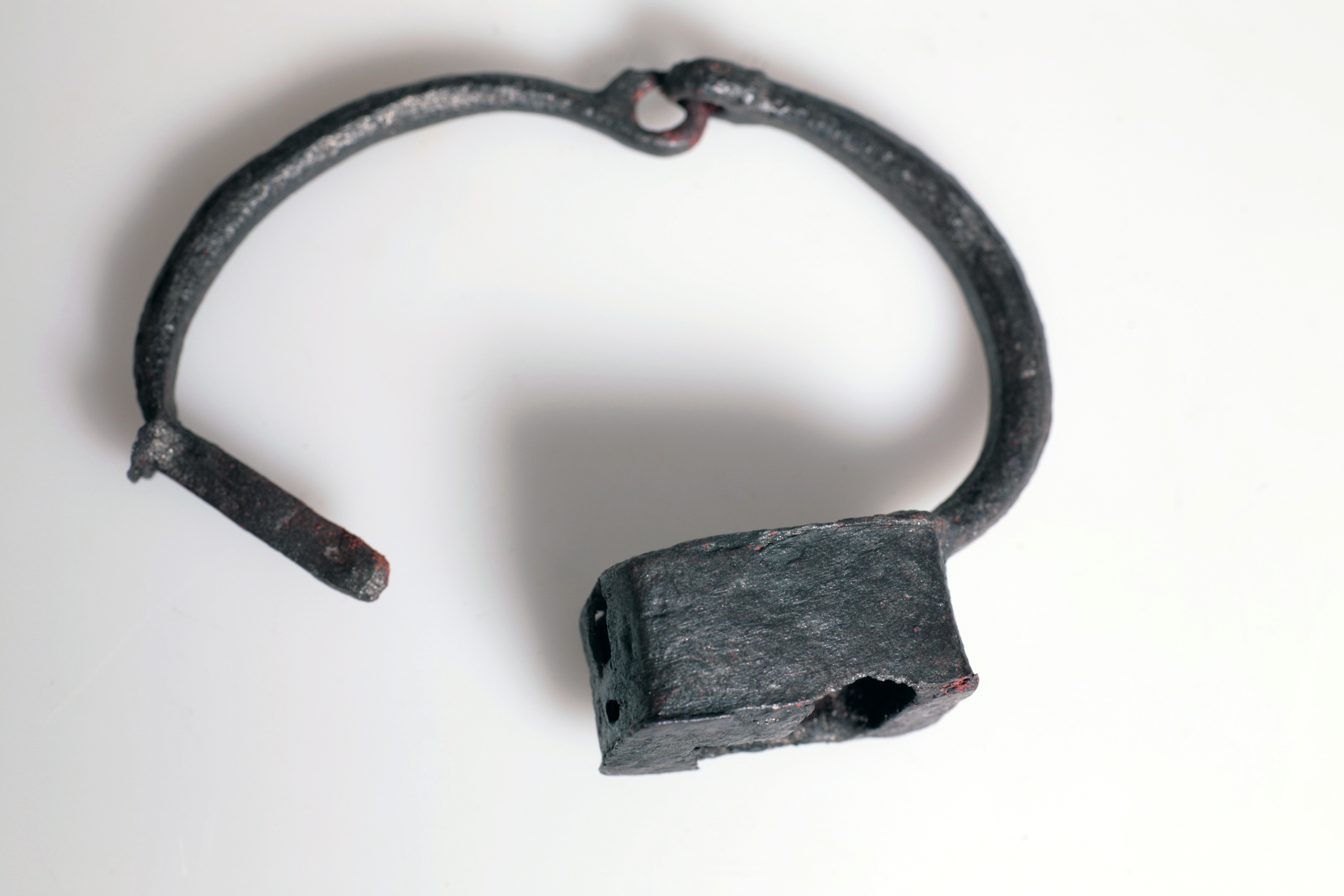
Handcuff

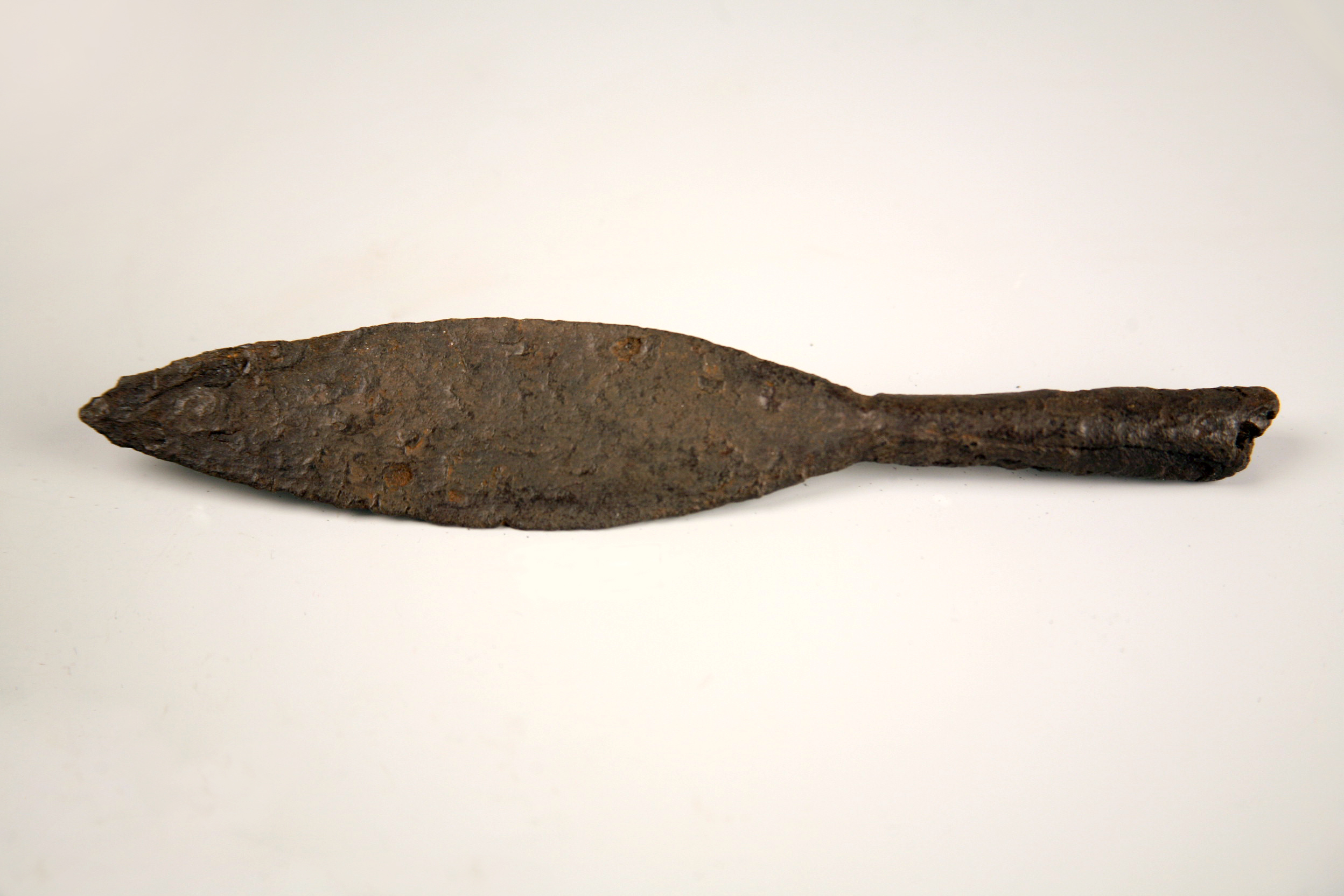
Iron lance head with part of wooden stick

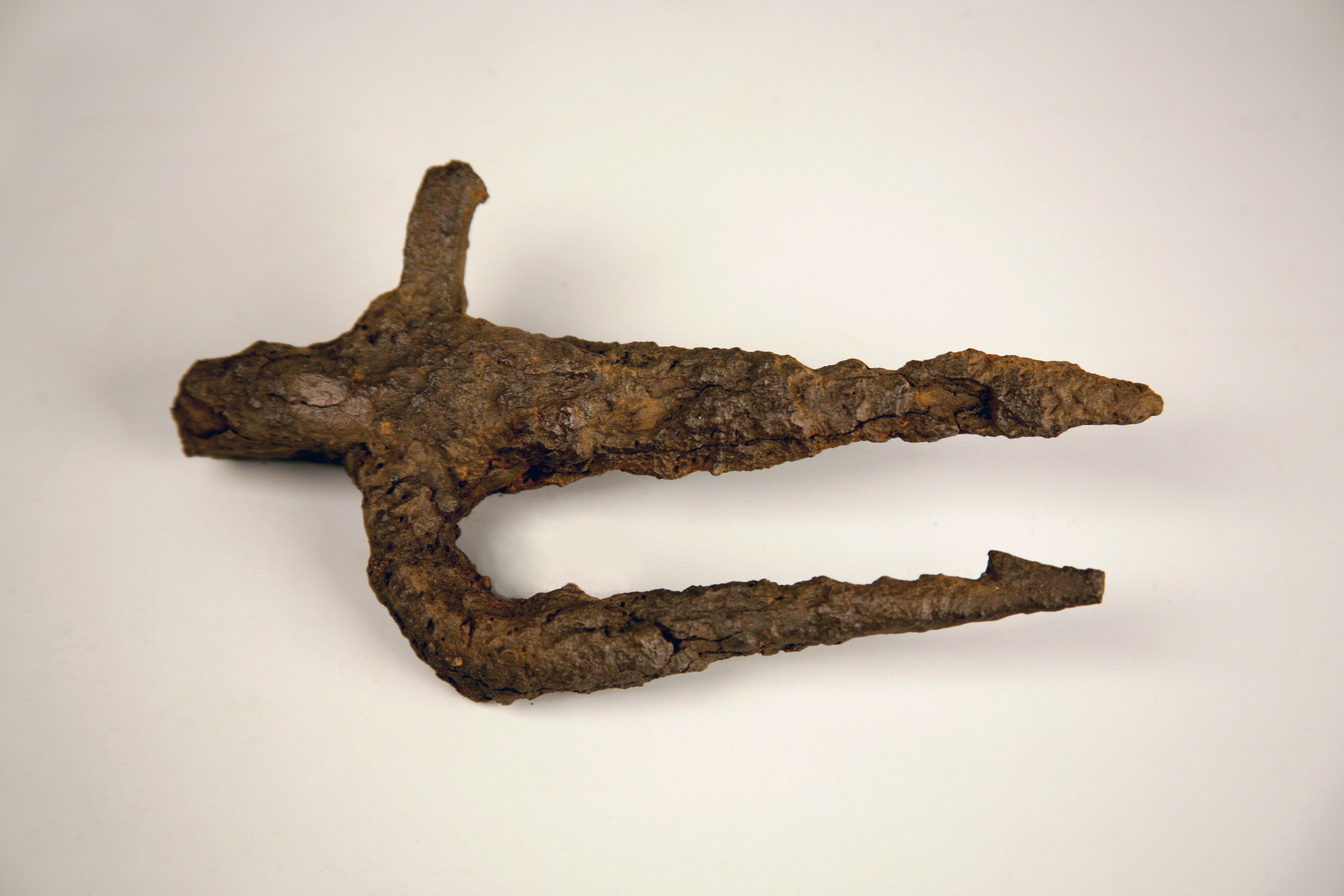
Iron trident or Neptunefork

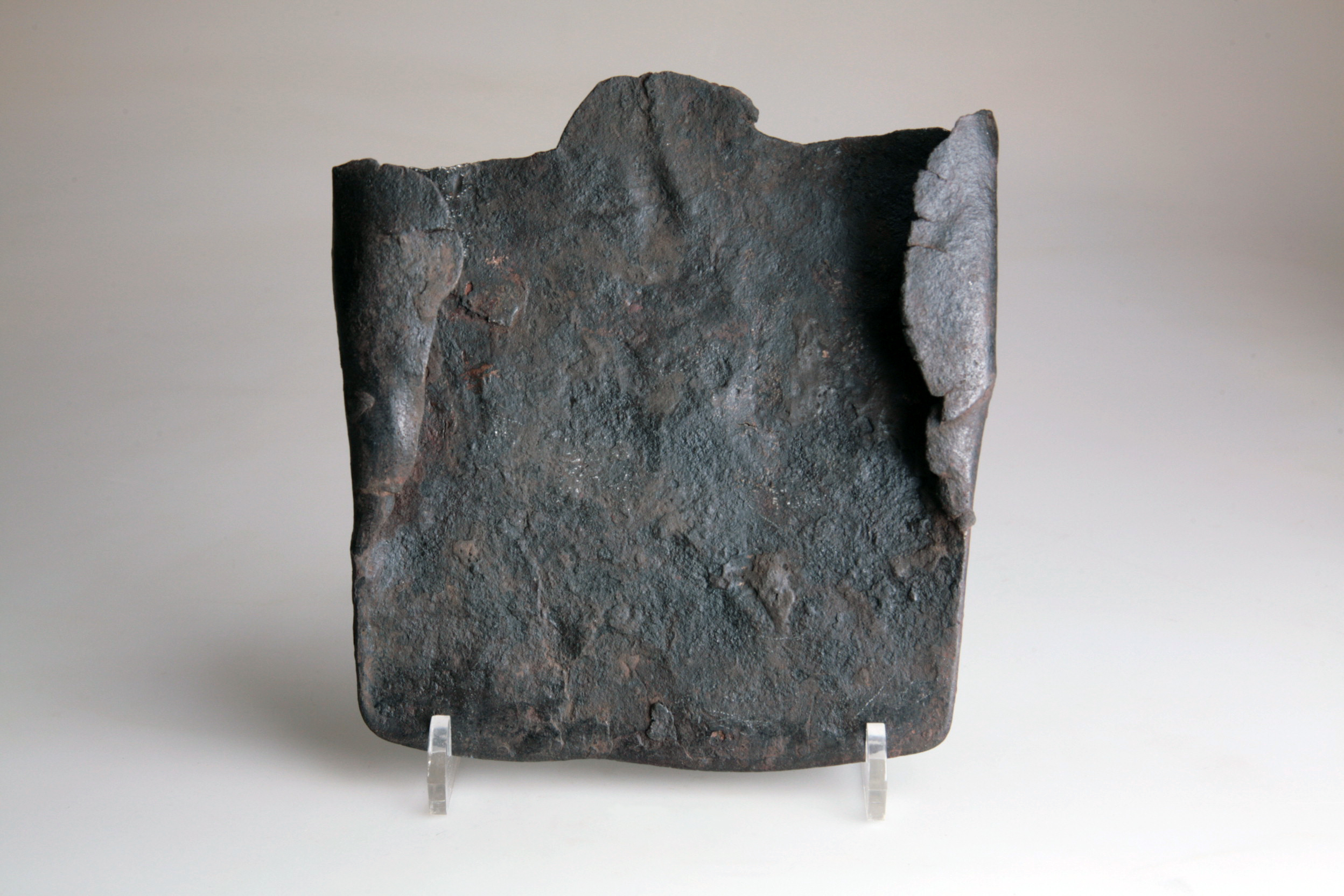
Spade

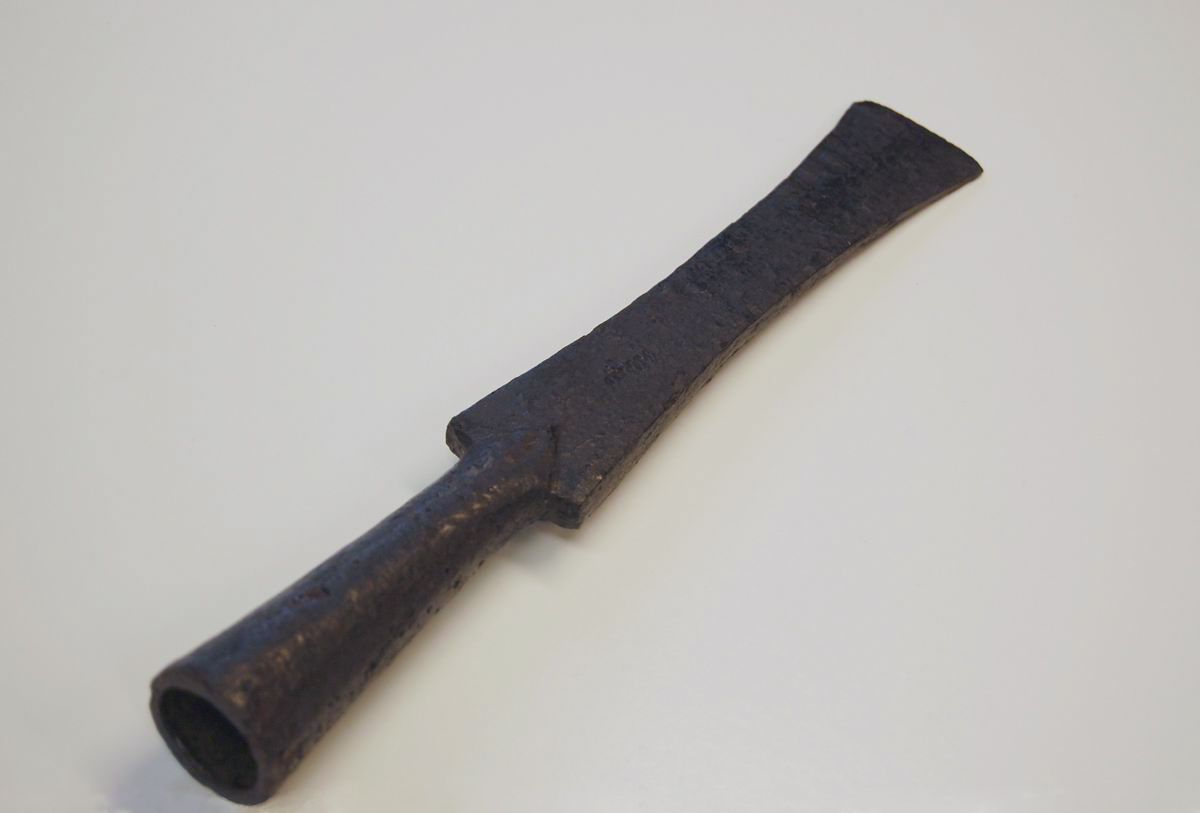
Iron firmer chisel

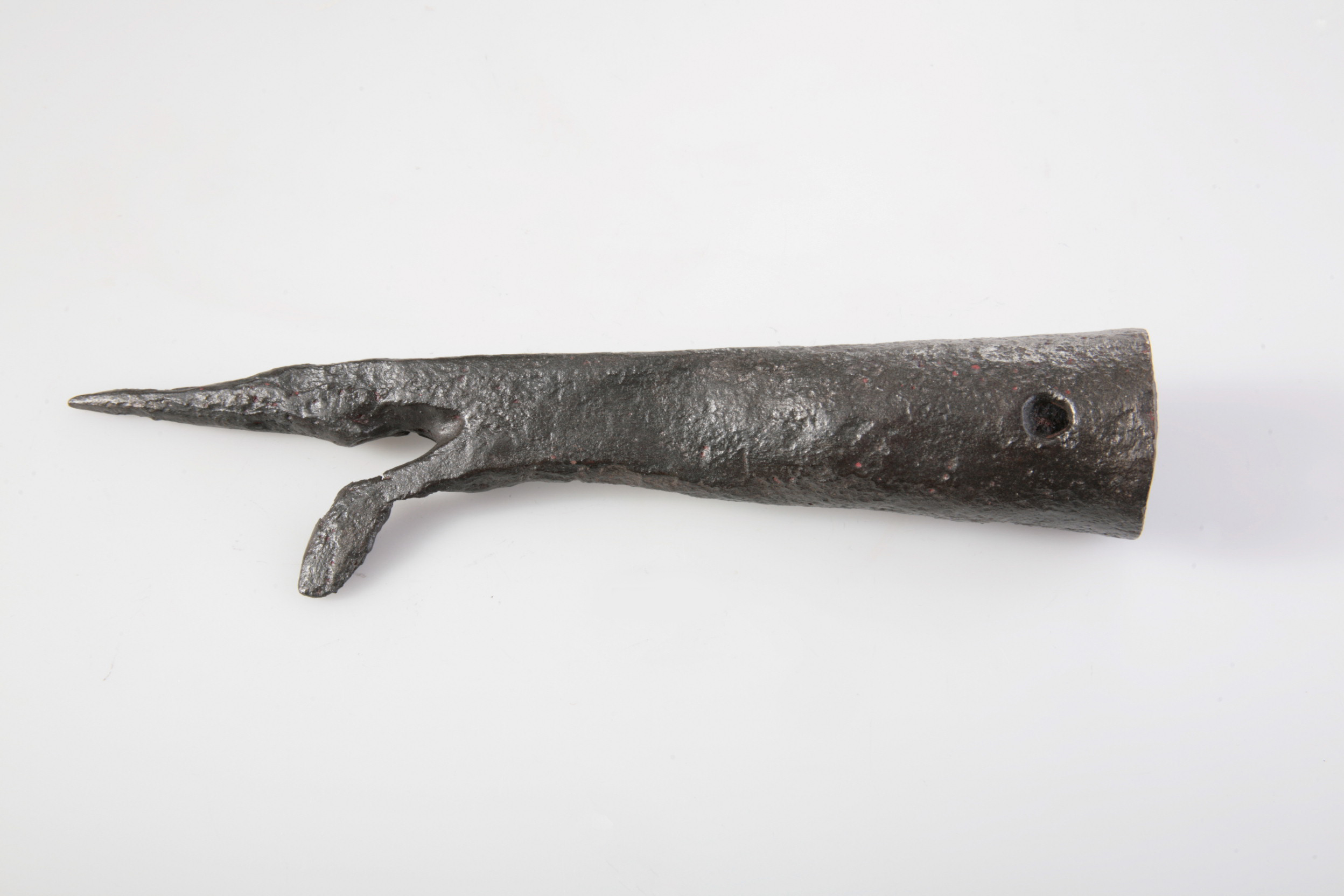
Iron boathook

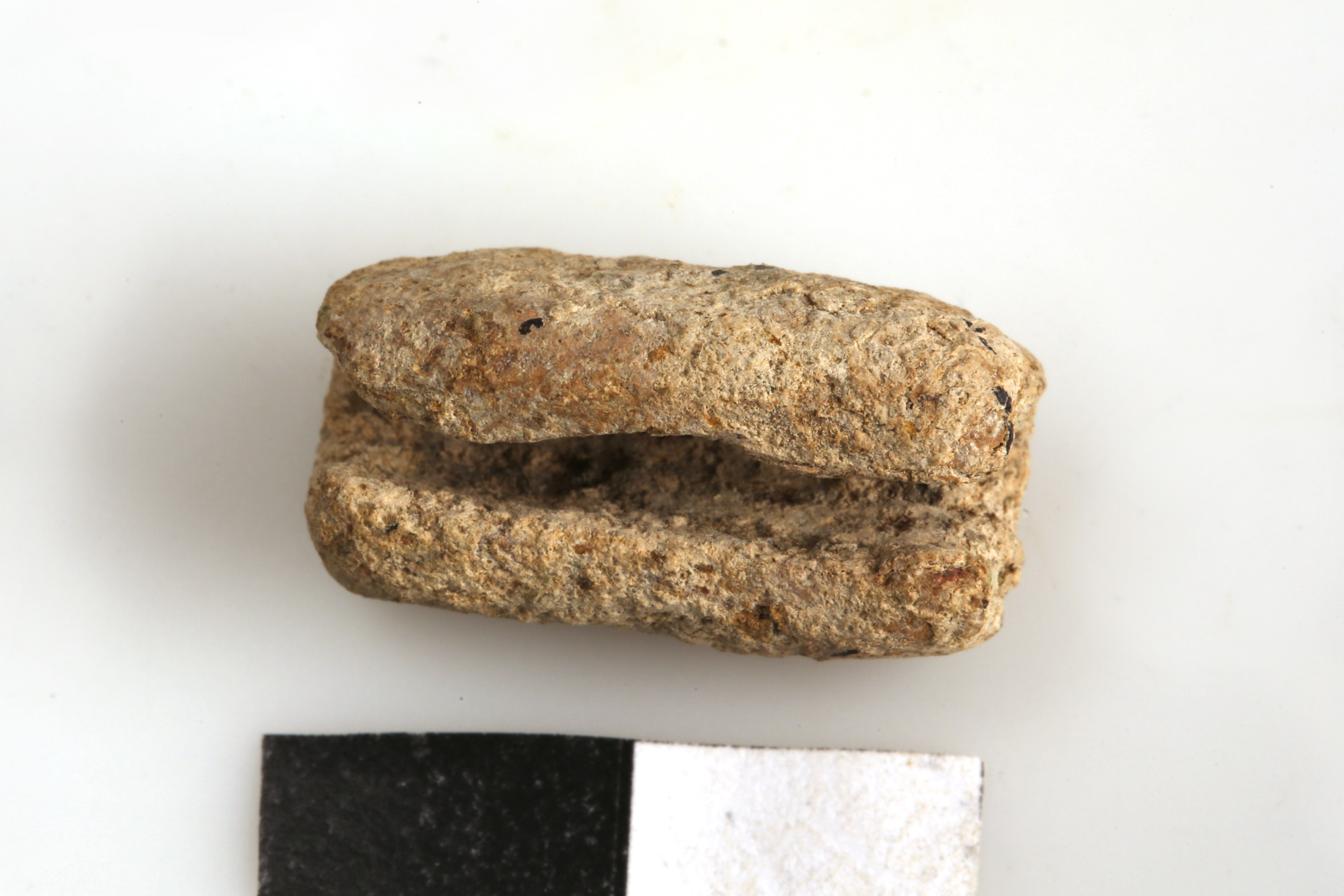
Fishing lead

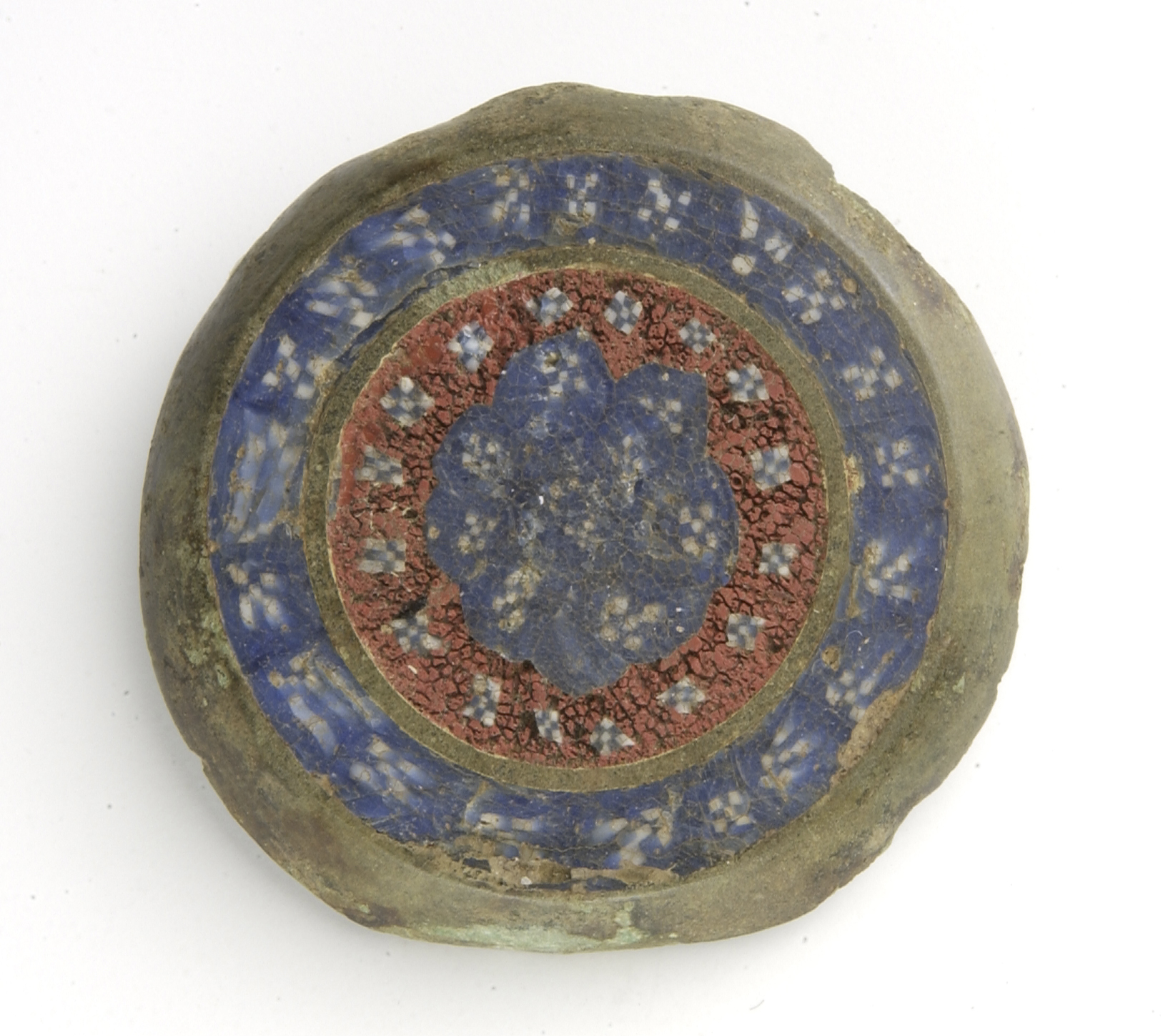
Decoration for horse, excavated at De Schans where a civilian settlement has been located

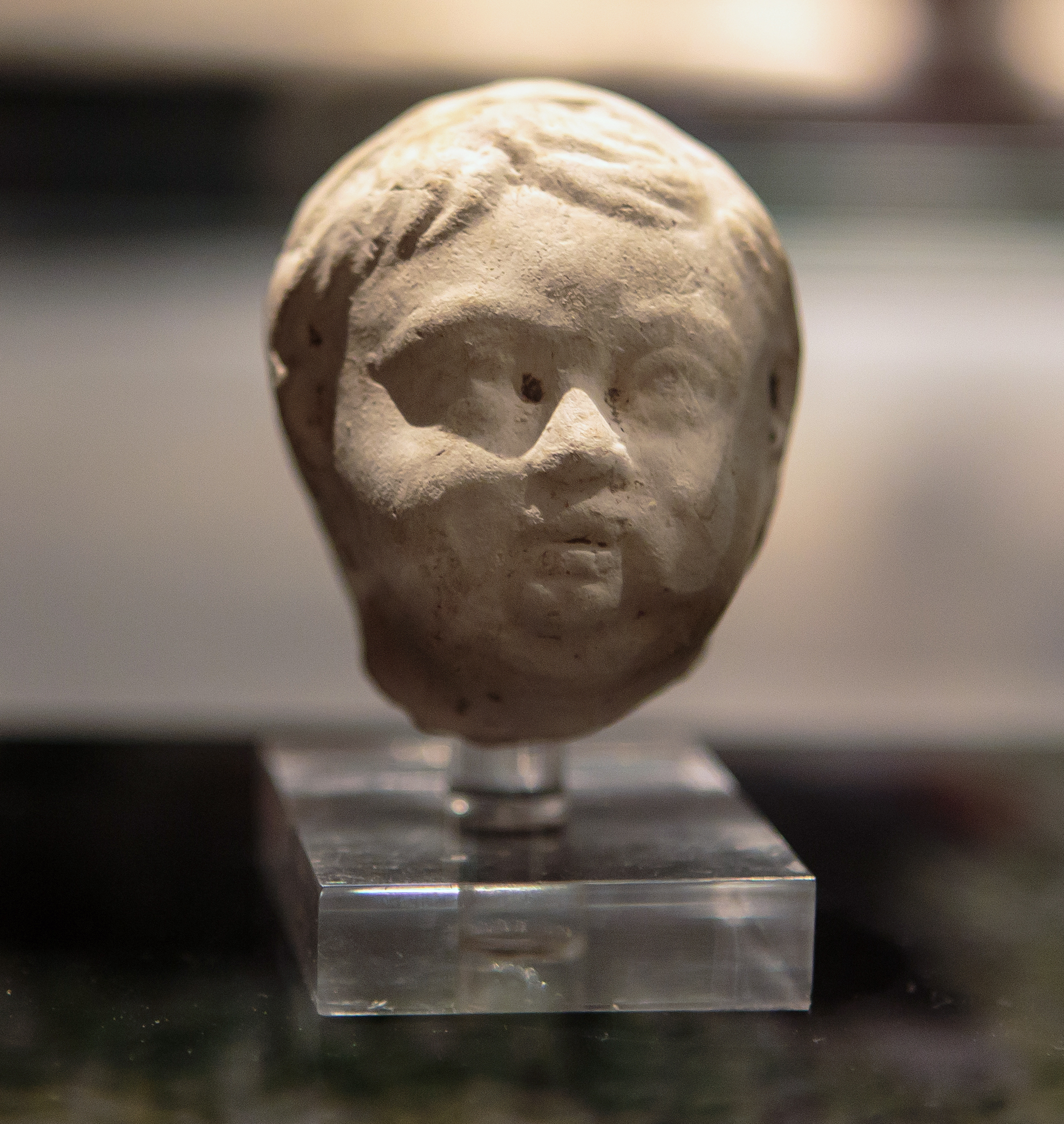
Roman ceramics, made of gypsum, found at civilian settlement

== Present-day features ==
The city of Alphen aan den Rijn has not forgotten its Roman history. A theatre and cinema – named Castellum – can be found where the camp used to be located, a stone with Roman inscriptions lies near the water on the Rijnplein, and a historical open-air museum named Archeon can be found in Alphen aan den Rijn. At the museum, the early history of the village has been recreated, including live experiencing Roman times through re-enactment. Outside town, along the N11 provincial road, a large iron statue of a Roman soldier can be seen.
