= Praetorium Agrippinae =

Former Roman fort in Netherlands

Coordinates: 52.1797°N 4.4317°E

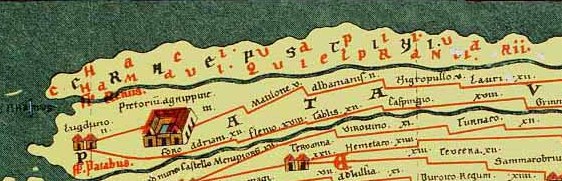
Pretoriu Agripinne depicted to the left on the Tabula Peutingeriana

Praetorium Agrippinae was a Roman settlement in the province of Lower Germania, in the area of the Cananefates, located in modern-day Valkenburg, Netherlands. It was an army encampment (Lat.: castellum) on the Old Rhine (at the time the major branch of the river Rhine), on the northern border of the Roman Empire, the limes. Praetorium Agrippinae is mentioned on the Tabula Peutingeriana between the castella of Matilo in the east and Lugdunum Batavorum to the west.

== History ==
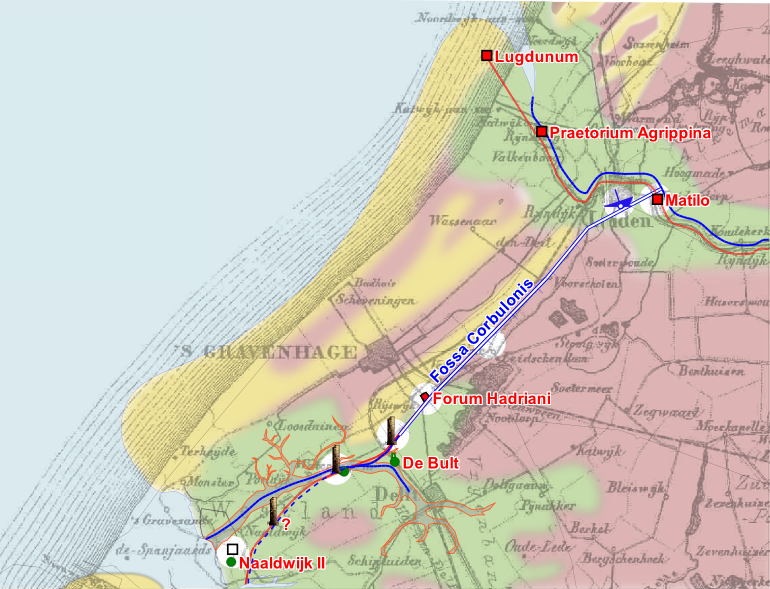
Palaeogeographic map of the Cananefatian area in the Roman period superimposed on South Holland today, showing the location of Praetorium Agrippinae.

=== Castellum ===
A praetorium is a military headquarters, and Praetorium Agrippinae takes its name from the mother of the emperor Caligula, Vipsania Agrippina, who died in 33 AD. It is almost certain that Caligula stayed in the area in 39 or 40 AD, since a wine barrel from his personal vineyards was found during excavations at Valkenburg. Most probably, he visited the area in preparation for a never executed invasion of Britannia, and the castellum may have been erected for this operation. However, finds of coins and terra sigillata pottery suggest that Roman army units may have been stationed there before its construction.

The fort was built in the current centre of Valkenburg, and was at first fortified by a palisaded earthen wall and three moats. Initially, two maniples (or four centuriae) of legionaries and two turmae of cavalry from the cohors III Gallorum Equitata were stationed at the fort. After the Revolt of the Batavi (69–70 AD), however, when the local tribes had razed the fortress to the ground, the entire cohors IV Thracum was relocated here. Around 180 AD the Romans enlarged the fort and rebuilt it in stone. In total, seven building phases have been distinguished.

Like all other forts on the Dutch limes, Valkenburg was deserted after the collapse of the Roman border defense around 275 AD. Valkenburg, however, is one of the few castella where evidence for Late Roman building activities was found. During the reign of Constantius I Chlorus a granary was constructed here for the shipment of grain to Britannia.

=== Vicus ===
To the southeast of the fortress, a large civil settlement (vicus) developed, stretching for approx. 1 km along the via militaris. It was inhabited between approx. 70 and 240 AD. Archaeological investigations have uncovered living quarters, storehouses and granaries, and possibly a bath house. A large cemetery containing over 700 graves was found as well. Between 70 and 110 AD, a small military encampment ("mini-castellum") was located here as well.

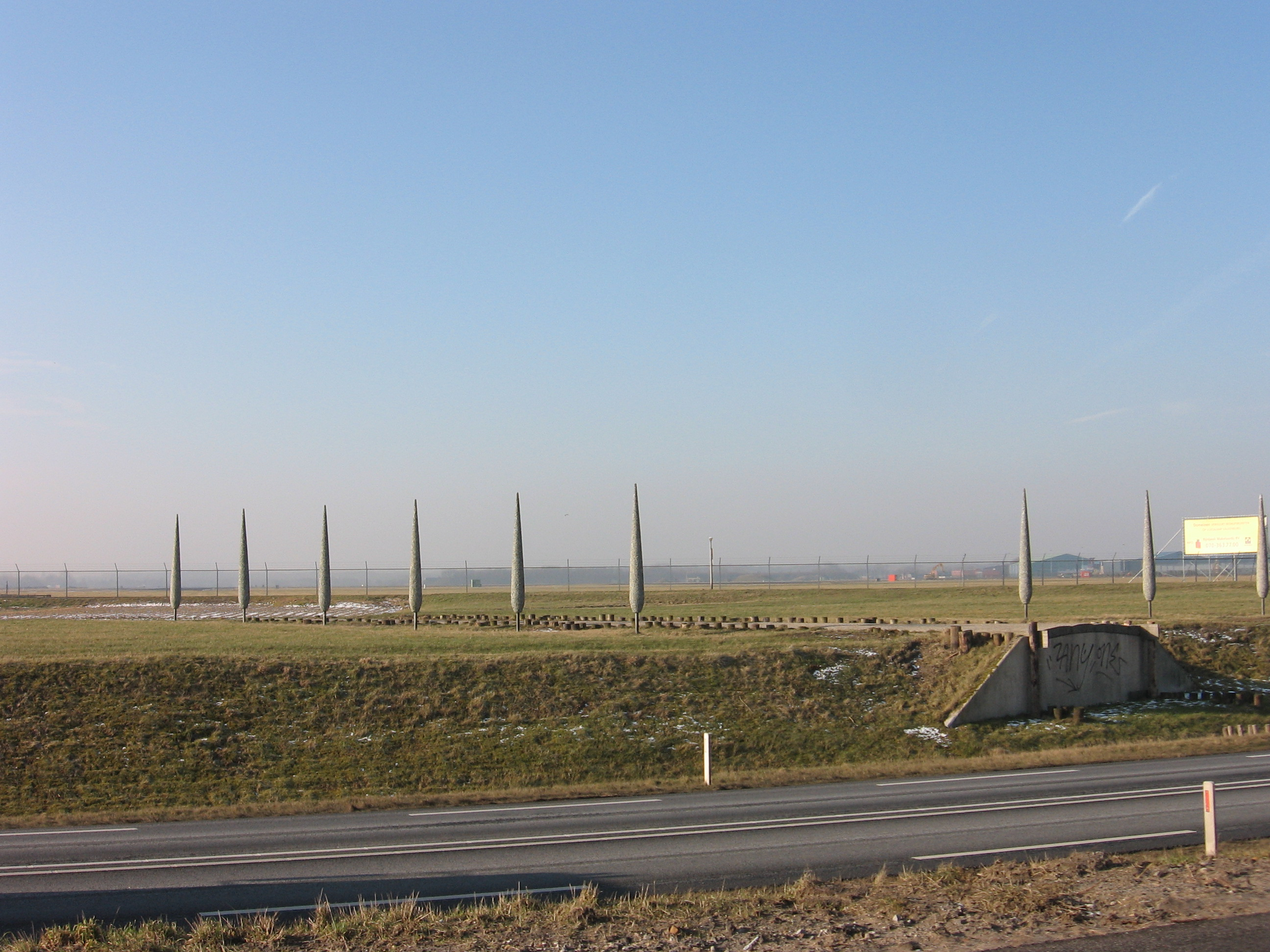
Reconstruction of the Roman road at Valkenburg

== Remains ==
Some of the finds can be seen in the Torenmuseum in Valkenburg. On the central square of town, the Castellumplein, the contours of the fort are visualised with bronze dots in the pavement. The foundations of one of the fort's gates have been reconstructed as well. Outside town, on the N206 provincial road, a reconstruction of the military road can be seen.

== Excavations ==
Valkenburg is one of the best excavated Roman sites in the Netherlands. Investigations started in 1875, but the main excavations were done between 1941 and 1953 under the direction of Albert Egges van Giffen. These excavations yielded large quantities of finds, and since the remains of the castellum were found below groundwater level, they were very well preserved and included many organic remains, such as foodstuffs, bone, leather and rope. This allowed for detailed reconstruction of Roman building practices and feeding habits.

In the 1970s and 1980s, further excavations were done in the area of the vicus. A recent re-analysis showed that the houses here were built in narrow rectangular parcels, perpendicular to the military road.
