= Fleur Kemmers =

Professor for Coinage and Money in the Graeco-Roman World

- Born: 1977 (age 48–49); Rhenen

Academic background
- Education: University of Amsterdam, Radboud University Nijmegen
- Thesis: Coins for a legion : an analysis of the coin finds of the Augustan legionary fortress and Flavian canabae legionis at Nijmegen (2005)

Academic work
- Discipline: Roman history
- Institutions: Goethe University Frankfurt

Fleur Kemmers (born 1977) is the Lichtenberg Professor for Coinage and Money in the Graeco-Roman World at Goethe University, Frankfurt.

== Education ==
Kemmers undertook her undergraduate degree in archaeology in 1996 at the University of Amsterdam, and following her MA moved to Radboud University Nijmegen in 2000 to work on her PhD. Kemmers' doctoral work focused on Roman coins found at the legionary fortress of Nijmegen, examining the use and supply of coins in the Lower Rhine region in the first century AD. Kemmers completed her PhD in 2005 and the work was published as Coins for a legion. An analysis of the coin finds from the Augustan legionary fortress and Flavian canabae legionis at Nijmegen in 2006.

== Career ==
During her PhD work at Radboud University Nijmegen, Kemmers worked as a Junior Researcher. In 2003, Kemmers also worked at the Royal Dutch Museum of Coins and Medals in Leiden, publishing coins from the auxiliary fort of Albaniana. Following her PhD, Kemmers continued to work at Radboud University Nijmegen as a postdoctoral researcher working on Roman coins in the Severan period military, and as a university lecturer from 2008 to 2009. In 2010, Kemmers joined the Classical Archaeology department at Goethe University Frankfurt as Lichtenberg Professor for Coinage and Money in the Graeco-Roman World, becoming a full professor in 2016.

In Frankfurt, Kemmers has continued to work on Roman coins, including an exhibition of coins in the collection of the University of Erlangen-Nuremberg in 2014.

Between 2016 and 2019 Kemmers directed a project Syria Antiqua: objects and their stories in numismatics to digitise the Graeco-Roman coins of Syria in the collection of the Staatliche Museen zu Berlin, examining circulation, provenance, and imagery.

In 2017 Kemmers presented research co-led with Dr Katrin Westner on the analysis of Roman silver coins proving a change in metal composition and the spread of silver from Spain following the defeat of Hannibal.

Kemmers has also appeared as a specialist on documentaries concerning Roman history and archaeology.

== Awards and honours ==
- 2005: Van-Es Prize for outstanding dissertation in Dutch Archaeology
- 2006: Quadrennial award of the Koninklijk Belgisch Genootschap voor Numismatiek
- 2007: X-ray Research Masterclass winner at the WISER (Women in Science, Education and Research) Festival, Maastricht

== Publications ==
- "Quadrantes from Nijmegen: small change in a frontier province" Schweizerische Numismatische Rundschau 82 (2003) pp. 17–35.
- "Caligula on the Lower Rhine: coin finds from the Roman fort of Albaniana (The Netherlands)" Revue Belge de Numismatique et de Sigillographie 150 (2004) pp. 15–49.
- "The Roman coin finds from the Augustan legionary fortress and Flavian canabae legionis at Nijmegen, The Netherlands" in Rahel C. Ackermann, Harald R. Derschka, Carol Mages (eds): Selbstwahrnehmung und Fremdwahrnehmung in der Fundmünzenbearbeitung. Bilanz und Perspektiven am Beginn des 21. Jahrhunderts. Band 1: Materialien. Tagungsunterlagen (= Untersuchungen zu Numismatik und Geldgeschichte. 6). Éditions de Zèbre, Lausanne (2005) ISBN 2-940351-04-X pp. 83–85.
- "Kleingeld aan de grens: Romeinse munten in Nijmegen" in Hans Bots, Jan Brabers, Paul M. M. Klep, Jan Kuys, Willem Willems, Corrie-Christine van der Woude (eds): Nijmegen. Geschiedenis van de oudste stad van Nederland. Band 1: Willem Willems, Harry van Enckevort, Jan Kees Haalebos, Jan Thijssen (eds): Prehistorie en Oudheid. Inmerc, Wormer (2005) ISBN 90-6611-230-1 pp. 226–229.
- "Coin circulation in the Lower Rhine area: Deliberate policy or laissez-faire?" in Corneliu Gaiu, Cristian Găzdac (eds): Fontes Historiae. Studia in honorem Demetrii Protase (= Biblioteca Muzeului Bistriţa. Seria Historica. 12). Bistriţa, Cluj-Napoca (2006) ISBN 973-8915-00-7 pp. 735–742.
- Coins for a legion. An analysis of the coin finds from the Augustan legionary fortress and Flavian canabae legionis at Nijmegen. Studien zu Fundmünzen der Antike 21 (Mainz, 2006).
- "A military presence on the Lower Rhine before Drusus’ campaigns: the coin finds of the Augustan legionary fortress at Nijmegen" in Gustav Adolf Lehmann, Rainer Wiegels (eds): Römische Präsenz und Herrschaft im Germanien der augusteischen Zeit. Der Fundplatz von Kalkriese im Kontext neuerer Forschungen und Ausgrabungsbefunde (= Abhandlungen der Akademie der Wissenschaften zu Göttingen. Philologisch-Historische Klasse. Folge 3, 279). Vandenhoeck & Ruprecht, Göttingen (2007) ISBN 978-3-525-82551-8 pp. 183–200.
- "Interaction or indifference? The Roman coin finds from the Lower Rhine delta" in Aleksander Bursche, Renata Ciolek, Reinhard Wolters (eds): Roman coins outside the empire. Ways and phases, contexts and functions (= Collection Moneta. 82). Moneta u. a., Wetteren (2008) ISBN 978-90-77297-49-0 pp. 93–103.
- "Marcus Agrippa and the earliest Roman fortress at Nijmegen: the coin finds from the Hunerberg" in María Paz García-Bellido, Antonio Mostalac, Alicia Jiménez (eds): Del imperivm de Pompeyo a la avctoritas de Augusto. Homenaje a Michael Grant (= Anejos de Archivo Español de Arqueología. 47). Consejo Superior de Investigaciones Científicas, Instituto de Historia, Madrid (2008) ISBN 978-84-00-08740-1 pp. 165–172.
- "From bronze to silver: Coin circulation in the early third century AD" in Revue Belge de Numismatique et de Sigillographie. Bd. 155 (2009) pp. 143–158.
- "De Romeinse muntvondsten van het terrein De Hoge Woerd in De Meern (gemeente Utrecht)" in Jaarboek voor Munt- en Penningkunde. Bd. 95,(2009) ISSN 0920-380X, pp. 1–64.
- "Sender or receiver? Contexts of coin supply and coin use" in Hans-Markus von Kaenel, Fleur Kemmers (eds): New perspectives for the interpretation of coin finds (= Coins in Context. 1 = Studien zu Fundmünzen der Antike. 23). von Zabern, Mainz (2009) ISBN 978-3-8053-4091-5 pp. 137–156.
- "Contexts and phases: suggestions for a new approach to Celtic coins in Roman forts" in Johan van Heesch, Inge Heeren (eds): Coinage in the Iron Age. Essays in honour of Simone Scheers. Spink, London (2009) ISBN 978-1-902040-97-4 pp. 271–278.
- "The use and supply of coins in Roman Nijmegen" in Willem J. H. Willems, Harry van Enckevort (eds): Vlpia Noviomagvs. Roman Nijmegen. The Batavian capital at the imperial frontier (= Journal of Roman Archaeology. Supplementary Series. 73). Journal of Roman Archaeology, Portsmouth RI (2009) ISBN 978-1-887829-73-1 pp. 153–156.
- (eds.) with Von Kaenel, H.-M. Coins in Context 1. New perspectives for the interpretation of coin finds. Studien zu Fundmünzen der Antike 23. (Mainz, 2009).
- (eds.) with M. Driessen, S. Heeren, J. Hendriks and R. Visser TRAC 2008. Proceedings of the 18th Theoretical Roman Archaeology Conference. (Oxford, 2009).
- "Worthless? The practice of depositing counterfeit coins in Roman votive contexts" in Nanouschka Myrberg Burström, Gitte Tarnow Ingvardson (eds) Divina Moneta: Coins in Religion and Ritual (Routledge, 2017)
- (eds.) with Th. Maurer, B. Rabe Lege Artis. Festschrift für Hans-Markus von Kaenel. Frankfurter Archäologische Schriften 25 (Bonn, 2015).
- The Functions and Use of Roman Coinage: An Overview of 21st Century Scholarship (Brill, 2019)
