= Oude Rijn (Utrecht and South Holland) =

Oude Rijn Old Rhine
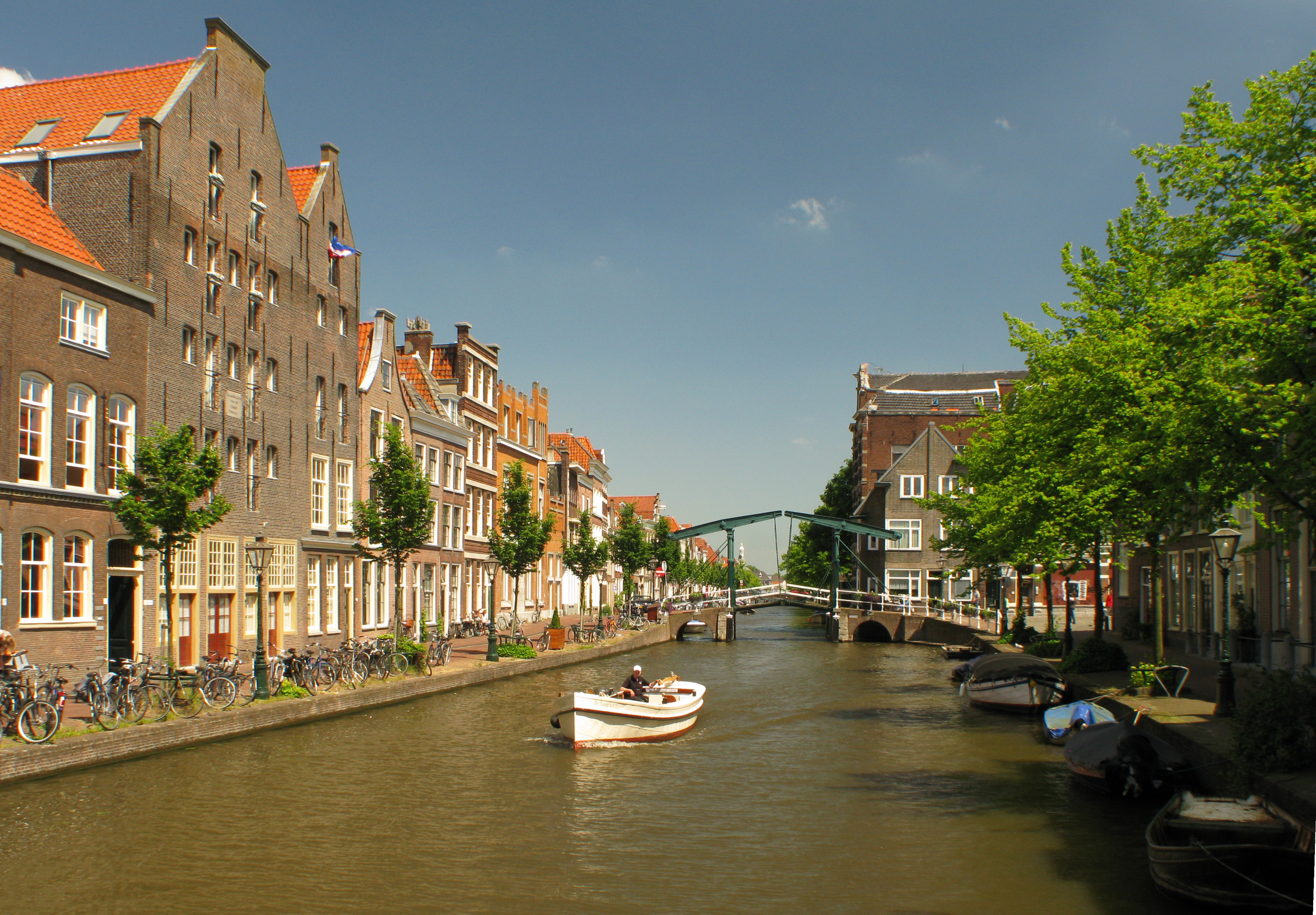
- The Oude Rijn in Leiden

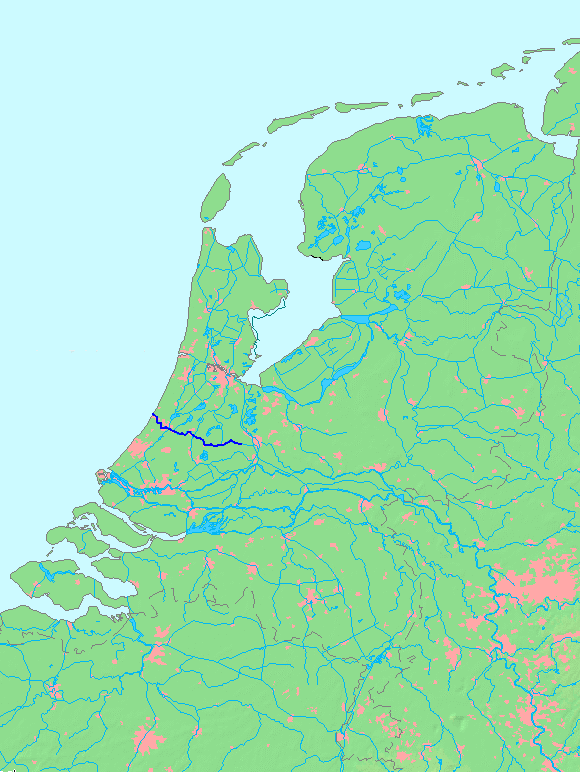
- Location of Oude Rijn in dark blue.

Location
- Country: Netherlands
- Region: Utrecht, South Holland

Physical characteristics
- Source: Leidse Rijn
  - location: Harmelen, Utrecht
  - coordinates: 52°05′31.5″N 4°57′48.5″E
- Mouth: North Sea
  - location: Katwijk, South Holland
  - coordinates: 52°12′43″N 4°23′54″E
- Length: 52 km (32 mi)

The Oude Rijn ("Old Rhine") is a branch of the Rhine delta in the Dutch provinces of Utrecht and South Holland, starting west of Utrecht, at Harmelen, and running by a mechanical pumping station into the North Sea at Katwijk. Its present-day length is 52 kilometres.

In ancient times, it was the lower part of the main River Rhine, which forked at the Betuwe into a northern branch, the Rhine, and a southern branch, the Waal. The Oude Rijn was then much wider than it is now, and tidal. During the Roman occupation, the river formed part of the northern border of the Empire. In medieval times, the River Lek became the main outlet for the Rhine, and the Oude Rijn silted up. The river was still important as a drain for the surrounding lowlands, for the clay industry, and as a transport and trade route. Ships were towed by horse and human power, using a towpath along large sections of the river, many parts of which have since been upgraded to roads or cycle paths.

== Description ==
The city of Utrecht was founded at a ford near the fork of the Kromme Rijn into the Vecht to the north and the Oude Rijn to the west. Of the original fork, little remains today, and both Vecht and Rijn start from the city moat. For the first few kilometres of its course, the river is channelised and known as the Leidse Rijn (Leiden Rhine). It becomes the Oude Rijn after the railway bridge near Harmelen (municipality Woerden). Then it flows westward through Woerden where first the Lange Linschoten branches off to the south and then the Oude Rijn forms part of the city moats.

After Woerden, the River Grecht branches off to the north and the Oude Rijn continues through the towns of Nieuwerbrug, Bodegraven, and Zwammerdam. Here the Meije stream empties into the Oude Rijn. In Alphen aan den Rijn, the Aar Canal joins the river and the Gouwe branches off to the south. It then flows through Koudekerk aan den Rijn and Hazerswoude-Rijndijk.

After Zoeterwoude-Rijndijk and Leiderdorp, where the short River Does ends, the Oude Rijn flows through Leiden. The Rhine-Schie Canal and the Zijl stream begin here. The Nieuwe Rijn ("New Rhine") is a short branch that, together with the Oude Rijn, forms part of Leiden's moat system; the two branches merge in the city's centre.

The stream Korte Vliet discharges into the Oude Rijn and it continues through Valkenburg and Rijnsburg to Katwijk. At Katwijk aan den Rijn the Oegstgeesterkanaal merges with the Oude Rijn. From here the river has been straightened into a canal (called the Uitwateringkanaal); it empties into the North Sea through a pumping station, preventing high tides inland and silting up of the river mouth.

== Water management & Waterworks ==
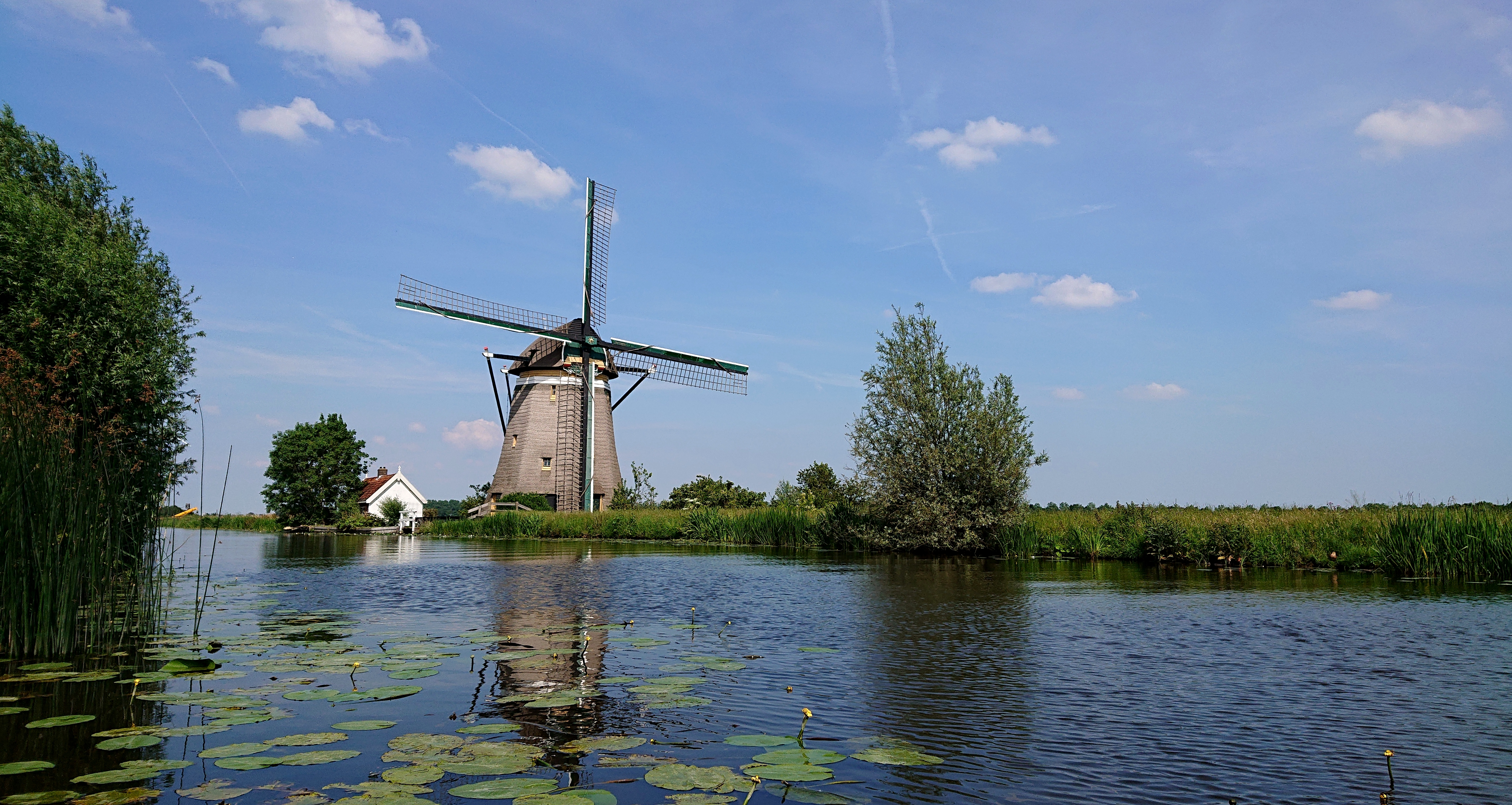
Windmill Zoeterwoude

Around 1000 CE the river silted up, causing floodings of the lowlands. As prevention, around 1100 CE a dam with locks was built at the village of Zwammerdam, upstream at the border to Utrecht, an area reigned by German Emperor Frederick Barbarossa. Continuing problems in water management in wide areas along Oude Rijn were reason for civilians with administrative responsibilities to collaborate and to establish a so-called High Water Authority or in Dutch Hoogheemraadschap, the first of its kind in The Netherlands. The organisation has been privileged in 1255 by Count William II of Holland and Zeeland as central coordinator of all waterworks in the area and later was given the name Hoogheemraadschap van Rijnland. Early works were the building of draining canals around the city of Leiden. From 1408 on, with the first at Zoeterwoude, wind-powered pumps were installed along the Old Rhine, to pump water from the lowlands into the river.

The river silted up in the course of the Middle Ages and became much smaller. In 1572 near the North Sea the Water Authority had a canal built through the dunes to allow the Rhine water to flow into the sea, but due to war circumstances, it did silt. In 1807, a large water management system with locks was established to allow the water to flow out at low tide. In 1880 a steam driven mechanical pumping station was built.

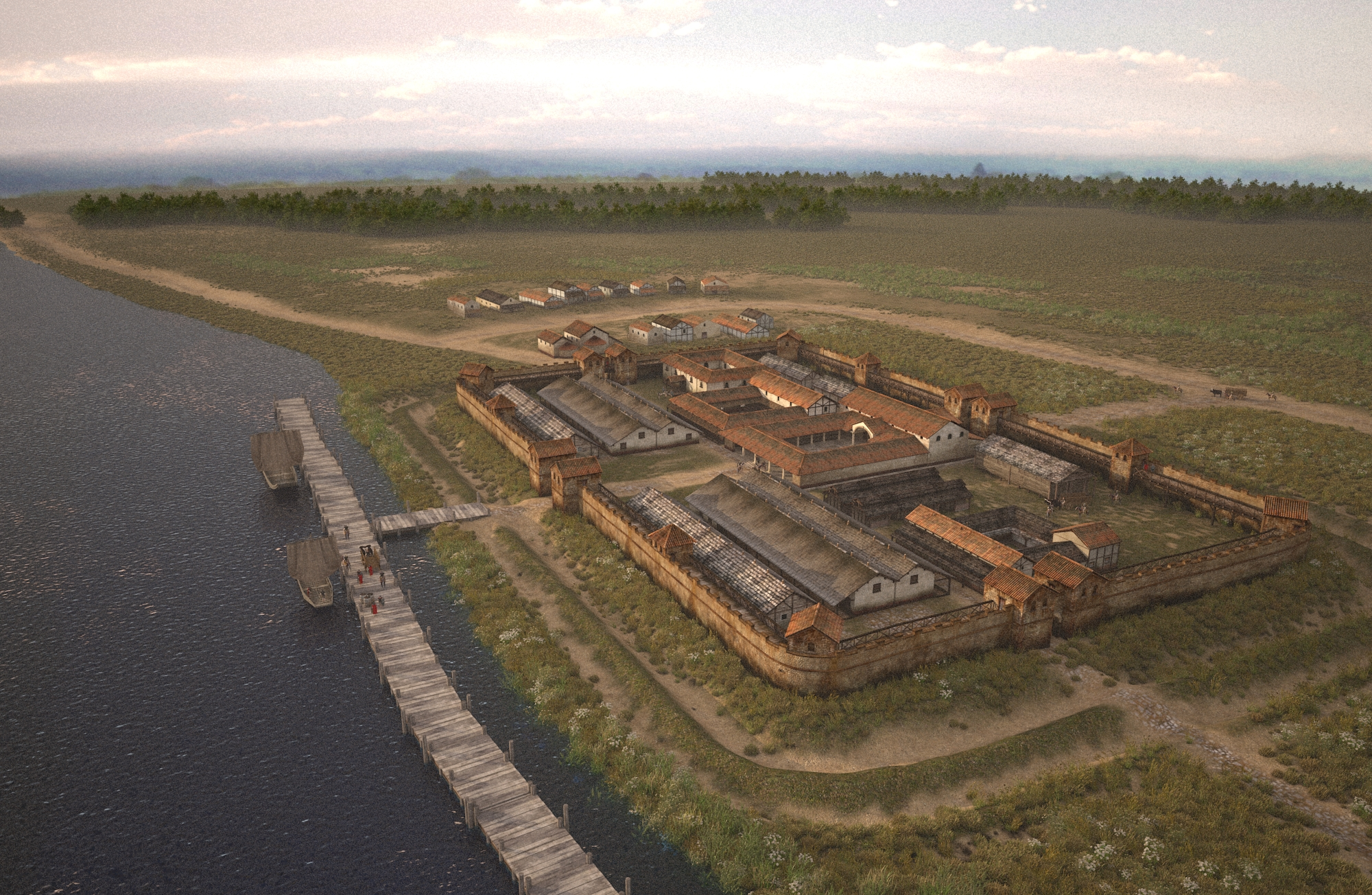
Castellum Nigrum Pullum (Zwammerdam) at Rhine river, artist impression Stevie Xinas

== History ==
=== Roman era ===
In Roman times, the river Oude Rijn formed part of the Roman Empire's northern border (Limes Germanicus). At strategic locations the Romans built guarding-towers and border-guarding castella and castra, including: Laurum (Woerden), Nigrum Pullum (Zwammerdam), Albaniana (Alphen aan den Rijn), Matilo (Leiderdorp), Praetorium Agrippinae (Valkenburg), and Lugdunum Batavorum (Katwijk). Many of the at that time unpopulated locations, evolved into cities and villages.

In Valkenburg, the layout of the Roman castellum has been marked in the pavement. At Woerden and Zwammerdam, Roman ships have been excavated.

== Visuals ==
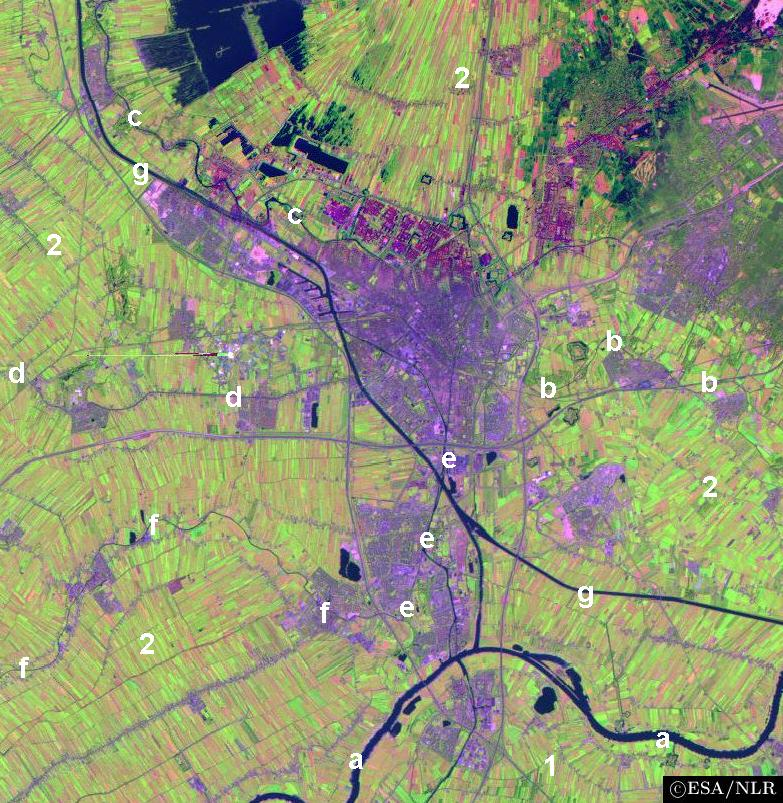
Satellite close-up of the Utrecht region showing the Leidse Rijn-Oude Rijn stream (d).

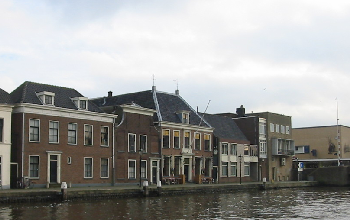
Houses on the Oude Rijn near Alphen aan den Rijn

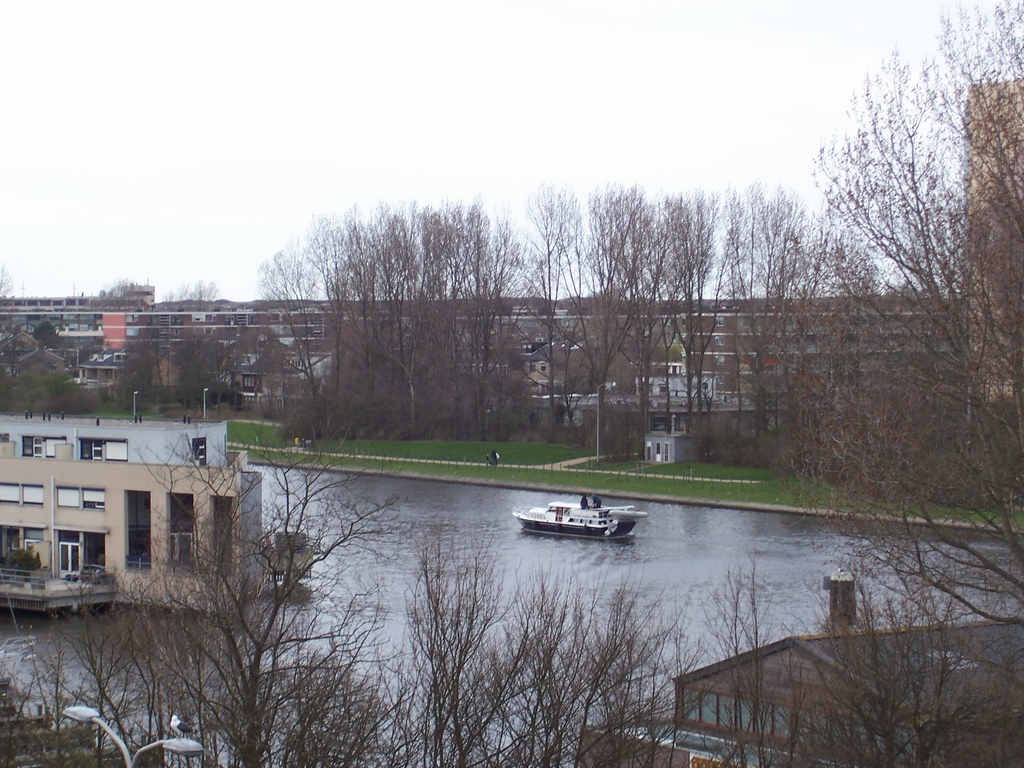
Oude Rijn, Katwijk, a half mile before it ends: (A Pumping station to pump water into sea preventing high water levels inland.)

== See also ==
- Zijl
