= Valkenburg, South Holland =

Place in South Holland, Netherlands

Valkenburg
- Village
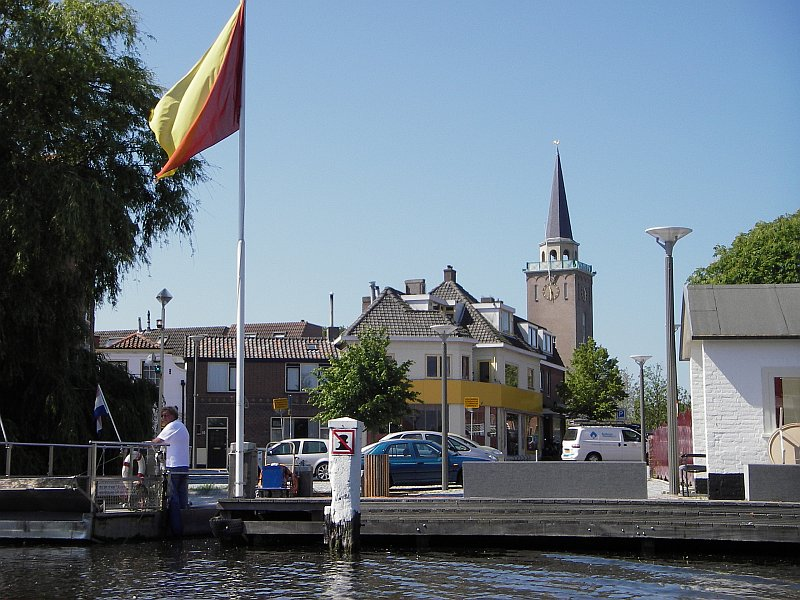
- Valkenburg from the Oude Rijn

- Flag Coat of arms

- Location in the province of South Holland in the Netherlands Location in the Netherlands
- Coordinates: 52.1792°N 4.4368°E
- Country: Netherlands
- Province: South Holland
- Municipality: Katwijk

Area
  - Total: 5.76 km^{2} (2.22 sq mi)
- Elevation: 0.6 m (2.0 ft)

Population (2021)
  - Total: 6,275
  - Density: 1,090/km^{2} (2,820/sq mi)
- Time zone: UTC+1 (CET)
  - Summer (DST): UTC+2 (CEST)
- Postal code: 2235
- Dialing code: 071

Valkenburg (Dutch pronunciation: [ˈvɑlkə(m)bʏr(ə)x]) is a village and former municipality in the province of South Holland, in the western Netherlands. Valkenburg is now part of the municipality Katwijk and had a population of 3,900 in 2006.

On 1 January 2006, Valkenburg and Rijnsburg were merged into the municipality of Katwijk. The former municipality of Valkenburg had about 3878 inhabitants (1 June 2005) and a surface area of 15.74 km^{2} (6.08 sq mi) of which 0.23 km^{2} (0.09 sq mi) is water.

On the second Wednesday in September there is a horse market, the oldest in the Netherlands. The market origins are believed to be around the year 840, and a painting princes Maurits and Frederik Hendrik visiting the market in the 17th century hangs in the 'Rijksmuseum' in Amsterdam.

The former Valkenburg Naval Air Base, which was situated here since 1936, was closed in 2006.

== Notable people ==
- Frédéric-Louis Allamand (1736–1809), Swiss botanist, died in Valkenburg

== See also ==
- Stoomtrein Valkenburgse Meer
- Praetorium Agrippinae a former Roman encampment at this location
