= Castellum =

Small tower or aqueduct tank in ancient Rome

Castellum

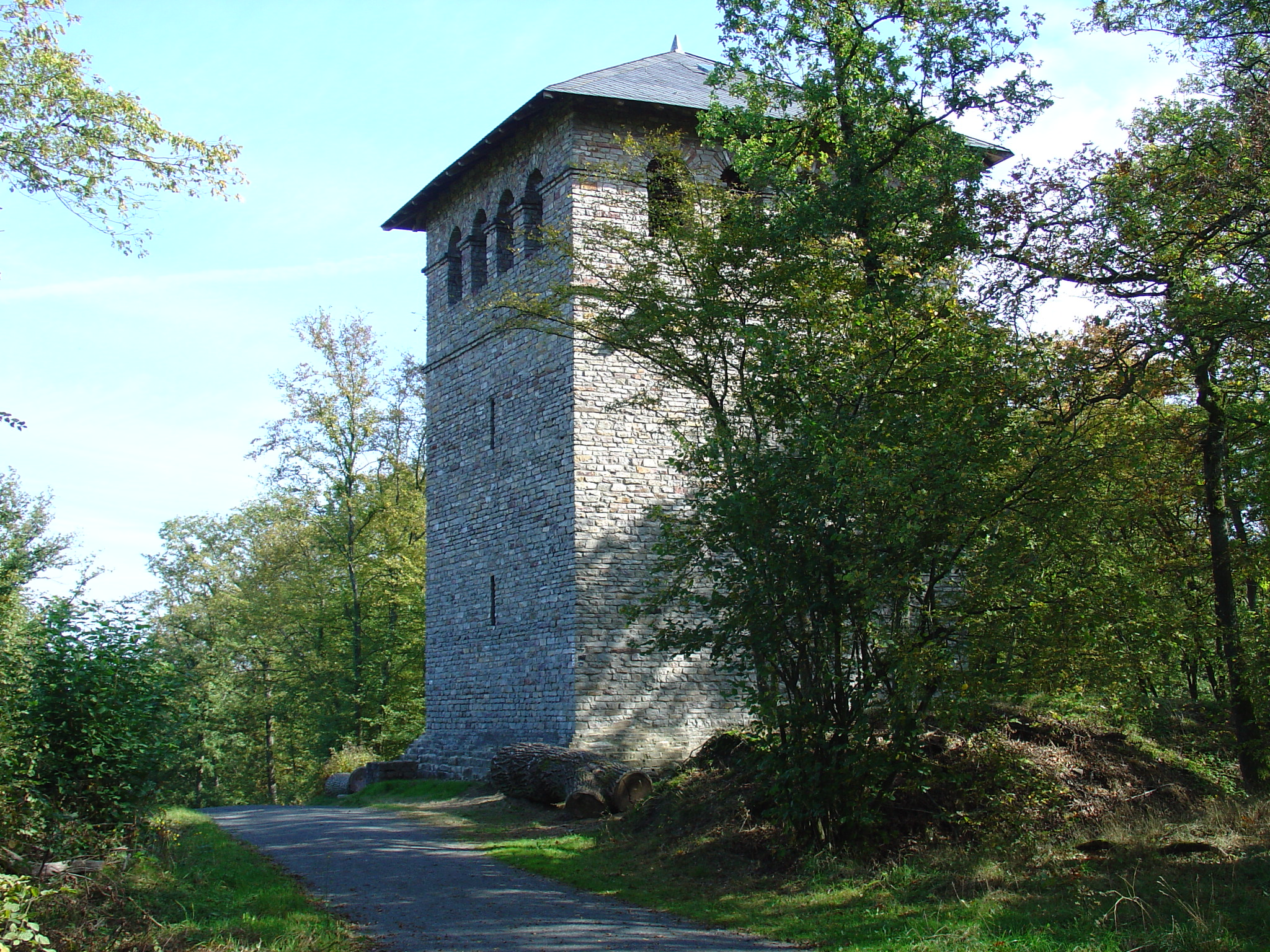
1. Limes watchtower, Germany (reconstruction)

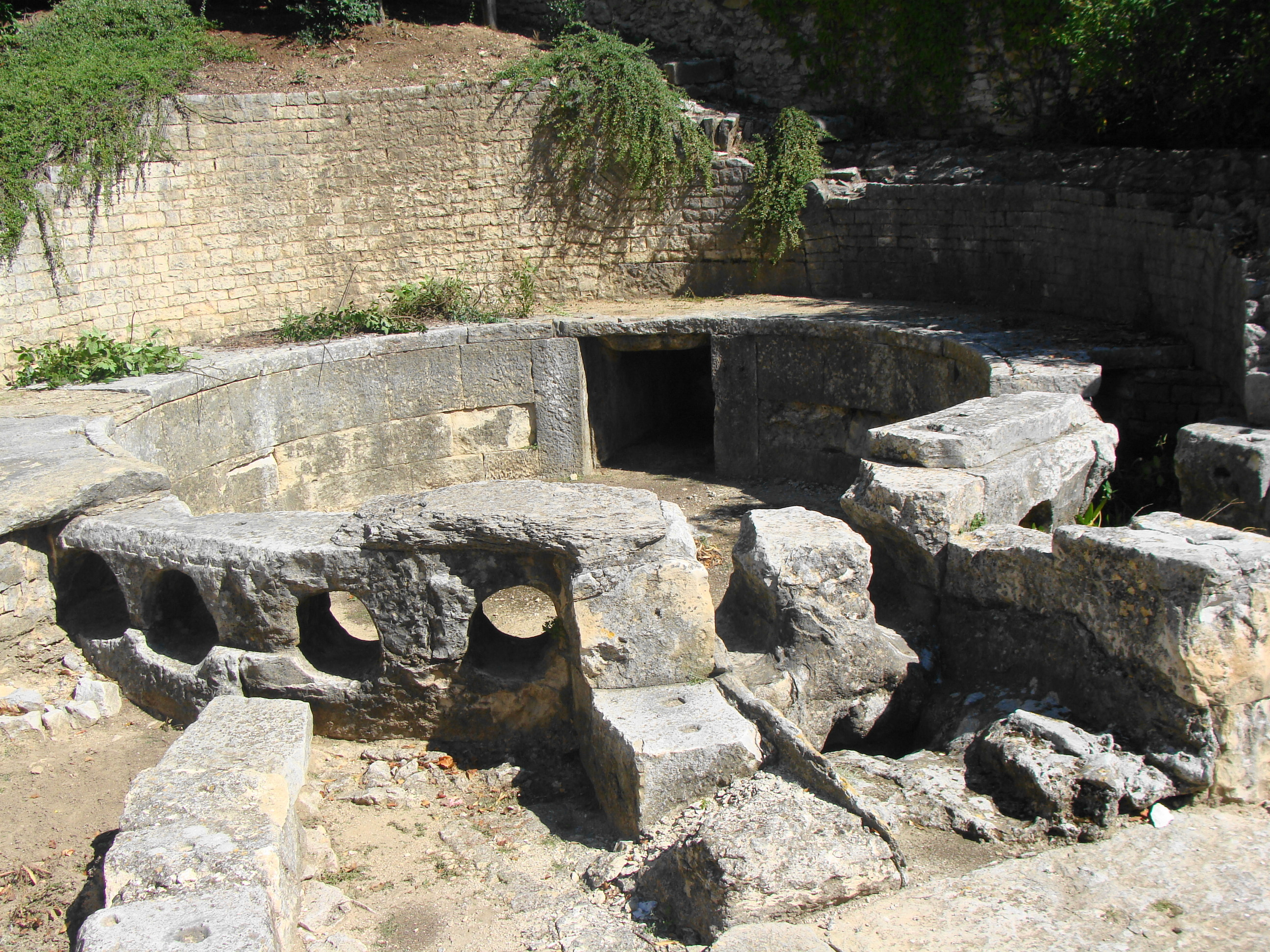
2. Ruins of a castellum divisorium, France

A castellum in Latin is usually:

- a small Roman fortlet or tower, a diminutive of castrum ('military camp'), often used as a watchtower or signal station like on Hadrian's Wall. It is distinct from a burgus, which is a later Latin term that was used particularly in the Germanic provinces.
- a distribution, header, and settling tank for municipal water in a Roman aqueduct (known as a castellum aquae/castellum divisorium).

It is the source of the English word "castle".
