= Feel Good Radio =

- Pijnacker; Netherlands
- Broadcast area: Haaglanden
- Frequencies: FM Ether: 107.6 MHz (Nootdorp); 105.6 MHz (Pijnacker); 105.9 MHz (Rijswijk)

Programming
- Language: Dutch

History
- First air date: 2007

Links
- Webcast: Watch Live; Listen Live
- Website: Feel Good Radio; Feel Good Radio 60’s & 70’s

Feel Good Radio is a Dutch radio station that plays classic hits from the 60s till the '00s.

The station first started out as a station serving the cities of Brecht and Essen, near the Dutch border in Belgium. The station ended operations a year later. It would later resume broadcasts in December 2014 with a transmitter in the city of Pijnacker-Nootdorp and later expand their over the air coverage in 2015 with a transmitter in Rijswijk. The station can currently be heard in the Haaglanden area near The Hague.

Not to be mistaken with a new internet radio station based in Devon The Feelgood Station.uk
