= Theo Lalleman =

Dutch writer, publicist, video artist and cultural entrepreneur

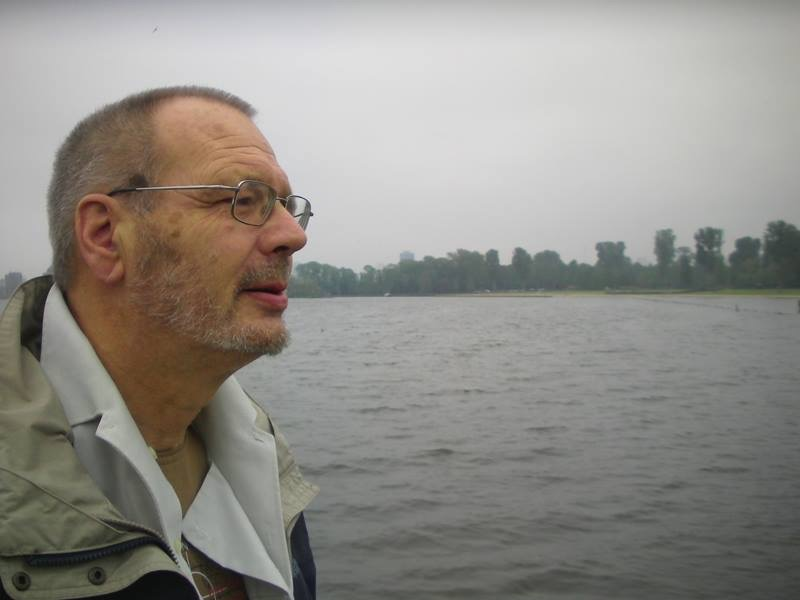
Theo Lalleman, 2010

Theo Lalleman (25 July 1946 – 26 December 2013) was a Dutch writer, publisher, video-artist, and cultural entrepreneur, known from his many cultural initiatives.

Lalleman was born in Pijnacker, and attended the Christelijk Lyceum in Delft, where he graduated in the class of 1963. In 1986 he co-founded the cultural magazine in Rotterdam called the De Nieuwe Weelde, in which he started publishing a translation of Finnegans Wake, written under the pseudonym Leon E. Thalma.

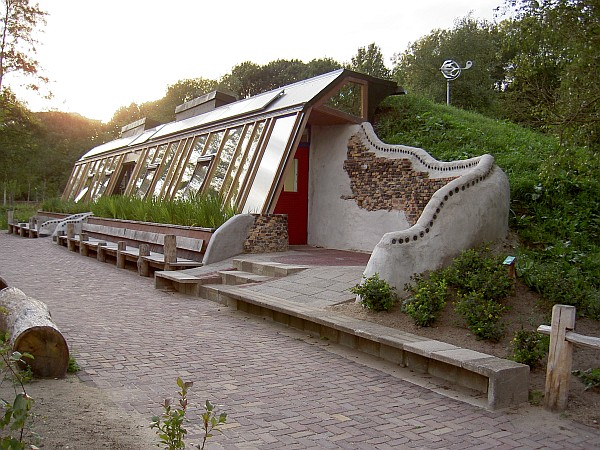
Earthship Zwolle.

In 2000 he co-founded the OWAZE Foundation, which develops projects in the field of autarkic building. One of its projects was the initiative and realization of an Earthship by Mike Reynolds in the Dutch city of Zwolle in 2009.

Lalleman died in Rotterdam, aged 67.

== Selected publications ==
- 1986. Tijdloze momenten. by Leon E. Thalma. Eburon, 1986
- 1990. De Heijplaat blijft. Eburon, 1990
- 2004. Earthships: achtergronden over de bouw van autonome gebouwen uit afvalmateriaal. With Michiel Haas. NIBE Publishing, 2004
