= Nieuweveen =

Nieuweveen is a former municipality in the Dutch province of South Holland. It was located northwest of Nootdorp. It included the Nieuweveenpolder and the Oost Negentig Morgen polder. The municipality contained one hamlet, also called Nieuweveen, located around the Veenweg road; the Roman Catholic Church of Nootdorp was located in Nieuwveen.

The municipality existed between 1817 and 1833, when it became part of Nootdorp. According to the 19th-century historian A.J. van der Aa, the area had about 120 inhabitants around 1850.
