= Nootdorp =

- Town
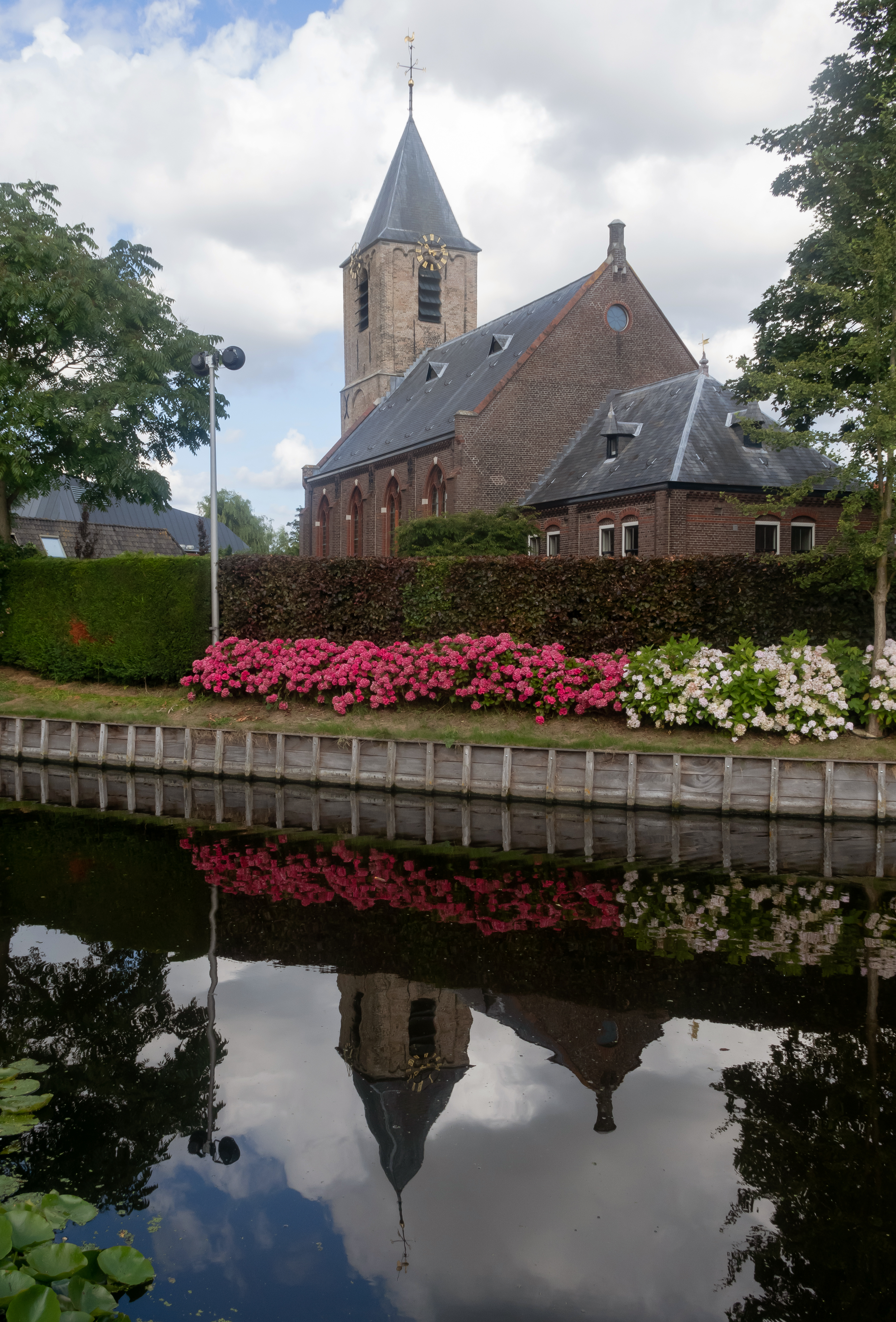
- The Dorpskerk (lit. "village church") on the Dorpsstraat (lit. "village street"), the historic centre of Nootdorp.

- Flag Coat of arms
- Interactive map of Nootdorp
- Coordinates: 52°2′28″N 4°23′52″E
- Country: Netherlands
- Province: South Holland
- Municipality: Pijnacker-Nootdorp

Area
  - Total: 7.60 km^{2} (2.93 sq mi)
  - Land: 7.12 km^{2} (2.75 sq mi)
  - Water: 0.48 km^{2} (0.19 sq mi)

Population (1 January 2023)
  - Total: 19,020
  - Density: 2,670/km^{2} (6,920/sq mi)

Nootdorp (Dutch pronunciation: [ˈnoːdɔr(ə)p]) is a small town in the Dutch province of South Holland. It is bordered by Zoetermeer to the north, by The Hague (specifically Leidschenveen-Ypenburg) to the west, by Delfgauw to the south and by Pijnacker to the east. Nootdorp was a separate municipality until 2002, when it merged with Pijnacker to form Pijnacker-Nootdorp, which is a part of Greater The Hague.

Nootdorp is serviced by the Nootdorp RandstadRail station, which Line E runs through, a Rotterdam Metro line connecting The Hague and Rotterdam.

== History ==
Nootdorp has its roots in the 13th century, it was first mentioned in 1281 as a "safe road" located at what is now known as the Veenweg.

== Neighbourhoods ==
- Oostambacht / Heronpark
- De Venen Oost
- Vrouwtjeslant / Nieuweveen
- De Venen Centrum
- 's-Gravenhout
- Nootdorp Centrum/West
- Achter het Raadhuis
- Buitengebied Nootdorp
- De Venen / Craeyenburch

== Gallery ==
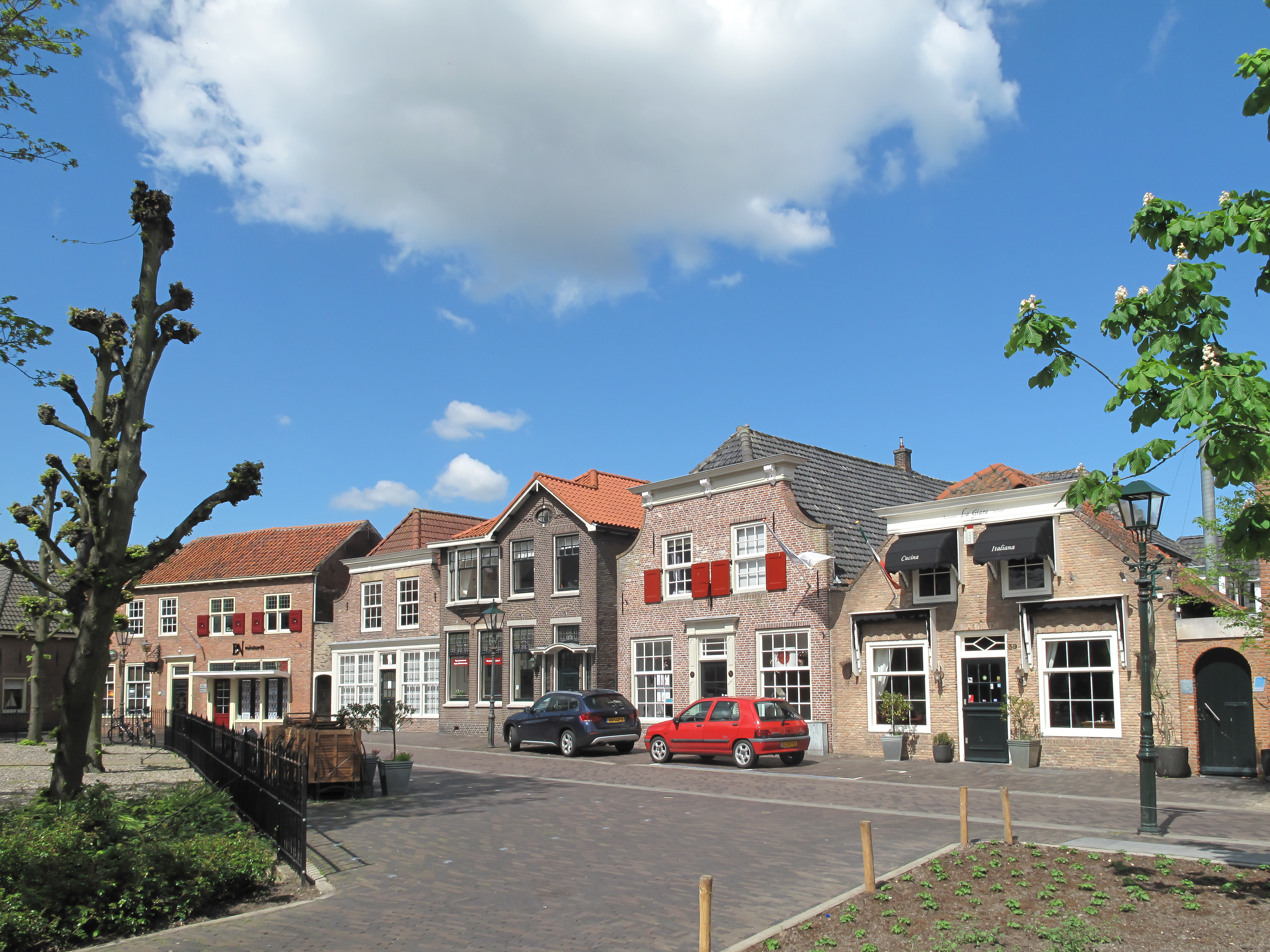
Nootdorp, view to a street: de Dorpsstraat

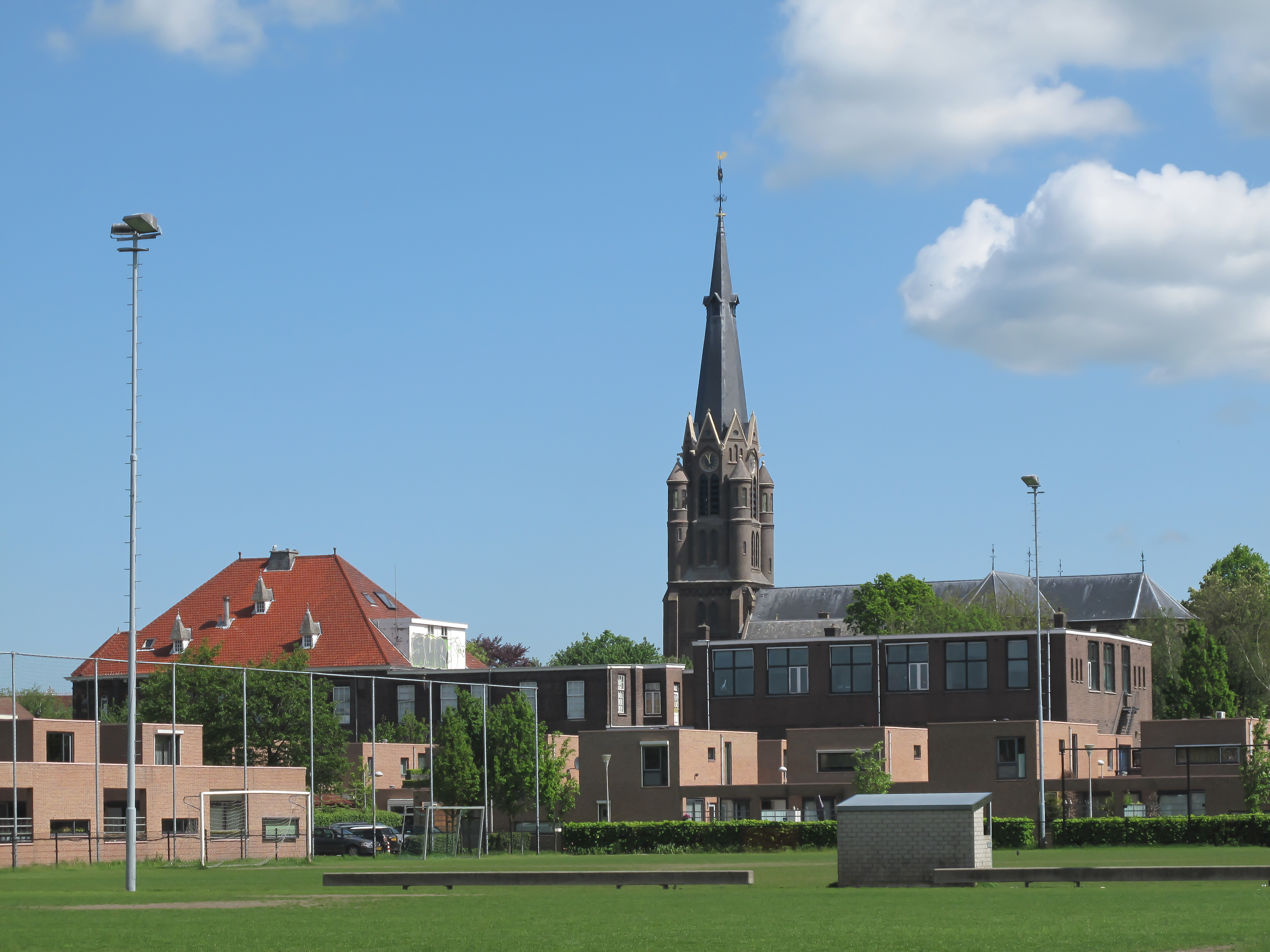
Nootdorp, church: de Sint Bartolomeüskerk

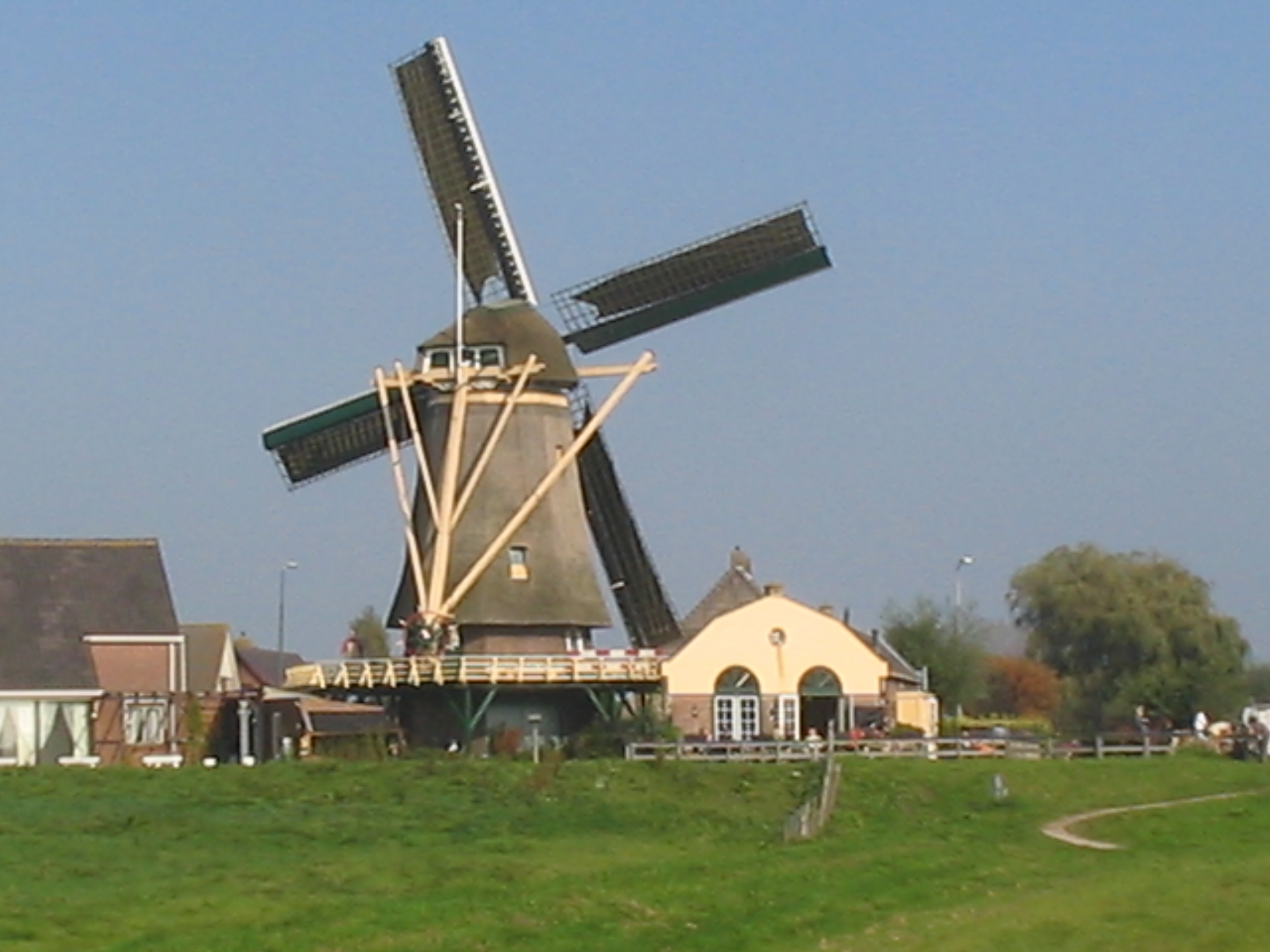
Nootdorp, windmill Windlust

== Sport ==
After the formation of the Netherlands national rugby league team, the town formed a rugby league club called the Nootdorp Panthers. They are the first domestic rugby league club in the country that play in the Dutch Rugby League Competition. There is an active cricket playing community, with former Dutch international, Tim de Leede, owning a sports shop in the area that also sells cricket equipment.

Nootdorp has two football clubs, RKDEO and SV Nootdorp.

== See also ==
- Nieuweveen
