= Van Ruijven =

Van Ruijven is a Dutch toponymic surname meaning "from Ruiven" (former municipality in South Holland). Notable people with the surname include:

- Lara van Ruijven (1992–2020), Dutch short track speed skater
- Pieter van Ruijven (1624–1674), Dutch art collector
