= Ruiven =

Coordinates: 51°59′43″N 4°23′55″E

Ruiven is a former municipality in the Dutch province of South Holland. It was located about 4 km southeast of the city of Delft.

Ruiven was a separate municipality between 1817 and 1846, when it became part of Pijnacker.
