= Pijnacker =

Town in South Holland, Netherlands

- Town
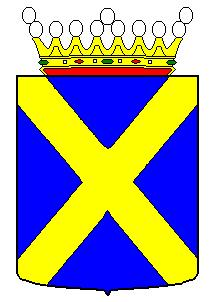
- Coat of arms

- Location within South Holland
- Coordinates: 52°1′6″N 4°26′10″E
- Country: Netherlands
- Province: South Holland
- Municipality: Pijnacker-Nootdorp

Population (1 January 2020)
  - Total: 27,130
- Website: Pijnacker-Nootdorp.nl

Pijnacker (Dutch pronunciation: [ˈpɛinɑkər]) is a town in the Dutch province of South Holland. It is bordered by Zoetermeer to the north, by Nootdorp to the northwest, by Delfgauw to the southwest, by Rotterdam (specifically Overschie) to the south and by Berkel en Rodenrijs to the east.

Pijnacker was a separate municipality until 2002, when it merged with Nootdorp to form Pijnacker-Nootdorp, which is a part of Greater The Hague. However, Pijnacker does not border The Hague (Nootdorp does), and it does border Rotterdam especially since Nootdorp and Pijnacker, while technically contiguous, have about 2 km of nature between them. While it may then seem strange that the two towns would want to merge, they did so preemptively to avoid potential annexing by the cities.

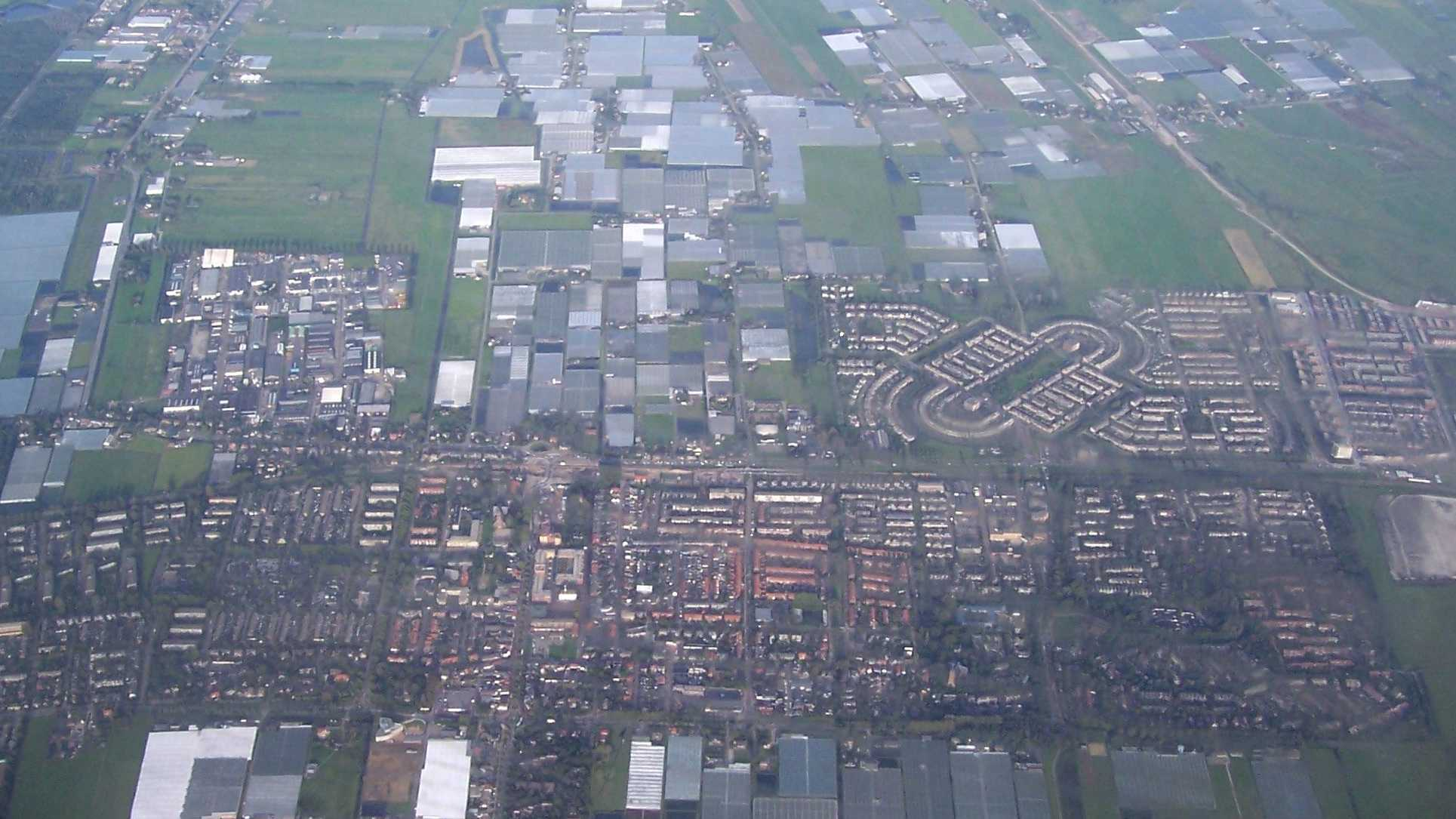
Pijnacker

Pijnacker has two stops on the Randstadrail E-lijn between The Hague and Rotterdam: Pijnacker Centrum and Pijnacker-Zuid.

In and around Pijnacker there are big nature areas, of which one is the Ackerdijkse Plassen, one of many bird areas in the Netherlands.

== Boroughs ==
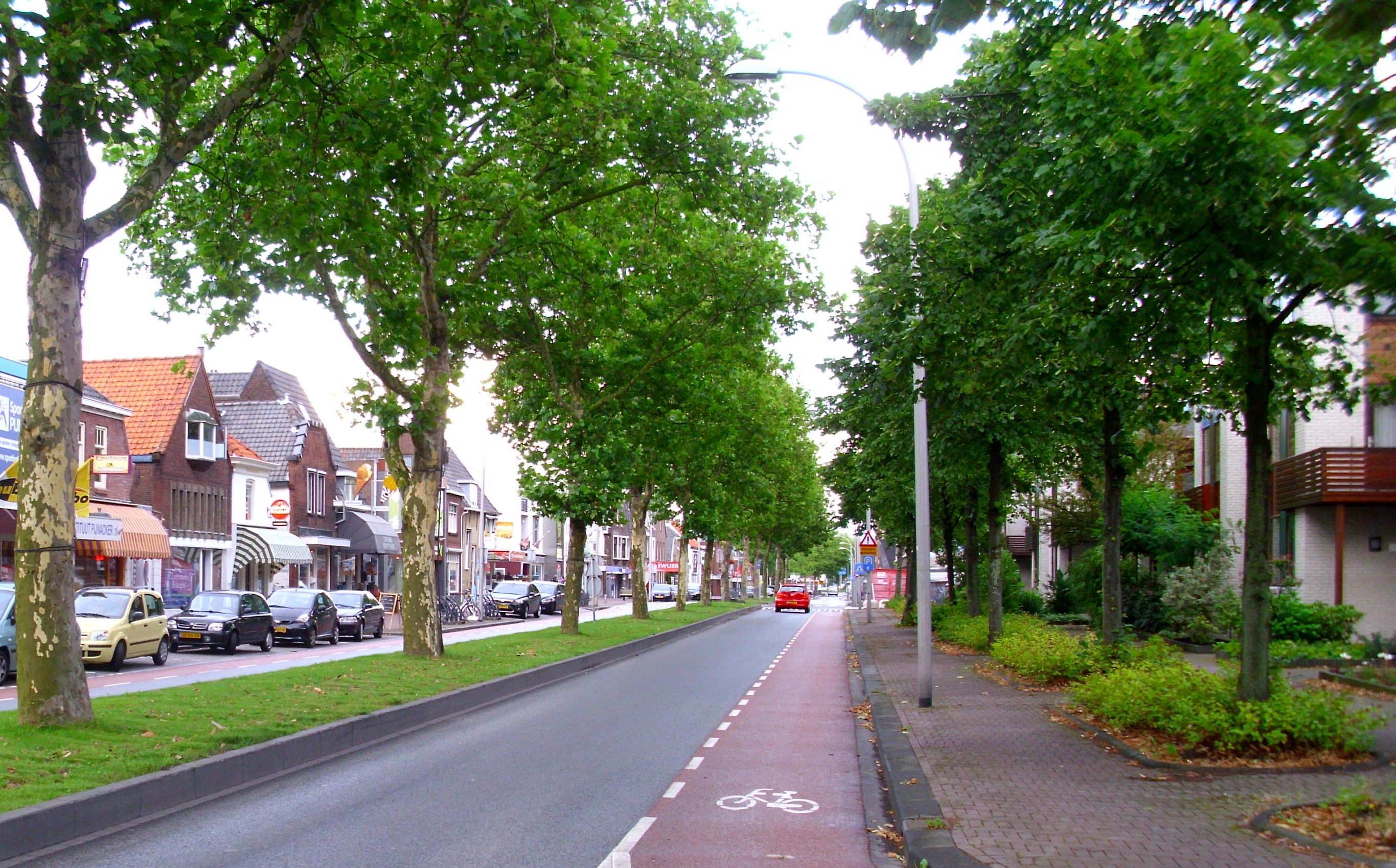
A street (oostlaan) in Pijnacker

- Centrum (Centre)
- Koningshof
- Noord (North)
- Klapwijk
- Tolhek
- Keijzershof
- Ackerswoude (partly build, not completed yet)
- Tuindershof (Hasn't been built yet)

== Significant structures ==
One of the dominant buildings in Pijnacker is H. Joannes de Dooper Catholic church on the main street of town, the Oostlaan. It is registered landmark, number 525173. Though once it was a parish with a full-time priest, the Church of Saint John the Baptist (Pijnacker) is now joined with the Church of Saint Bartholomew (Nootdorp) to form one parish within the "Parish Federation of Oostland" within the Roman Catholic Diocese of Rotterdam.

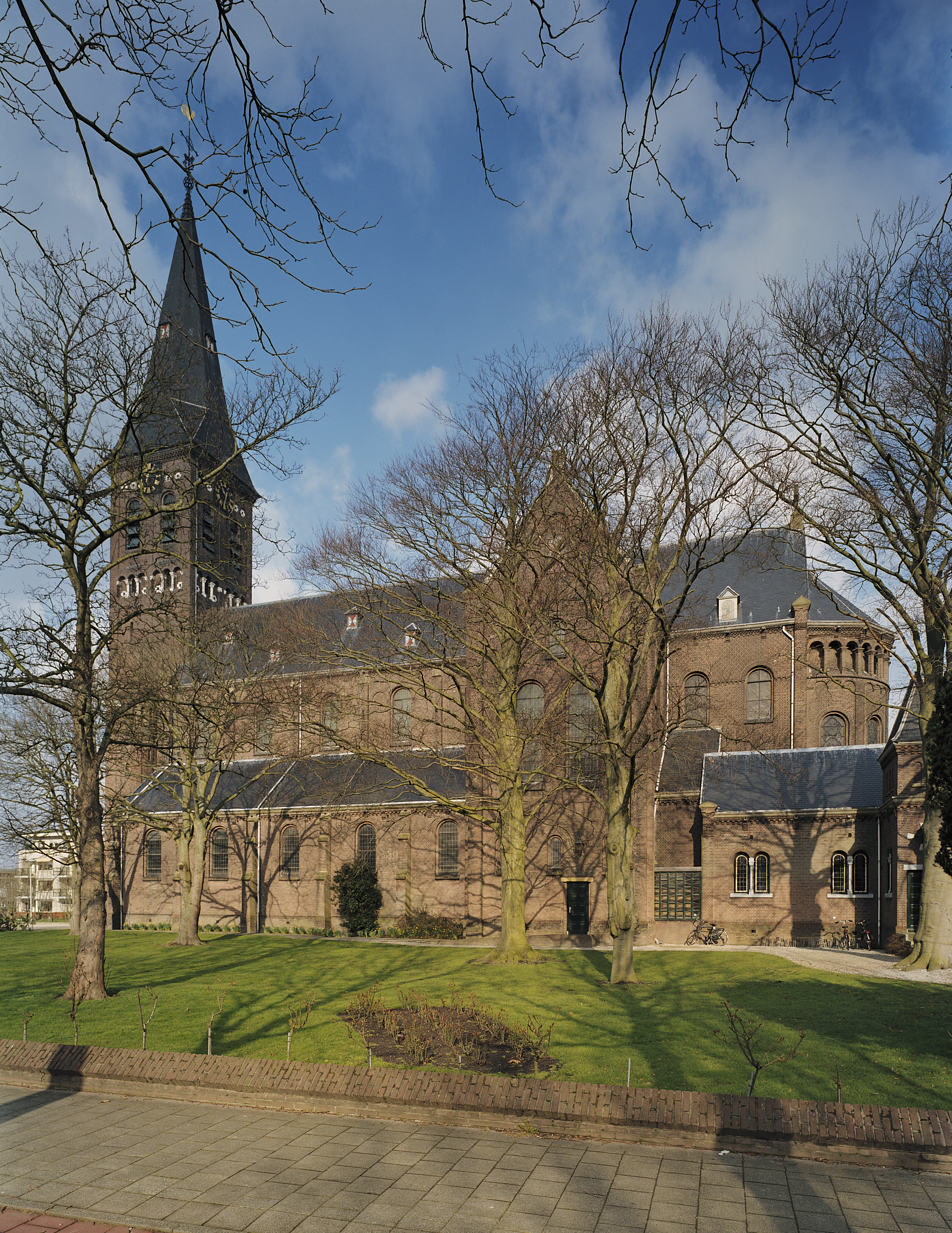
View of south side of Saint John the Baptist Catholic Church on the Oostlaan

== Notable residents ==
- Mabel Wisse Smit
- Demi Vollering
- Kurt Wubben

== See also ==
- Ruiven
