= Rijnstreek =

Region in South Holland, Netherlands

The Rijnstreek (literally nicknamed the "Rhine Region") is a small region in the province of South Holland in the Netherlands. It includes the municipalities of Alphen aan den Rijn (situated on the Oude Rijn, a tributary of the Rhine) (incl. Rijnwoude) and Nieuwkoop, and also the former municipality of Jacobswoude.
