= Pijnacker-Nootdorp =

- Municipality
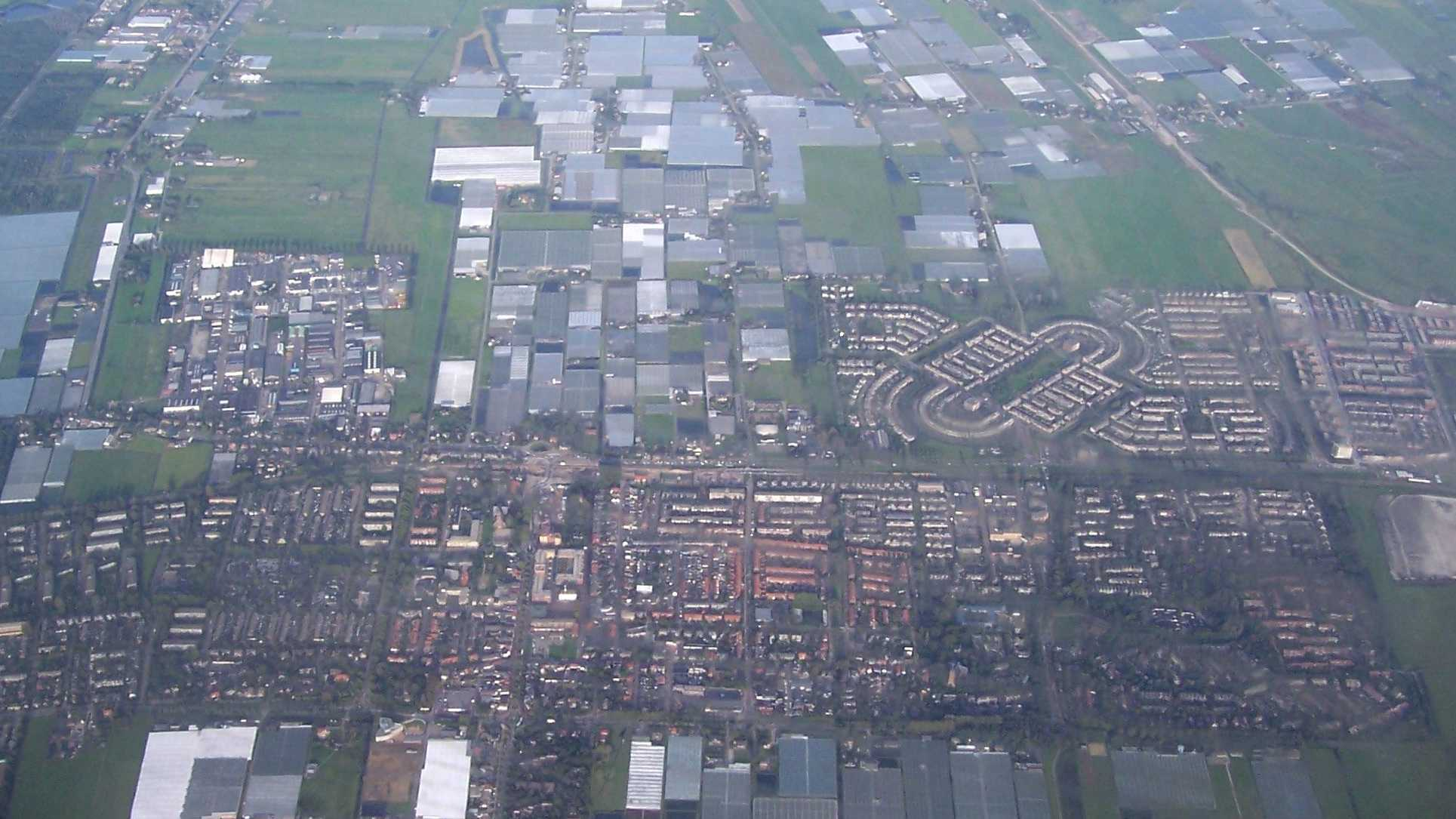
- Aerial view of Pijnacker

- Flag Coat of arms

- Location in South Holland
- Coordinates: 52°1′N 4°26′E
- Country: Netherlands
- Province: South Holland
- Established: 1 January 2002

Government
  - Body: Municipal council
  - Mayor: Francisca Ravestein (D66)

Area
  - Total: 38.62 km^{2} (14.91 sq mi)
  - Land: 37.08 km^{2} (14.32 sq mi)
  - Water: 1.54 km^{2} (0.59 sq mi)
- Elevation: −2 m (−6.6 ft)

Population (January 2021)
  - Total: 55,674
  - Density: 1,501/km^{2} (3,890/sq mi)
- Time zone: UTC+1 (CET)
  - Summer (DST): UTC+2 (CEST)
- Postcode: 2630–2632, 2640–2645
- Area code: 015
- Website: www.pijnacker-nootdorp.nl

Pijnacker-Nootdorp (Dutch pronunciation: [ˈpɛinɑkər ˈnoːdɔr(ə)p]) is a municipality in the Randstad conurbation in the Netherlands, in the province of South Holland. The municipality covers an area of 38.62 km^{2} (14.91 sq mi) of which 1.54 km^{2} (0.59 sq mi) is water.

The municipality of Pijnacker-Nootdorp comprises three settlements: Delfgauw, Nootdorp and Pijnacker. It also contains seven historical hamlets (one of which is partially in Delft), which all fall under one or more of the settlements for all intents and purposes. It is the result of merging the municipalities of Pijnacker and Nootdorp in 2002, with parts being annexed by neighbouring The Hague. It is part of Greater The Hague, but it also borders Delft and Rotterdam. It is also part of the larger Rotterdam–The Hague metropolitan area.

Pijnacker and Nootdorp are connected to The Hague and Rotterdam through the Randstadrail public transport system, and Nootdorp also with a tram line.

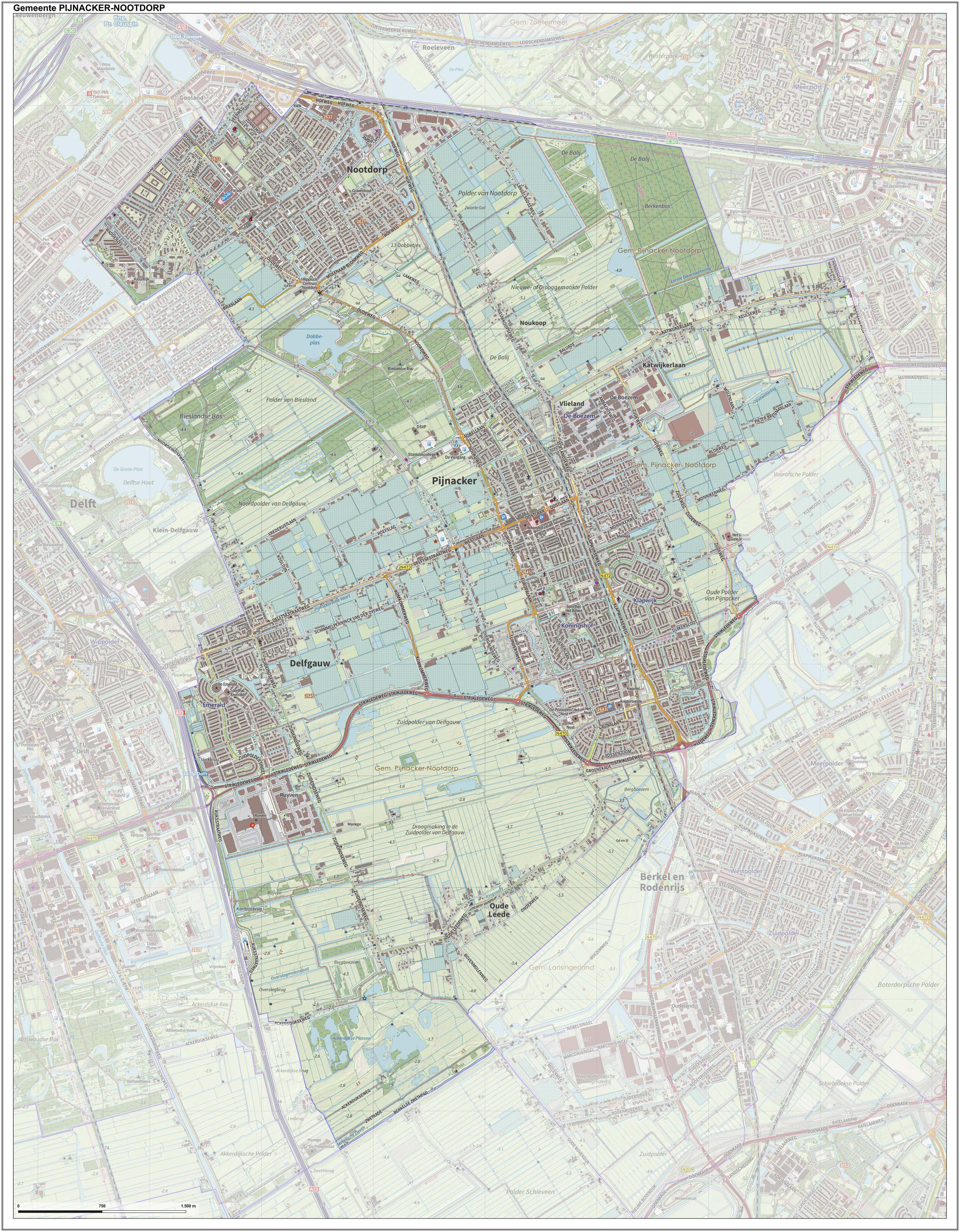
Topographic map of the municipality of Pijnacker-Nootdorp, June 2015

== Notable people ==
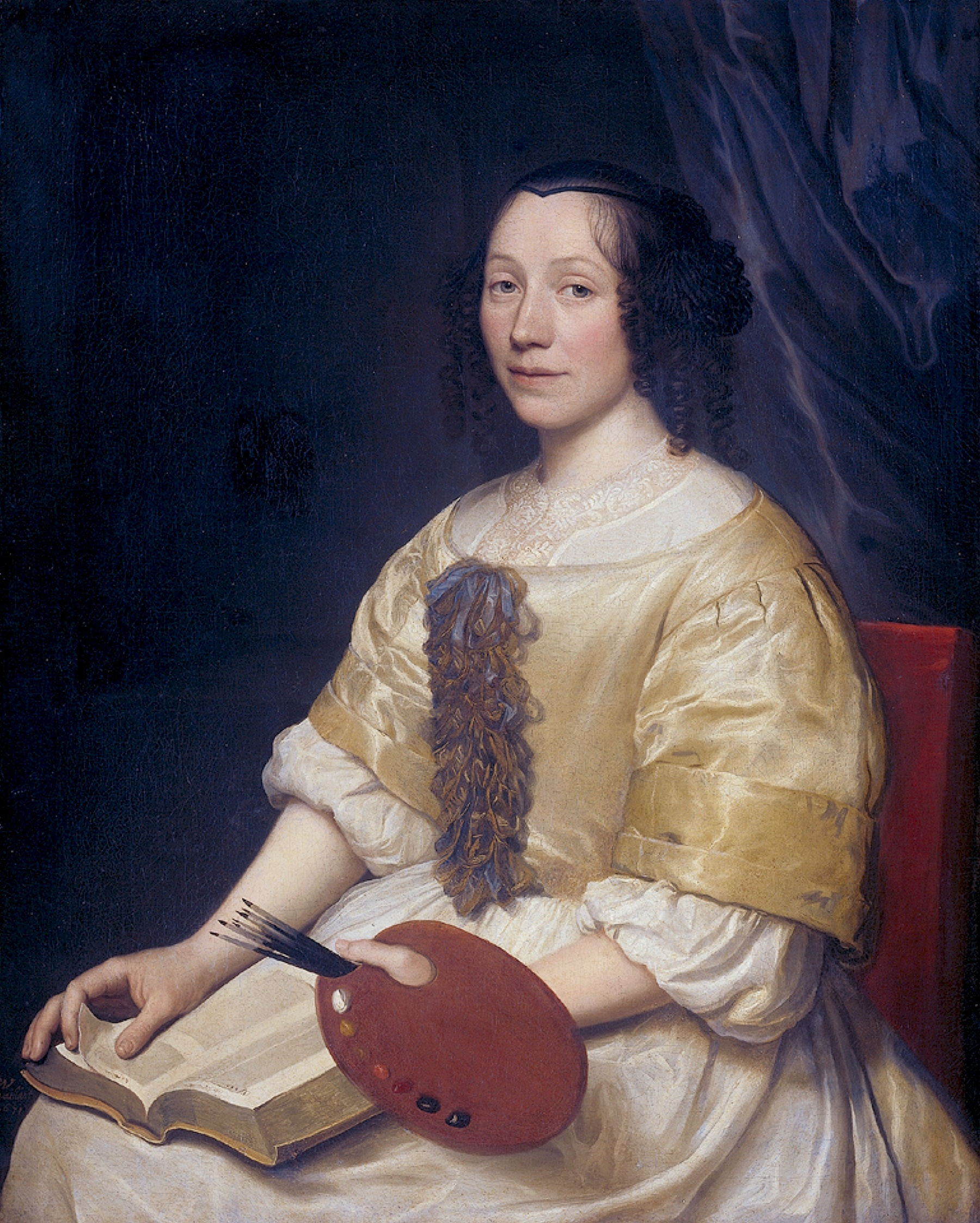
Maria van Oosterwijck, 1671

- Maria van Oosterwijck (1630 in Nootdorp – 1693) a Dutch Golden Age painter, specializing in still lifes
- Prof. Jaap Schrieke (1884 in Pijnacker – 1976) minister during the German occupation of the Netherlands
- Jan Janssen (born 1940 in Nootdorp) a Dutch former professional cyclist and winner of the 1968 Tour de France
- Klaas de Vries (born 1943) a retired Dutch politician, lives in Pijnacker
- Theo Lalleman (1946 in Pijnacker – 2013) a Dutch writer, publisher, video-artist, and cultural entrepreneur
- Rita Verdonk (born 1955) a retired Dutch politician, lives in Nootdorp
- Nancy van der Burg (born 1992 in Delfgauw) a Dutch racing cyclist

== See also ==
- Ackerdijkse Plassen

== Gallery ==
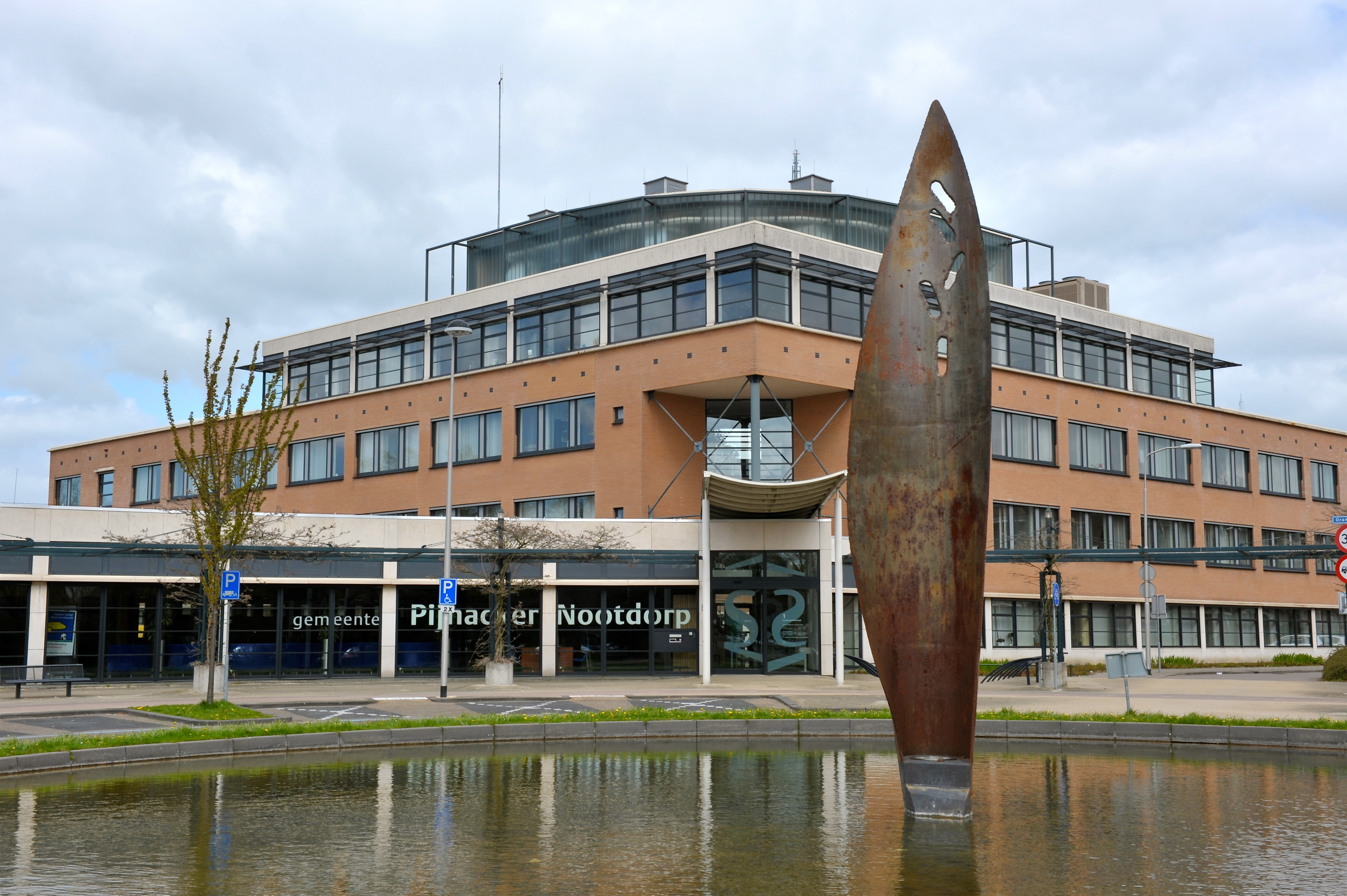
City Hall of Pijnacker-Nootdorp

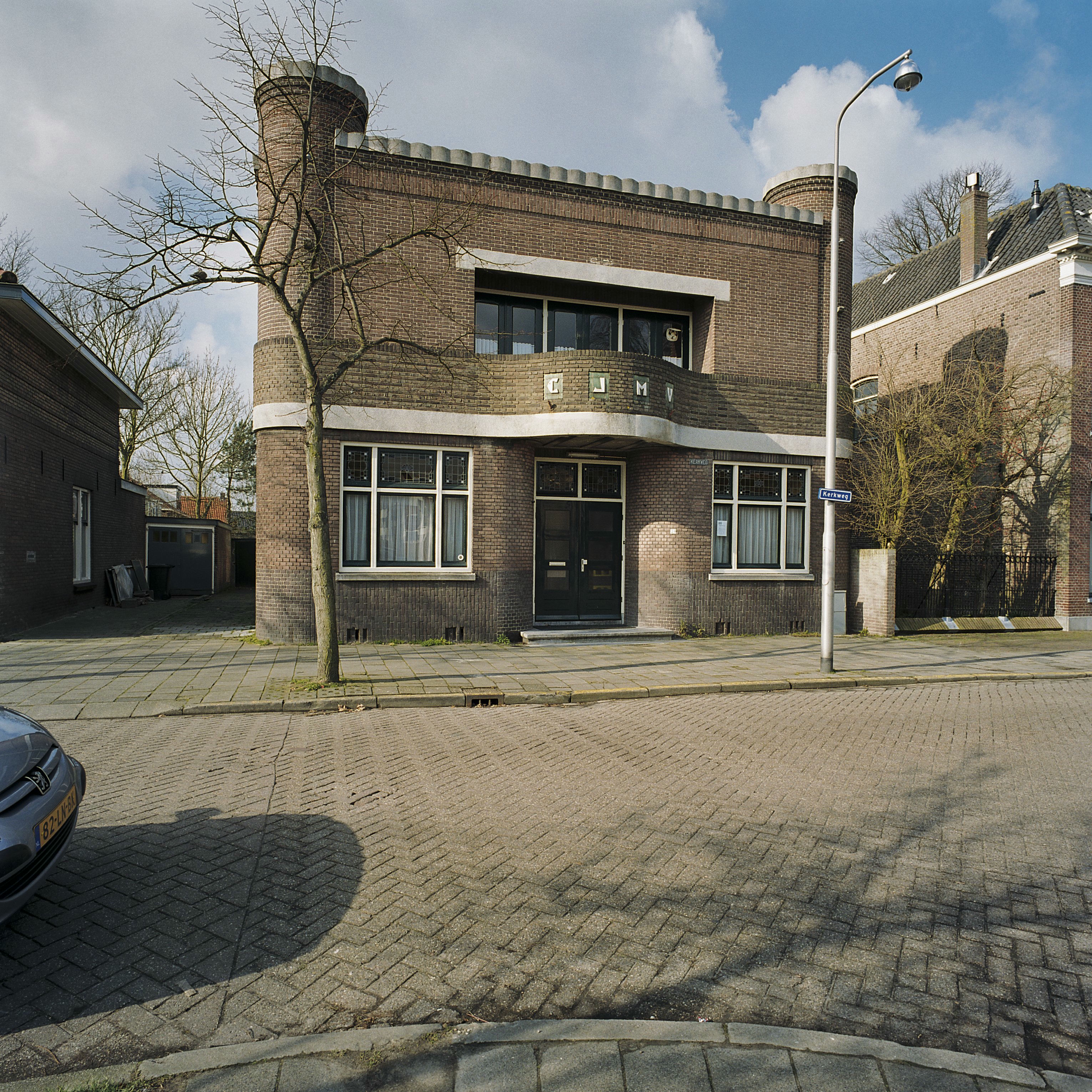
Voorgevel verenigingsgebouw C.J.M.V. - Pijnacker

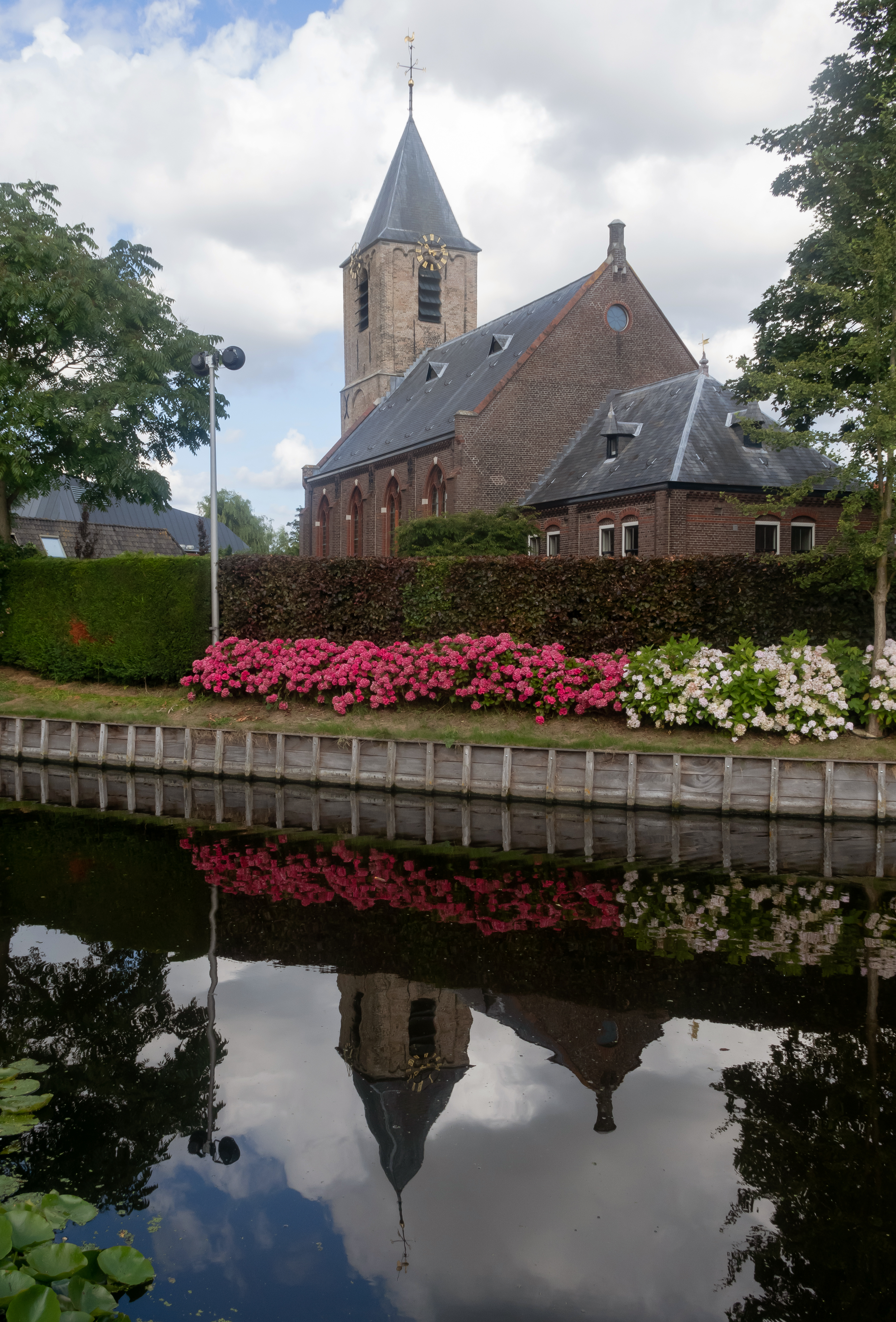
Nootdorp, Village church

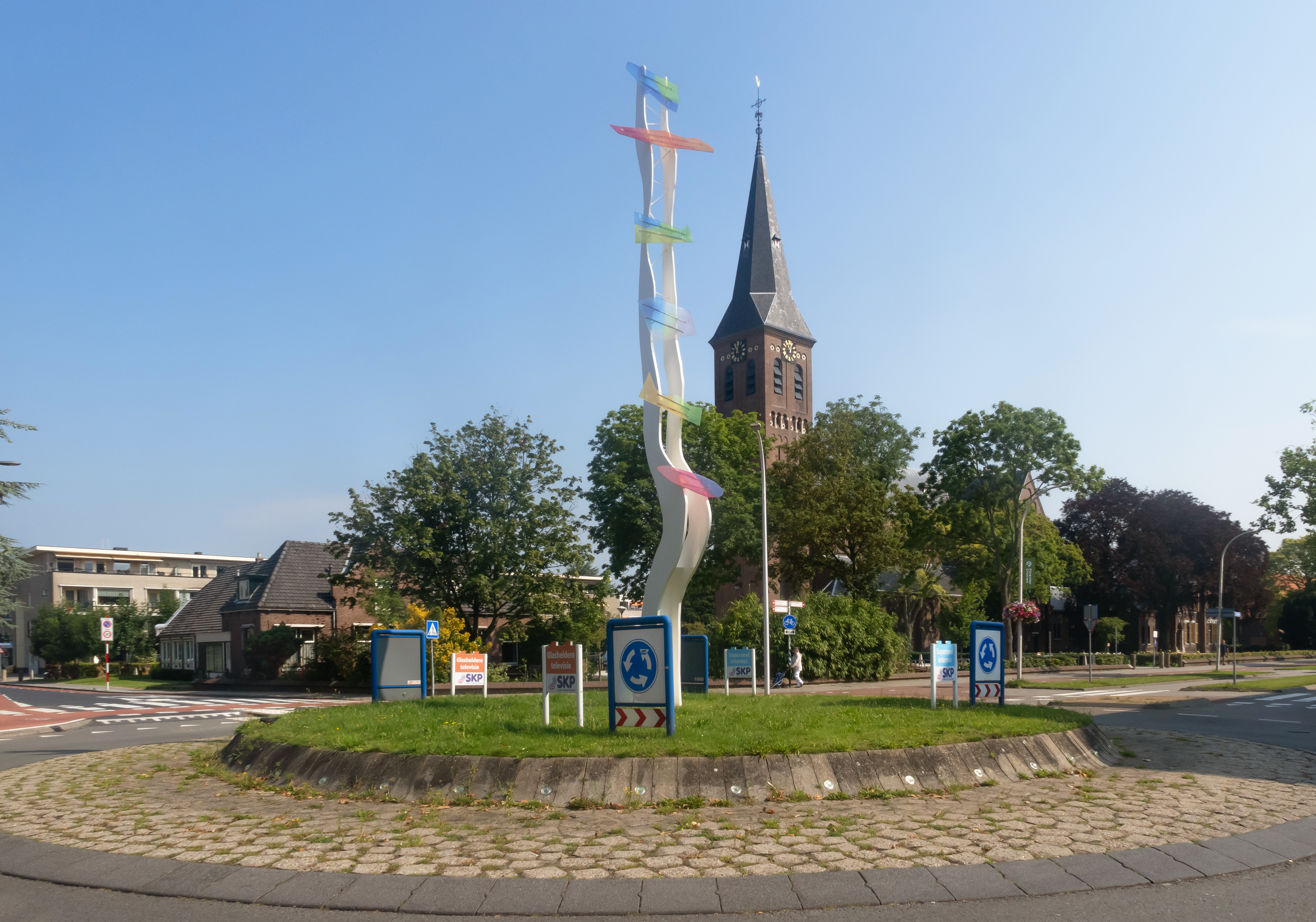
Pijnacker, church: Sint Johannes de Doperkerk

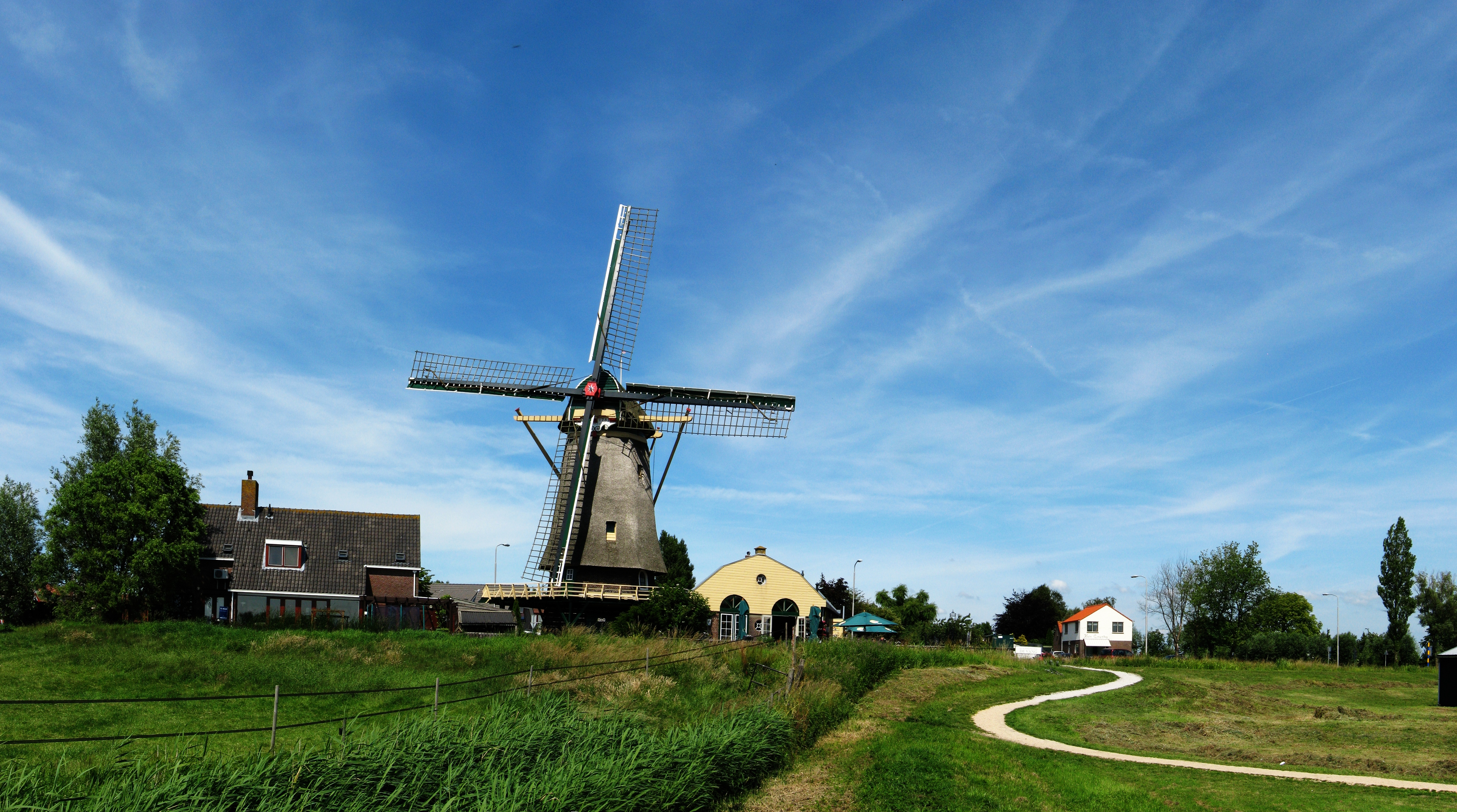
Korenmolen Windlust Nootdorp

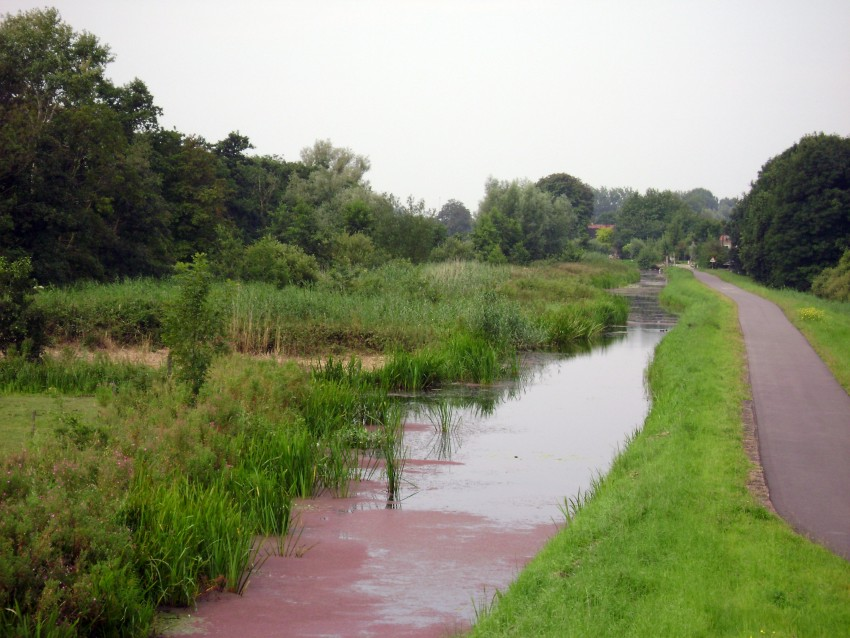
Ackerdijkse Plassen
