= Gouwestreek =

Coordinates: 52°2′N 4°42′E

The Gouwestreek (Dutch pronunciation: [ˈɣʌuəˌstreːk], a Dutch word meaning the "Gouwe area") is the area around Gouda in the province of South Holland in the Netherlands. "Gouwe" refers to the (now canalised) river Gouwe, which runs through Gouda. The Gouwestreek is not an official or precisely defined region, but generally speaking it includes the following municipalities:

- Bodegraven-Reeuwijk
- Boskoop
- Gouda
- Waddinxveen
- Zuidplas
