= Zuid-Hollands Landschap =

Dutch nature conservation organisation

Zuid-Hollands Landschap is a Dutch nature conservation organisation in the Dutch province of South Holland. As of 2026 it manages over 4,700 hectare spread over 120 sites.

The organisation was founded in 1934. In 1967 it was based in Rotterdam, owned 800 hectares and had 4,000 paying contributors. It also relied on subsidies from different levels of the Dutch government. Since 2003 it has been a CBF Toezicht op goeddoen recognized charity. As of 2021 the organisation was based in Delft. It is one of 20 members of LandschappenNL.
