= Princess Mabel of Orange-Nassau =

Member of the Dutch Royal family (born 1968)

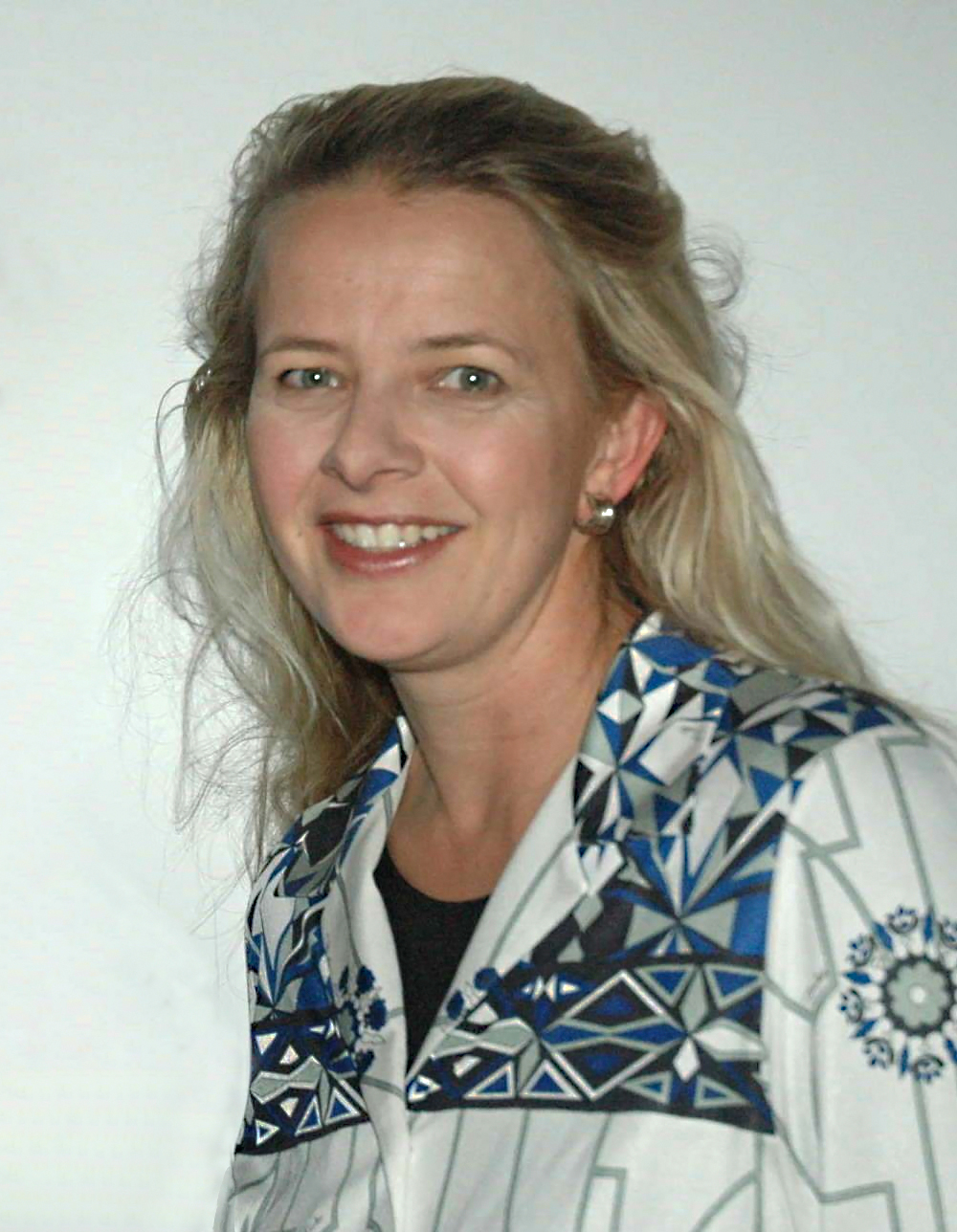
- Mabel in 2011
- Born: Mabel Martine Los; 11 August 1968 (age 58); Pijnacker, Netherlands
- Spouse: Prince Friso of Orange-Nassau (m. 2004; died 2013)
- Issue: Countess Luana; Countess Zaria
- Father: Hendrik Cornelis Los
- Mother: Florence Malde Gijsberdina Kooman

Princess Mabel of Orange-Nassau (Mabel Martine Wisse Smit; born Mabel Martine Los, 11 August 1968), more commonly known as Mabel van Oranje, is a Dutch humanitarian and the widow of Prince Friso and sister-in-law of King Willem-Alexander of the Netherlands. She spends her time in human rights activities, such as co-founding War Child Netherlands, the European Council on Foreign Relations, and Girls Not Brides: The Global Partnership to End Child Marriage.

She served as the first chief executive officer of The Elders, a grouping founded by Nelson Mandela and chaired by Kofi Annan.

In 2005, the World Economic Forum recognised her as a Young Global Leader. Van Oranje is an advisor to several non-profits, including the Coalition for the International Criminal Court, the Malala Fund, Crisis Action and the Open Society Foundations.

== Early life and education ==
She was born Mabel Martine Los in Pijnacker, the Netherlands. Her parents were Hendrik Cornelis Los (27 April 1944 – 18 February 1978) and his wife Florence Malde Gijsberdina Kooman (b. 1944). When she was nine years old, Mabel's father died as a result of a drowning incident after trying to save his neighbor, who fell into a hole in the ice while skating. In 1984, her mother remarried to Rabobank executive Peter Wisse Smit (15 October 1939 – 11 November 2000), whereupon Mabel and her younger sister, Nicoline (1970–2023), took their stepfather's surname. Princess Mabel also has a younger half-sister, Eveline Wisse Smit (b. 1982).

She grew up in the Gooi region in the central Netherlands. After receiving her secondary education at the Gemeentelijk Gymnasium Hilversum, she studied at the University of Amsterdam, where she graduated cum laude with a master's degree in economics and political science in 1993. During her studies, she also completed internships at the United Nations, Shell, ABN AMRO and the Ministry of Foreign Affairs. In addition to Dutch, she speaks fluent English, Spanish and French.

During her university years, she showed special interest in human rights situations around the world, and later specialised in Balkan diplomacy and international relations. In 1995, she was present at the peace conference in Dayton, Ohio.

== Work and activism ==
Wisse Smit was co-founder of the European Action Council for Peace in the Balkans in 1994, which was a non-governmental organisation that strove for peace, democracy, and stability in the Balkans, and had Margaret Thatcher, Simon Wiesenthal, and Valéry Giscard d'Estaing among its members.

In 1995, she was one of the co-founders of War Child Netherlands; she was on the Trustee Board until 1999. In 1997, she was appointed director of EU affairs of the Open Society Institute (OSI) in Brussels, founded by George Soros.

From 2002 to 2008, she worked in the London branch of the Open Society Institute as the International Advocacy Director to help coordinate all international OSI advocacy activities aimed at international policy change.

The World Economic Forum in Switzerland counted her as one of the hundred "Global Leaders for Tomorrow". She is a member of the worldwide Forum of Young Global Leaders, a thinktank and lobby group that aims to tackle global issues.

She is a founding member of the European thinktank European Council on Foreign Relations. She is also a member of the Interpeace Governing Council.

From July 2008 until May 2012, she was the first chief executive officer (CEO) of The Elders, a group of eminent individuals convened by Nelson Mandela to use their wisdom, independent leadership, and experience to tackle some of the world's toughest problems. She oversaw the day-to-day operations for the Elders. In May 2012, Mabel van Oranje resigned as CEO of The Elders following the February 2012 accident in which her husband, Prince Friso, was caught in an avalanche and remained hospitalised until his death on 12 August 2013. She continues to be involved with The Elders as a member of its Advisory Council as Advisory Committee Chair of Girls Not Brides: The Global Partnership to End Child Marriage.

In 2015, she was one of 35 signatories to an open letter addressed to Angela Merkel and Nkosazana Dlamini-Zuma, heads of the G7 in Germany and the African Union (AU) in South Africa, respectively, from the ONE Campaign. As the G7 and AU prepared for the United Nations summit later that year, the letter called for them to put women and girls at the heart of international efforts to combat hunger and misery.

== Controversy ==
After announcing the engagement of Prince Friso with Mabel in June 2003, Prime Minister Jan Peter Balkenende wrote in a letter to parliament that Mabel Wisse Smit had given "incomplete and incorrect information" about the duration and extent of her contacts with known drug lord Klaas Bruinsma, and that because of this, the government had decided not to seek permission for the marriage from parliament.

In a letter to the prime minister dated 9 October, Prince Friso stated the couple had given incomplete information, but had not given any incorrect information nor did they lie. The couple admitted that the sailing friendship with Bruinsma was indeed closer than had been mentioned, but denied a love or sexual relationship. This was later repeated by Wisse Smit in a number of interviews.

According to Dutch law, the government had to submit the couple's marriage request to parliament for its approval, a prerequisite for succession to the throne. Prince Johan Friso said he would marry Smit regardless, and as a result lost his right to become king. He had been second in the order of succession, after his older brother, Willem-Alexander, the Prince of Orange.

In a report later issued by the Stichting Nederlandse Nieuwsmonitor (Dutch News Monitor Foundation), it was alleged that the Dutch media had contributed to blowing things out of proportion after the prime minister made 'unnuanced' comments during two news conferences. During this period, she garnered further negative publicity by revelations about an affair, circa 1993, with married Bosnian UN Ambassador Muhamed Sacirbey.

== Marriage and children ==
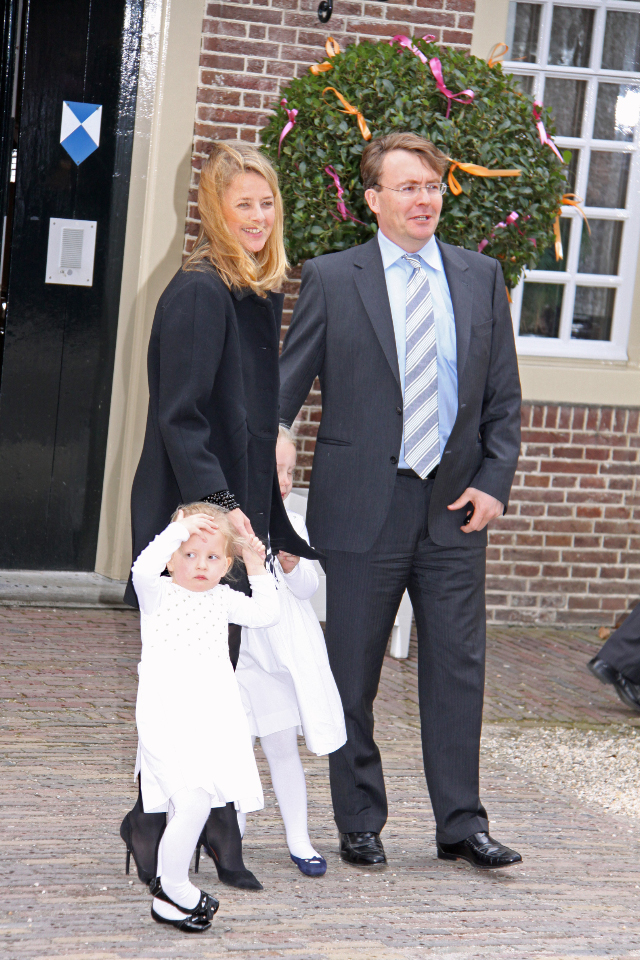
Prince Friso with his wife and daughters in 2010

Mabel Wisse Smit and Prince Friso of Orange-Nassau married at Oude Kerk (Delft) on 24 April 2004. The couple has two daughters:

- Countess Emma Luana Ninette Sophie of Orange-Nassau, Jonkvrouwe van Amsberg, born 26 March 2005 in London, her godparents are Prince Constantijn of the Netherlands (paternal uncle), Eveline Wisse Smit (maternal half-aunt), Baroness Sophie von der Recke (paternal first cousin once removed), and Emma Bonino (parent's friend). She attended Sevenoaks School, a coeducational private school in Kent, England.
- Countess Joanna Zaria Nicoline Milou of Orange-Nassau, Jonkvrouwe van Amsberg, born 18 June 2006 in London, her godparents are Willem-Alexander of the Netherlands (paternal uncle); Prince Jaime, Count of Bardi (her father's maternal first cousin), Nicoline Wisse Smit (maternal aunt), Ruben Amerling (parent's friend), and Maria Luz Luano (parent's friend).

As he had not asked the Dutch parliament for permission to marry, Friso ceased being a member of the royal house and forfeited his and his future children's succession rights. Therefore, neither his wife nor daughters are members of the royal house. They remained, however, one of the richest families in the Netherlands.

Prince Friso died in 2013, after spending one and a half years in a coma due to complications he suffered when he was buried under an avalanche.

== Titles, style, and names ==
Since her marriage, Mabel uses the style of Royal Highness and the titles of Princess of Orange-Nassau, Countess of Orange-Nassau, and Lady van Amsberg. Although she was not legally created a princess in her own right (a rare privilege in any royal family), it is customary for wives and widows of male members of the Dutch royal family to be accorded the female counterparts of their husbands' titles. It was decided that their children each would receive the titles of Count or Countess of Orange-Nassau and Jonkheer or Jonkvrouw van Amsberg.

== Honours and awards ==
=== National honours ===
- Grand Cross of the Order of the House of Orange (16 June 2022)
- King Willem-Alexander Investiture Medal (30 April 2013)

=== Other awards ===
- In 2014, Princess Mabel of Orange was nominated for the Toastmasters' Communication Award by the Dutch chapter of Toastmasters International for her performance at TEDxAmsterdam.
- Princess Mabel was awarded an Honorary Degree of Doctor of Laws (LL.D.) from the Glasgow Caledonian University in 2018, in recognition of her contribution to human rights across the world and her commitment to non-profit organisations.
