= Ackerdijkse Plassen =

Nature reserve in the Netherlands

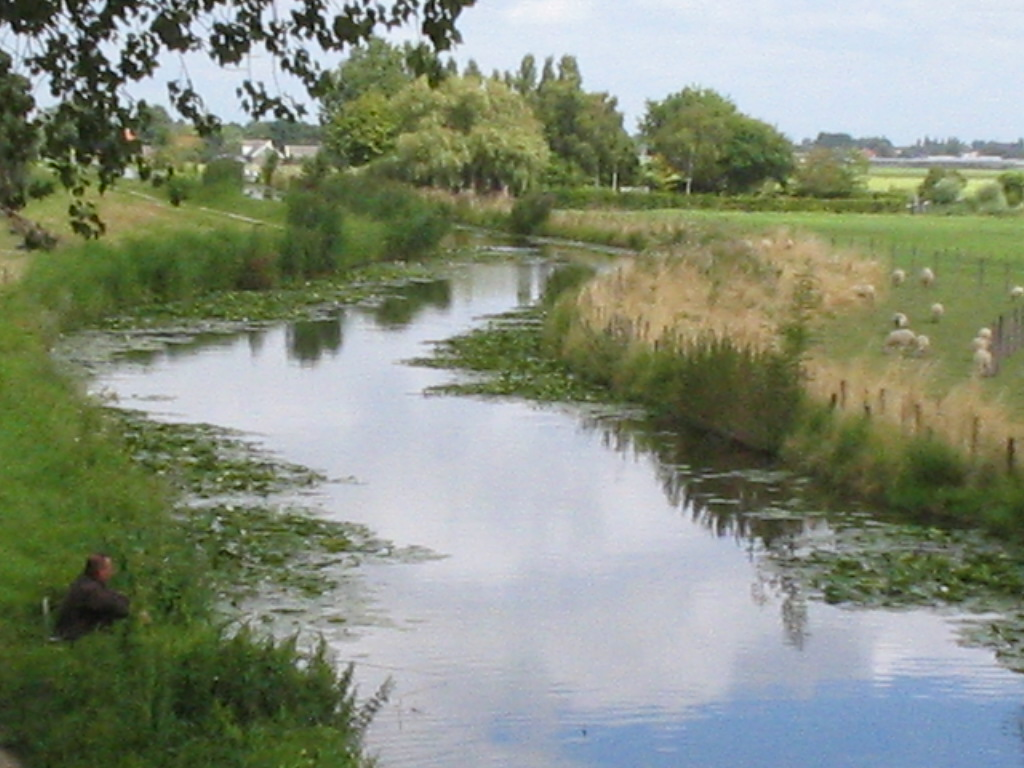
- The BerkelscheZweth in the Ackerdijkse Plassen

- Location within Netherlands
- Location: South Holland
- Nearest city: Pijnacker-Nootdorp
- Coordinates: 51°58′39″N 4°24′30″E
- Operator: Vereniging Natuurmonumenten

Ackerdijkse Plassen is a nature reserve in Oude Leede, a village in the municipality of Pijnacker-Nootdorp, (south of Delft and west of Berkel en Rodenrijs). It is one of the most important bird areas in the Netherlands. In addition to 115 species of breeding birds, the ponds are visited annually by about eighty species of migratory birds, such as greenish warbler, Greater short-toed lark, short-eared owl, booted eagle, lesser spotted eagle, black crowned night heron and osprey. Konik provide grazing in the area.

The area contains a restored farmhouse from 1660.

The area is closed to visitors; however, there are hiking trails and bike paths around the outside of the area.

The Nature Society took over the management of the area from the Birdlife Netherlands.
