= Energy autarkic/autonomic habitats =

Autarky can be defined as the quality of being self-sufficient, thus energy-autarkic habitats are human dwellings which are independent concerning energy consumption for living. This may be based on resource efficiency, choice of building materials, living space, and so forth. Autonomic habitats are similar but reflect the fact that the person desires to act morally solely for the sake of doing "good", independently of other incentives. Subsistence agriculture can be considered a form of autarkic living. With the advent of industrialization networks for energy were set up, which led to dependency, but made life easier in many respects. Autarkic living can be seen as a trend "back to the roots": using renewable energy and being independent of coal, gas and oil.

== Historic examples for autarkic habitats ==
There are several historical examples of habitats that could be considered autarkic, including: Stone Age caves/shelters/huts, mountain cabins, Bedouin tents, and Inuit igloos.

== Past and present examples for autarkic habitats ==
=== Antique houses and urban design ===
Even in antic times people thought of energy-efficient living and tried to optimise their conditions. By orientation to the winter sun to get as much sunrays as possible for heating up the building and less exposure to the winter wind, protection from the summer sun to achieve the different effect and ventilation by the summer wind, compact forms with less surface.

=== Igloo ===
An Igloo is a habitat with a compact form that has little surface (compare the low energy form of a drop of water; compare the optimised relation of volume to surface of a ball or globe). This results in less exposure to the wind and reduces hence the cooling of the building. The igloo contains an airtight shell which again assists to keep the temperature inside constant. Concerning heating there is relatively small volume to heat (as mentioned above; volume-surface-ratio).

=== Peat house ===
A peat house provides, similar to the igloo, a compact form with less surface and hence less exposure to the wind. It also shows a nearly airtight shell with good heat insulation (peat). An optimised orientation to the sun adds additional degrees during the day.

=== Log house ===
Log houses have the same advantages as mentioned above. The material wood offers also a good heat insulation and a good airtightness can be reached by filling the gaps with moss and clay.

=== Monte Rosa Cabin ===
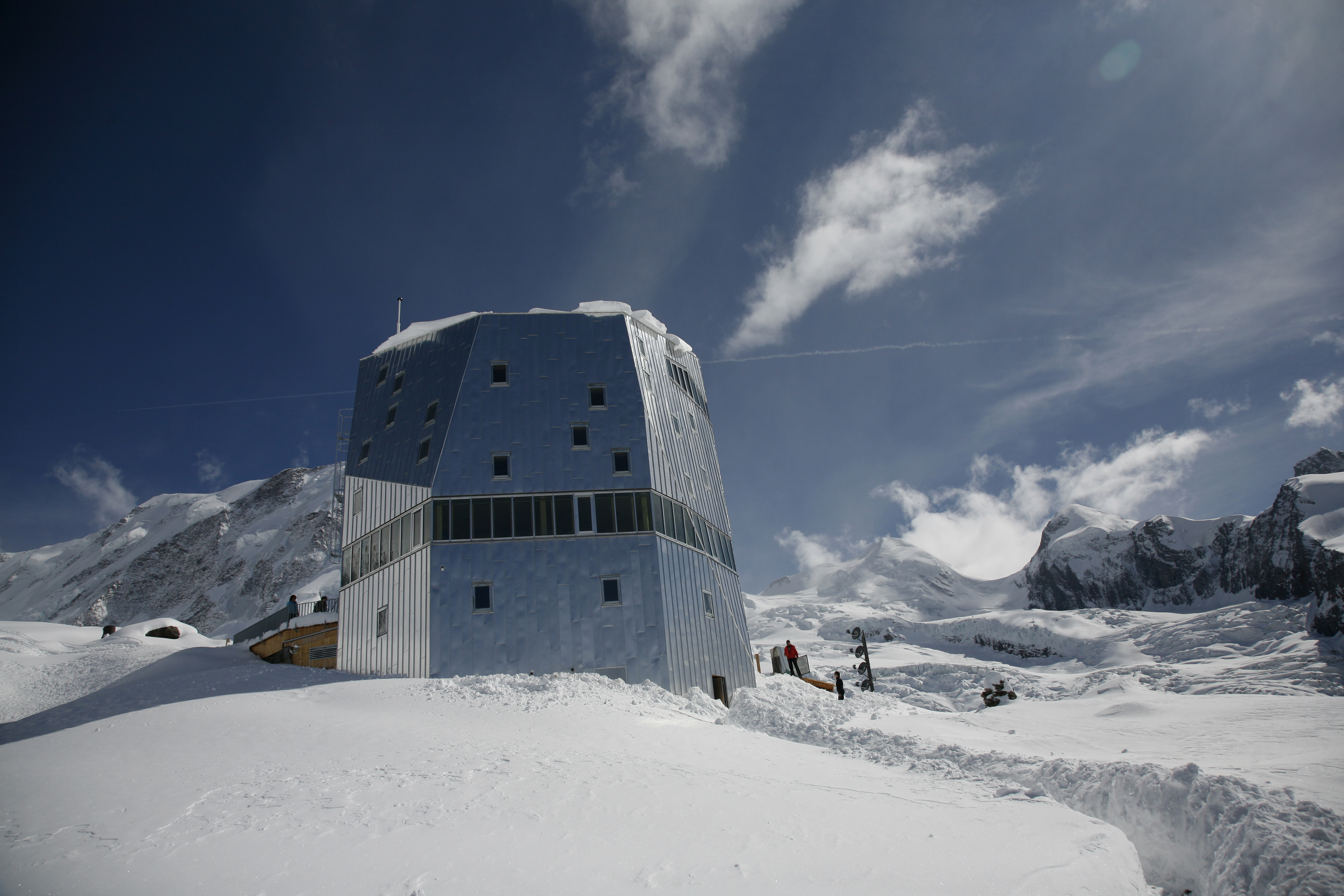
Monte Rosa cabin

Monte Rosa Cabins mark a milestone in high alpine building presenting a high degree of energy autarky of over 90%, meaning that 90% of needed energy is obtained locally from renewable sources. The technical systems are based on existing technology (combined heat and power unit, photovoltaics, thermal collectors), innovative wastewater treatment (the wastewater is going to be purified on-site to be reused as greywater) and foremost an ingenious energy management, which takes into account external conditions such as weather forecast and anticipated occupancy schedules to achieve the demanding goal of the high degree of autarky.

=== Mikrohaus ===
The basis for Mikrohaus is a 8,80 × 3,44 × 3,25 m cube that allows as kind of modular assembly system to combine several of them and hence to generate a flexibility in the size. The cube(s) don't have any fundament (only screws of 1,40 m length) which allows some kind of mobile living. No cement and therefore time for drying is requisite. Additional floats allow also an installation on water. The building offers a high isolation up to passive house including e.g. photovoltaic (PV) energy supply. The cubical form allows a good ratio from volume to surface. The concept includes waste water treatment for greywater via wastewater treatment plant with an ultraviolet light (UV) treatment unit for sanitary water. Additional planted walls (www.gruenwand.at) are used outside (for cooling/summer, isolation/winter, noise prevention) and inside (for climate and humidity aspects) which also are used as water-filters as kind of biological purification plant.

=== Autarc homes ===
Autarc homes provides the 1st swimming passive-house worldwide and was originated to provide clients autarkic buildings on the basis of a protective handling of our natural resources to present the following generations a working basis of life. The swimming and rotatable passiv-house has its own on-board energy generation, water supply and disposal. The idea is to provide a sustainable, energy-efficient, environmentally compatible and affordable living space. The building can be orientated at the sun to get the most possible effect out of it. As this building is located on water the rotation process is done very energy-efficient. The tasks are decentralized energy supply and storage, decentralized effluent disposal and recycling/ reprocessing and drinking water supply.

== Energy production ==
Life on our planet is a permanent energy flow between living things and the environment. Most of the currently used energy resources, such as oil, coal, natural gas and uranium are non-renewable. The supply of them buried in the earth is limited and (with the exception of uranium) we are using them up at a rapid pace. Renewable energy resources such as Solar energy, wind energy, small hydroelectricity (e.g. Swimming hydroelectric power plant), geothermal energy and biomass fuels are becoming increasingly attractive. Solar, Photovoltaics, water and wind energy do not send pollutants into the air as occurs with coal and petroleum energy.

Hydrogen storage (storage by hydrogen) The objectives are to store H^{2} in solid metal hydrides from which it can be readily recovered by heating which is an alternative and safe, highly volume efficient storage method. The final aim is to provide a storage technology that is attractive both economically and environmentally.

== See also ==
- Green building
- Passive house
- Zero-energy building
- Energy Autonomy: The Economic, Social & Technological Case for Renewable Energy, by Hermann Scheer

== Examples ==
- 1st zero-energy-hotel
- Boutiquehotel Stadthalle won "Klimaschutzpreis 2010"
- Autarc floating pavilion
- Green Energy Options for Housing
- Renewable energy options for buildings: Case studies
- Energy Autonomy: New Politics for Renewable Energy
