= Delftse Hout =

District of Delft, Netherlands

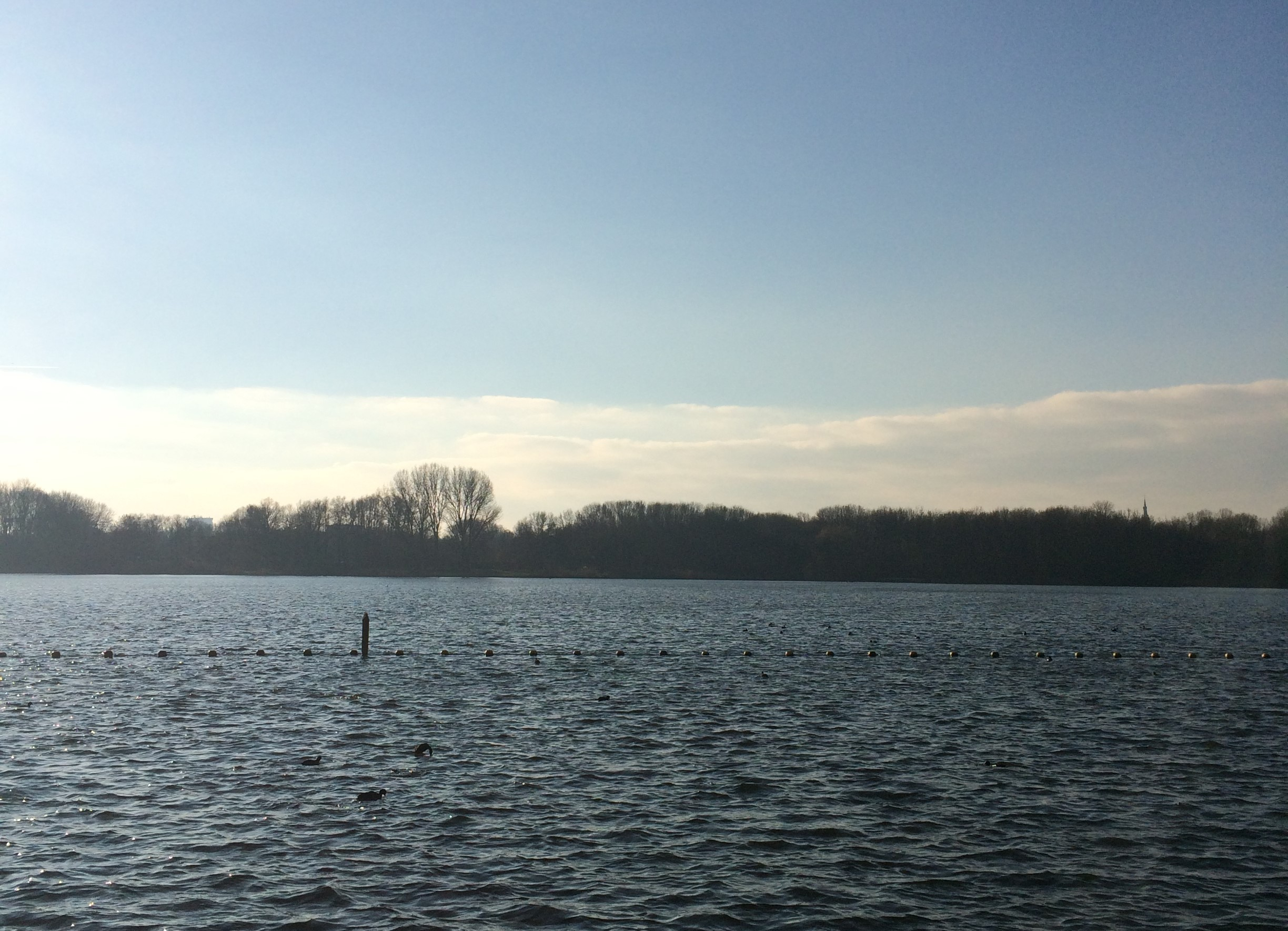
De Grote Plas in Delftse Hout.

Delftse Hout is a district in the northeast of Delft, Netherlands. Delftse Hout has about 300 inhabitants.

Delftse Hout is the location of the De Grote Plas, a lake with origins in the sand excavations performed to build new neighbourhoods in Delft. Swimming in the lake is usually allowed. Other destinations in the district are IKEA Delft, the Arboretum-Heempark Delft gardens, the Iepenhof Cemetery, a camping and a park.

== Public transport ==
Two bus lines currently operate within the area, with most stops only being served in the summer: Line 61 and line 64, providing great access to the district during the summer and moderate access in the winter.
