= South Holland =

Province of the Netherlands

South Holland Zuid-Holland (Dutch)
- Province
- Province of South Holland; Provincie Zuid-Holland (Dutch)
- Flag Coat of arms Brandmark
- Motto: "Vigilate Deo confidentes" (Latin) "Watch, trusting in God"
- Anthem: "Lied van Zuid-Holland" (Dutch) "Song of South Holland"
- Location of South Holland in the Netherlands

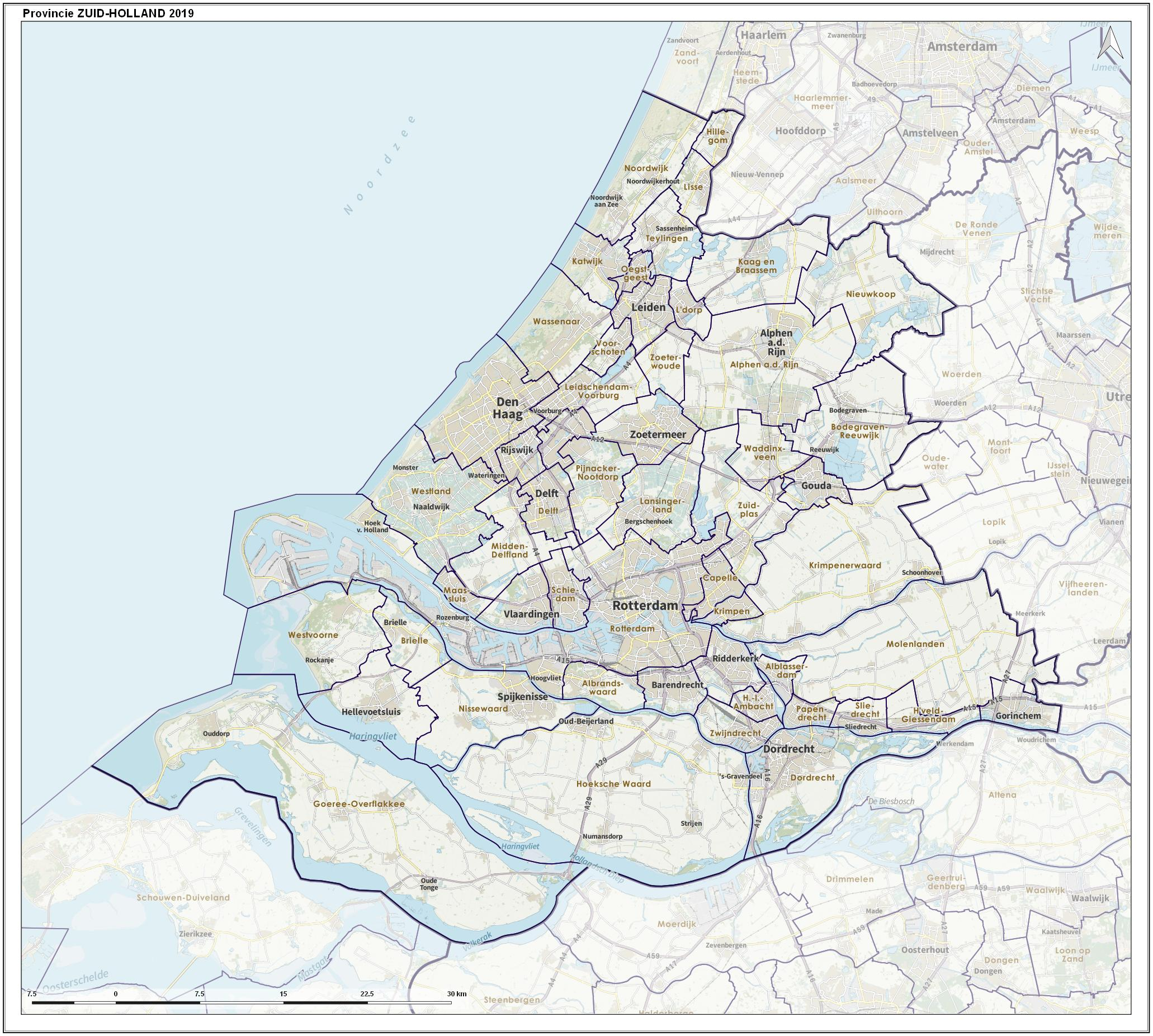
- Topography map of South Holland
- Coordinates: 52°00′N 4°40′E
- Country: Netherlands
- Established: 1840 (split-up of Holland)
- Capital: The Hague
- Largest city: Rotterdam

Government
  - King's Commissioner: Wouter Kolff (VVD)
  - Council: States of South Holland

Area (2023)
  - Total: 3,308 km^{2} (1,277 sq mi)
  - Land: 2,698 km^{2} (1,042 sq mi)
  - Water: 609 km^{2} (235 sq mi)
  - Rank: 6th

Population (1 January 2023)
  - Total: 3,804,906
  - Rank: 1st
  - Density: 1,410/km^{2} (3,700/sq mi)
  - Rank: 1st

GDP
  - Total: €231.245 bn (2024)
  - Per capita: €59,862 (2024)
- ISO 3166 code: NL-ZH
- HDI (2023): 0.954 very high · 3rd of 12
- Website: zuid-holland.nl

South Holland (Dutch: Zuid-Holland [ˌzœyt ˈɦɔlɑnt]) is a province of the Netherlands with a population of over 3.8 million as of January 2023 and a population density of about 1,410/km^{2} (3,700/sq mi), making it the country's most populous province and one of the world's most densely populated areas. Situated on the North Sea in the west of the Netherlands, South Holland covers an area of 3,308 km^{2} (1,277 sq mi), of which 609 km^{2} (235 sq mi) is water. It borders North Holland to the north, Utrecht and Gelderland to the east, and North Brabant and Zeeland to the south. The provincial capital is the Dutch seat of government The Hague, while its largest city is Rotterdam. The Rhine-Meuse-Scheldt delta drains through South Holland into the North Sea. Europe's busiest seaport, the Port of Rotterdam, is located in South Holland.

== History ==
=== Early history ===
Archaeological discoveries in Hardinxveld-Giessendam indicate that the area of South Holland has been inhabited since at least c. 7,500 years before present, probably by nomadic hunter-gatherers. Agriculture and permanent settlements probably originated around 2,000 years later, based on excavations near Vlaardingen. In the classical antiquity, South Holland was part of the Roman Province of Germania Inferior, and the border of the Roman Empire ran along the Old Rhine and reached the North Sea near Katwijk. The Romans built fortresses along the border, such as Praetorium Agrippinae near modern-day Valkenburg, Matilo near modern-day Leiden, and Albaniana near modern-day Alphen aan den Rijn. A city was founded near modern-day Voorburg, Forum Hadriani. It was built according to the grid plan, and facilitated a square, a court, a bathhouse and several temples.

After the departure of the Romans, the area belonged to the Frisian Kingdom, after which it was conquered by the Frankish king Dagobert I in 636. In 690, the Anglo-Saxon monk Willibrord arrived near Katwijk and was granted permission to spread Roman Catholicism by the Frankish king Pepin II. He accordingly founded a church in Oegstgeest, after which the entire area was gradually Christianised. The area was appointed to East Francia in the Treaty of Verdun in 843, after which the king granted lands to Gerolf, who had helped him claim the lands. This was the birth of the County of Holland. Gerolf was later succeeded by Dirk I, who continued to rule Holland under the Frankish king. In 1248, count William II ordered the construction of the Ridderzaal, which was later finished by his son and successor Floris V.

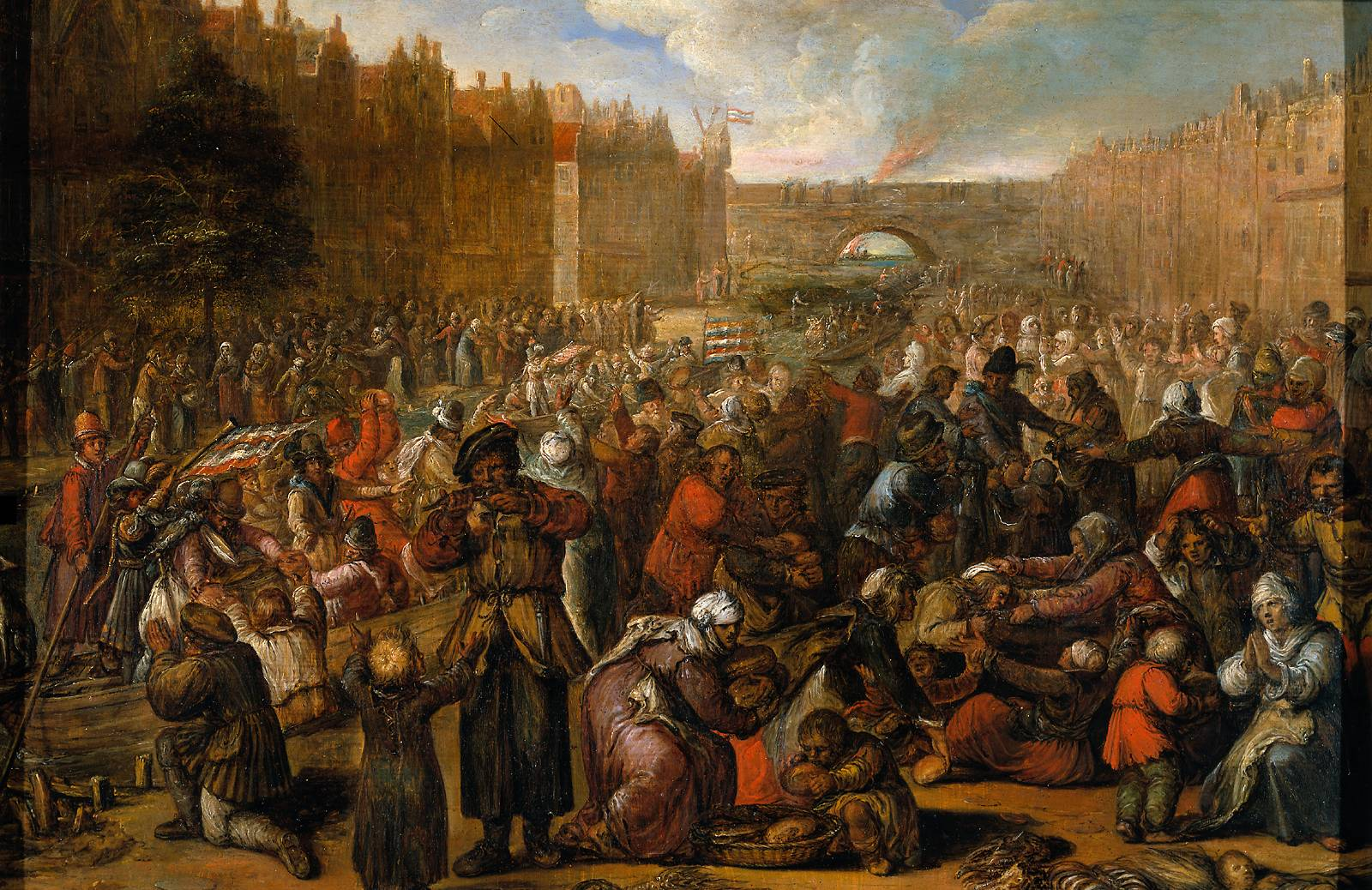
The liberation of Leiden (1574)

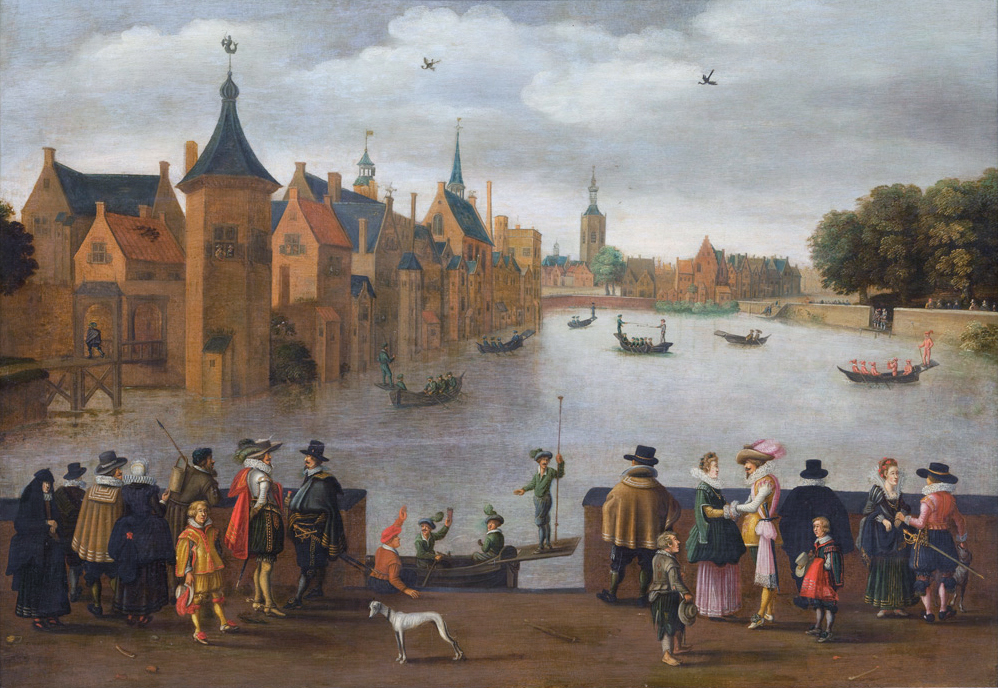
The Binnenhof by the Hofvijver (1625)

The first city in South Holland to receive city rights was Dordrecht, which did so in 1220. The city retained a dominant position in the area until it was struck by a series of floods in the late 14th century. The same century also saw a series of civil wars, the Hook and Cod wars, concerning the succession of count William IV. Both his daughter Jacqueline and his brother John, the latter supported by Philip the Good, Duke of Burgundy, claimed the throne. The conflict ended in 1490, with John victorious.

Overall, the area of South Holland remained largely agrarian throughout the late Middle Ages. This changed around 1500, when Holland became Europe's most urbanised area. During the Eighty Years' War, the area of South Holland was the scene of the Capture of Brielle, the Siege of Leiden and the assassination of William the Silent.

The United Netherlands declared their independence in 1581, and Holland quickly emerged as the country's dominant province, with important trading cities such as Leiden, Delft, Gouda, and Dordrecht. In 1575, the Netherlands' first university was founded in Leiden by William the Silent. The Hague, which had originated around the castle of the counts of Holland, became its new political centre. Both the States of Holland and the States General seated in the Binnenhof. The Dutch Golden Age blossomed in the 17th century. The south of Holland, back then often referred to as the Zuiderkwartier (literally "South Quarter"), was the birthplace and residence of scientists such as Antoni van Leeuwenhoek and Christiaan Huygens, philosophers such as Baruch Spinoza and Pierre Bayle, and painters such as Johannes Vermeer, Rembrandt van Rijn and Jan Steen.

=== As a province ===
The province of South Holland as it is today has its origins in the period of French rule from 1795 to 1813. This was a time of bewildering changes to the Dutch system of provinces. In 1795, the Batavian Republic was proclaimed and the old order was swept away by a series of constitutional changes in the following years. In the Constitution enacted on 23 April 1798, the old borders were radically changed. The republic was reorganised into eight departments with roughly equal populations. The south of Holland was split up into three departments. The islands in the south were merged with Zeeland and the west of North Brabant to form the Department of the Scheldt and Meuse. The north of the area became the Department of the Delf. A small region in the east of the area became part of the Department of the Rhine, which spanned much of Gelderland and Utrecht. In 1801, the old borders were restored when the department of Holland was created. The reorganisation had been short-lived, but it gave birth to the concept of a division of Holland, creating less dominant provinces. In 1807, Holland was reorganised once again. This time, the department was split in two. The south, what would later become South Holland, was called the Department of Maasland. This also did not last long. In 1810, all the Dutch provinces were integrated into the French Empire, and Maasland was renamed Bouches-de-la-Meuse.

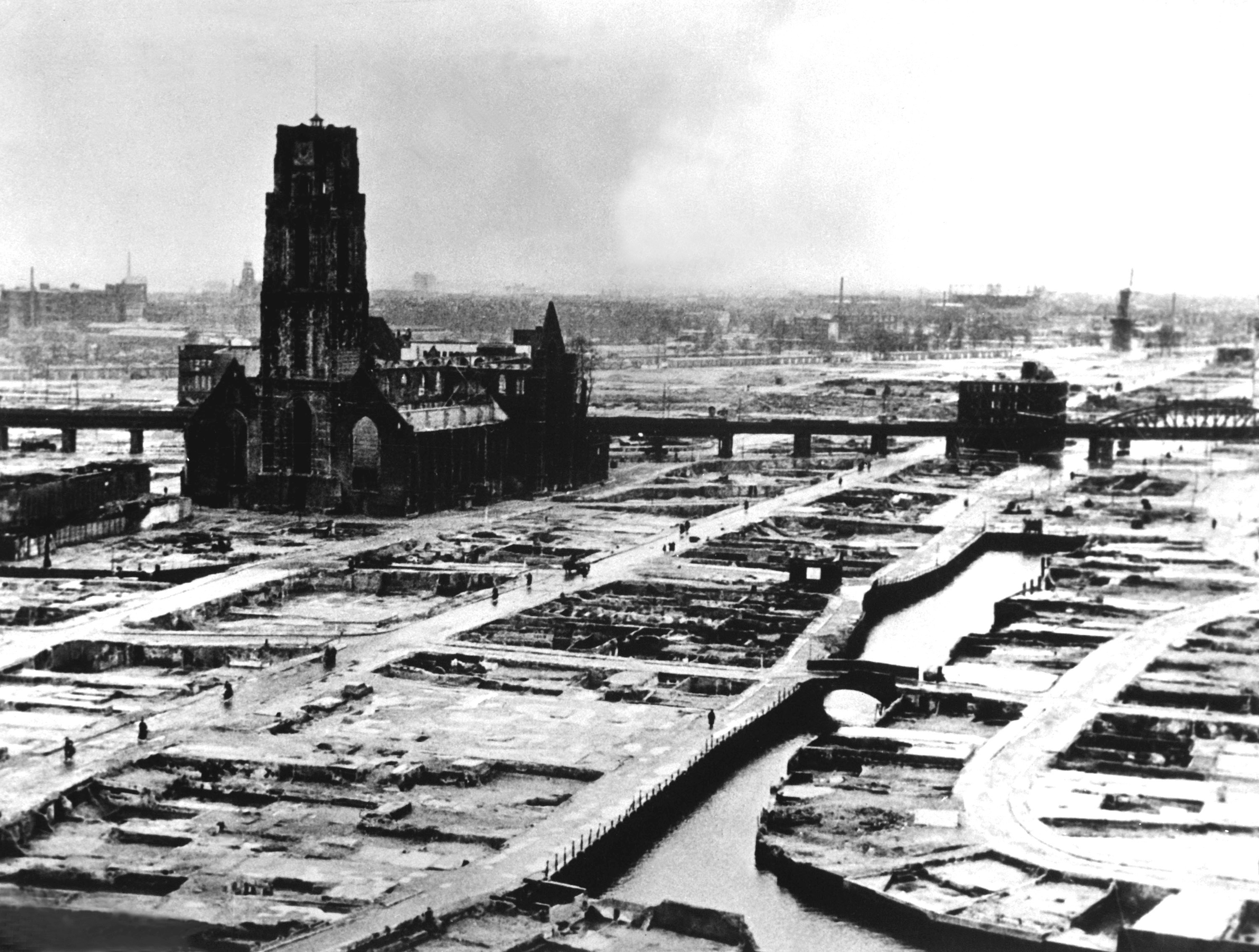
The centre of Rotterdam in ruins after the Rotterdam Blitz (1940)

After the defeat of the French in 1813, this organisation remained unchanged for a year or so. When the 1814 Constitution was introduced, most borders were restored to their situation before the French period. The north and south of Holland were reunited as the province of Holland. However, the division had not completely been undone. Since its re-establishment in 1814, Holland had always had two King's Commissioners, one for the north and one for the south. Even though the province had been reunited, the two areas were still treated differently in some ways and the idea of dividing Holland remained alive. In 1840, it was decided to once again split Holland into North and South Holland, because the province of Holland was deemed too dominant in area, population and wealth. In the late 20th and early 21st centuries, five municipalities were transferred from South Holland to Utrecht; Oudewater in 1970, Woerden in 1989, Vianen in 2002, Leerdam and Zederik in 2019.

The construction of the Nieuwe Waterweg in 1863 marked the start of the growth of the Port of Rotterdam. On 14 May 1940, during the Second World War, the centre of Rotterdam was destroyed by a German bombardment. The subsequent German occupation of the Netherlands resulted in anti-Jewish measures, and many members of Dutch resistance were captured and executed on the Waalsdorpervlakte. At the same time, the Atlantikwall was constructed along the coast. After the Second World War, in 1953, the south of South Holland was heavily struck by the North Sea flood, which took the lives of 677 South Hollanders. After this, the Dutch government decided for the construction of the Delta Works, which came to an end with the completion of the Maeslantkering in 1997.

== Geography ==
South Holland covers an area of 3,308 km^{2} (1,277 sq mi), of which 609 km^{2} (235 sq mi) is water. It borders the North Sea to the west, North Holland to the north, Utrecht and Gelderland to the east, and North Brabant and Zeeland to the south. Beside the dunes along the North Sea coast, the province is almost entirely flat and mostly consists of polders. The centre of South Holland and the area along the coast in the west are largely urban, part of the Randstad conurbation, while the east of the province is more agrarian and belongs to the Groene Hart, literally Green Heart. The south of the province is a collection of islands in the Rhine–Meuse–Scheldt delta.

The Duin- en Bollenstreek is a region in the northwest of South Holland, around Katwijk, that features coastal dunes and the cultivation of flower bulbs. To the south of the region lie mostly pastures on sand soil, that form the transition to more urban area. This urban area runs along the Old Rhine, from Katwijk via Rijnsburg to Leiden and Zoeterwoude-Rijndijk. South of Leiden and north of The Hague lies an area where a landscape of dunes bordering the North Sea in the west transitions to one of peat more to the east. The easternmost tip of South Holland is part of De Biesbosch, one of the largest national parks of the Netherlands and one of the last freshwater tide areas in Europe. Other parks in South Holland, although no national parks, include Delftse Hout east of Delft, Ackerdijkse Plassen, a bird reserve north of Rotterdam, and Buytenpark and Westerpark near Zoetermeer. The Kagerplassen are a collection of lakes north-east of Leiden, popular for boating, watersports, fishing, camping and walking.

The southern part of South Holland consists of a number of islands of the Rhine–Meuse–Scheldt delta. Although technically islands in the sense that they are surrounded by rivers, canals or other bodies of water, most of these islands are well connected to the rest of the province via bridges, tunnels and dams. The southern islands, most notably Goeree-Overflakkee (1 on the map), Tiengemeten (2), Hoeksche Waard (6) and Voorne-Putten (4/5), are largely agrarian, while more to the north, the islands are more urban, such as Dordrecht (7), IJsselmonde (9) and Rozenburg (10), while other islands, like Rozenburg (10), are mostly used for petrochemical industry. Together, these cities form the Rijnmond conurbation, centred on the city of Rotterdam. Together with Haaglanden (centred on The Hague) and Delfland (centred on Delft) in the north, and the Drechtsteden to the south-east, this conurbation in turn forms the South Wing of the Randstad conurbation, which spans across South Holland, North Holland and Utrecht.

Other regions in South Holland include Alblasserwaard, Gouwestreek ("The Gouwe Area"), Hoeksche Waard, Krimpenerwaard, Rijnland ("Rhineland"), Rijnstreek ("The Rhine Area"), Vijfheerenlanden and Westland (roughly including Hook of Holland and the municipalities of Westland and Midden-Delfland).

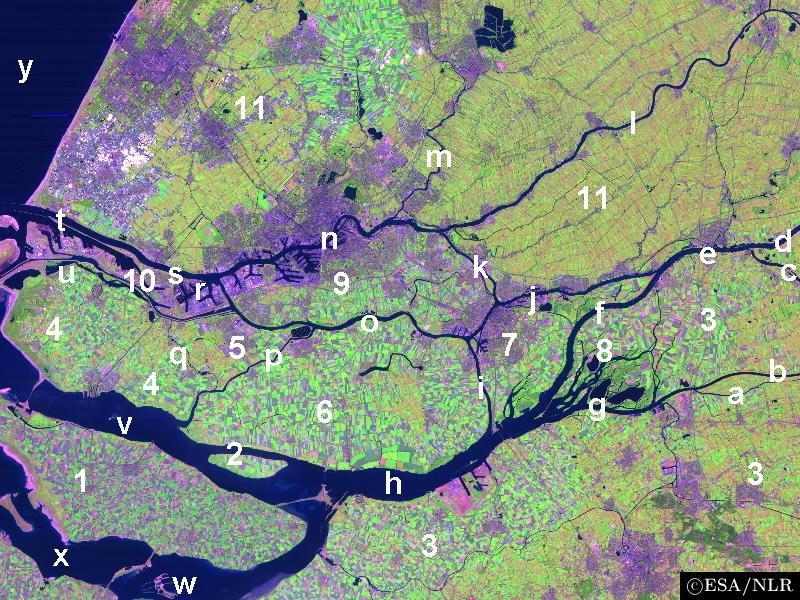
A satellite image of the Rhine–Meuse–Scheldt delta, showing the islands of South Holland

A satellite image of South Holland

A topographic map of South Holland as of 2013

=== Climate ===
Like the rest of the Netherlands, South Holland experiences a temperate oceanic climate, a Cfb-class according to the Köppen climate classification. The climate is influenced by the North Sea and the Atlantic Ocean, which results in relatively cooler summers and milder winters. Rain showers are common in the fall and winter seasons. Because of the flat surface, wind storms are also not uncommon in the winter. Although rain occurs all year long, the first six months of the year are relatively dry. Eastern winds can result in temporary continental climate conditions with relatively warm and dry summers and cold and stormy winters. The temperature varies between the 2 °C and 6 °C in the winter and 17 °C and 20 °C in the summer.

Climate data for Rotterdam The Hague Airport
Month	Jan	Feb	Mar	Apr	May	Jun	Jul	Aug	Sep	Oct	Nov	Dec	Year
Record high °C (°F)	14.1 (57.4)	16.7 (62.1)	21.2 (70.2)	26.7 (80.1)	30.5 (86.9)	32.8 (91.0)	33.1 (91.6)	34.9 (94.8)	29.0 (84.2)	24.8 (76.6)	18.3 (64.9)	15.1 (59.2)	34.9 (94.8)
Mean daily maximum °C (°F)	6.0 (42.8)	6.6 (43.9)	9.9 (49.8)	13.5 (56.3)	17.5 (63.5)	19.9 (67.8)	22.2 (72.0)	22.1 (71.8)	18.9 (66.0)	14.7 (58.5)	9.9 (49.8)	6.6 (43.9)	14.0 (57.2)
Daily mean °C (°F)	3.6 (38.5)	3.7 (38.7)	6.4 (43.5)	9.1 (48.4)	12.9 (55.2)	15.5 (59.9)	17.8 (64.0)	17.6 (63.7)	14.8 (58.6)	11.2 (52.2)	7.3 (45.1)	4.2 (39.6)	10.4 (50.7)
Mean daily minimum °C (°F)	0.8 (33.4)	0.5 (32.9)	2.6 (36.7)	4.3 (39.7)	7.8 (46.0)	10.6 (51.1)	13.1 (55.6)	12.8 (55.0)	10.6 (51.1)	7.5 (45.5)	4.2 (39.6)	1.4 (34.5)	6.4 (43.5)
Record low °C (°F)	−17.1 (1.2)	−13.8 (7.2)	−11.4 (11.5)	−6.0 (21.2)	−1.4 (29.5)	0.5 (32.9)	3.6 (38.5)	4.6 (40.3)	0.4 (32.7)	−5.1 (22.8)	−7.5 (18.5)	−13.3 (8.1)	−17.1 (1.2)
Average precipitation mm (inches)	69.4 (2.73)	57.9 (2.28)	64.9 (2.56)	42.6 (1.68)	58.3 (2.30)	65.2 (2.57)	74.0 (2.91)	81.0 (3.19)	87.1 (3.43)	90.1 (3.55)	87.1 (3.43)	78.3 (3.08)	855.6 (33.69)
Average precipitation days (≥ 1 mm)	12	10	12	9	9	10	10	10	12	12	13	13	131
Average snowy days	6	5	4	2	0	0	0	0	0	0	2	4	22
Average relative humidity (%)	88	85	83	78	77	79	79	80	84	86	89	89	83
Mean monthly sunshine hours	62.5	83.8	124.0	174.9	213.9	203.6	213.1	196.6	137.6	106.9	60.4	46.7	1,623.8
Source 1: Royal Netherlands Meteorological Institute (1981–2010 normals, snowy days normals for 1971–2000)
Source 2: Royal Netherlands Meteorological Institute (1971–2000 extremes)

=== Nature ===
In 1934 Zuid-Hollands Landschap was founded as the nature conservation organisation in the province. As of 2023 South Holland is covered for 12.7% in half-natural ecosystems.

=== Subdivisions and municipalities ===
South Holland is divided into 50 municipalities.

==== Northern South Holland ====
The province's northern subregions correspond to the broadcast area of Omroep West.

- Haaglanden
  - Delft
  - Leidschendam-Voorburg
  - Midden-Delfland
  - Pijnacker-Nootdorp
  - Rijswijk
  - The Hague
  - Wassenaar
  - Westland
  - Zoetermeer
- Hollands Midden
  - Alphen aan den Rijn
  - Bodegraven-Reeuwijk
  - Gouda
  - Hillegom
  - Kaag en Braassem
  - Katwijk
  - Krimpenerwaard
  - Leiden
  - Leiderdorp
  - Lisse
  - Nieuwkoop
  - Noordwijk
  - Oegstgeest
  - Teylingen
  - Voorschoten
  - Waddinxveen
  - Zoeterwoude
  - Zuidplas

==== Southern South Holland ====
The province's southern subregions correspond to the broadcast area of RTV Rijnmond.

- Rijnmond
  - Albrandswaard
  - Barendrecht
  - Capelle aan den IJssel
  - Goeree-Overflakkee
  - Hoeksche Waard
  - Krimpen aan den IJssel
  - Lansingerland
  - Maassluis
  - Nissewaard
  - Ridderkerk
  - Rotterdam
  - Schiedam
  - Vlaardingen
  - Voorne aan Zee
- Southeastern South Holland
  - Alblasserdam
  - Dordrecht
  - Gorinchem
  - Hardinxveld-Giessendam
  - Hendrik-Ido-Ambacht
  - Molenlanden
  - Papendrecht
  - Sliedrecht
  - Zwijndrecht

== Economy ==
The Gross domestic product (GDP) of the region was 163.8 billion € in 2018. This contributes to the gross domestic product of the Netherlands by 21.2%. GDP per capita adjusted for purchasing power was 38,700 € or 128% of the EU27 average in the same year. South Holland's labour force amounts to 1,661,000 people; 47.1% of the total population. The unemployment rate is 6.1% in 2013.

The main sectors of economical activity in this province are among others:

- Horticulture is an important sector in South Holland. The province is home to around 2550 glasshouse companies, approximately half of the Netherlands' total. Specifically the Westland is well known for its intensive horticulture. The glasshouses in this region cover an area of 2,750 hectares (10.6 sq mi), making it the world's largest contiguous greenhouse area.
- Flower bulb cultivation;
- Port of Rotterdam;
- Petrochemical industry, particularly near Rotterdam neighbourhood Pernis; (Shell's refinery there is the largest oil refinery in Europe, and one of the largest in the world);
- The service-oriented economy of The Hague, where many jobs are offered by the national government (of which the main administrative parts are settled in this town), international institutions and headquarters of several large international businesses;
- Tourism-related activities (among others in historic places like Delft, and several seaside resorts);
- Commercial fishing; main South Holland fishing places are Katwijk and Scheveningen;
- Stockbreeding, of which in this province dairy industry is the main sector.
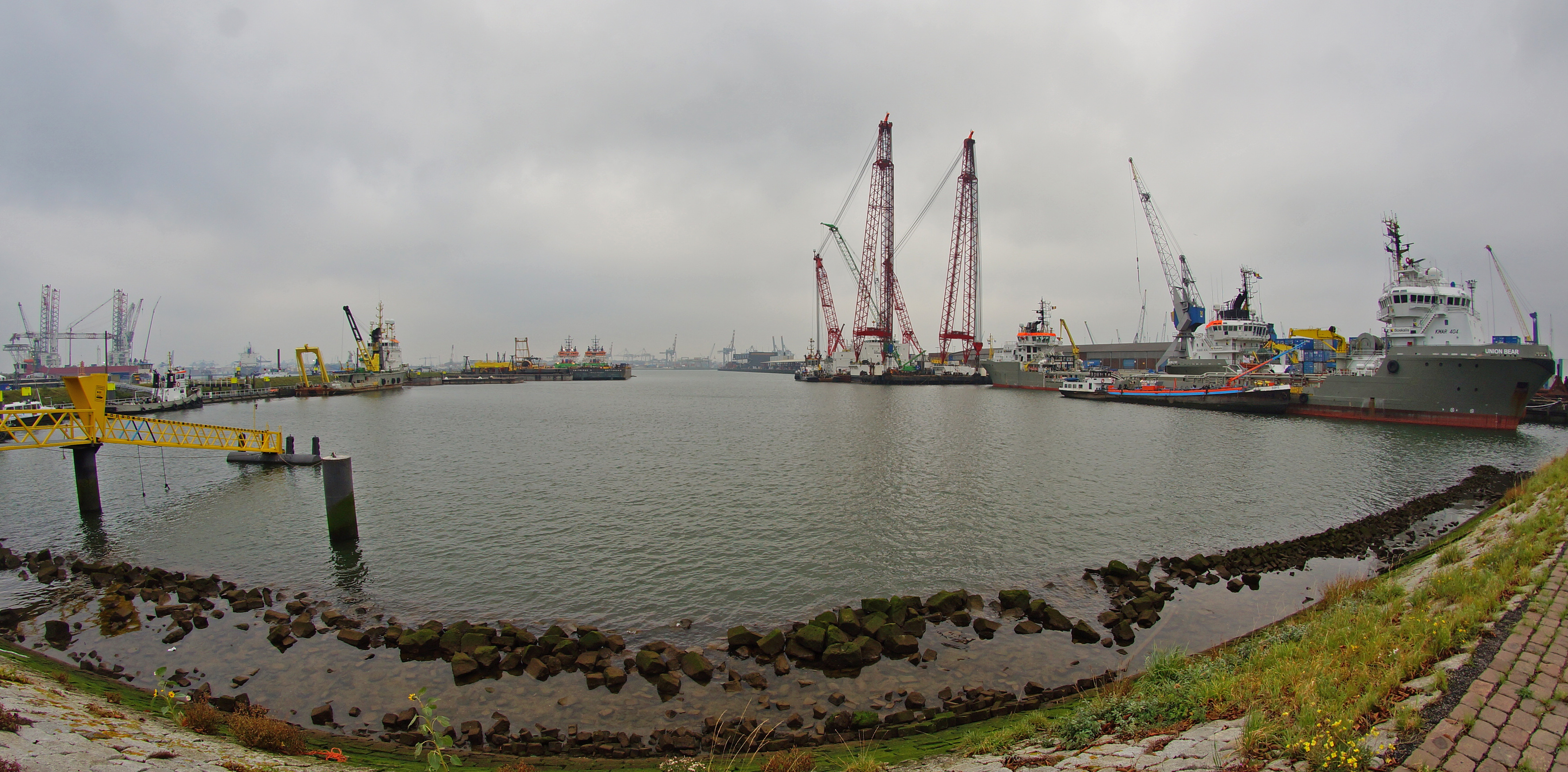
Waalhaven in the Port of Rotterdam

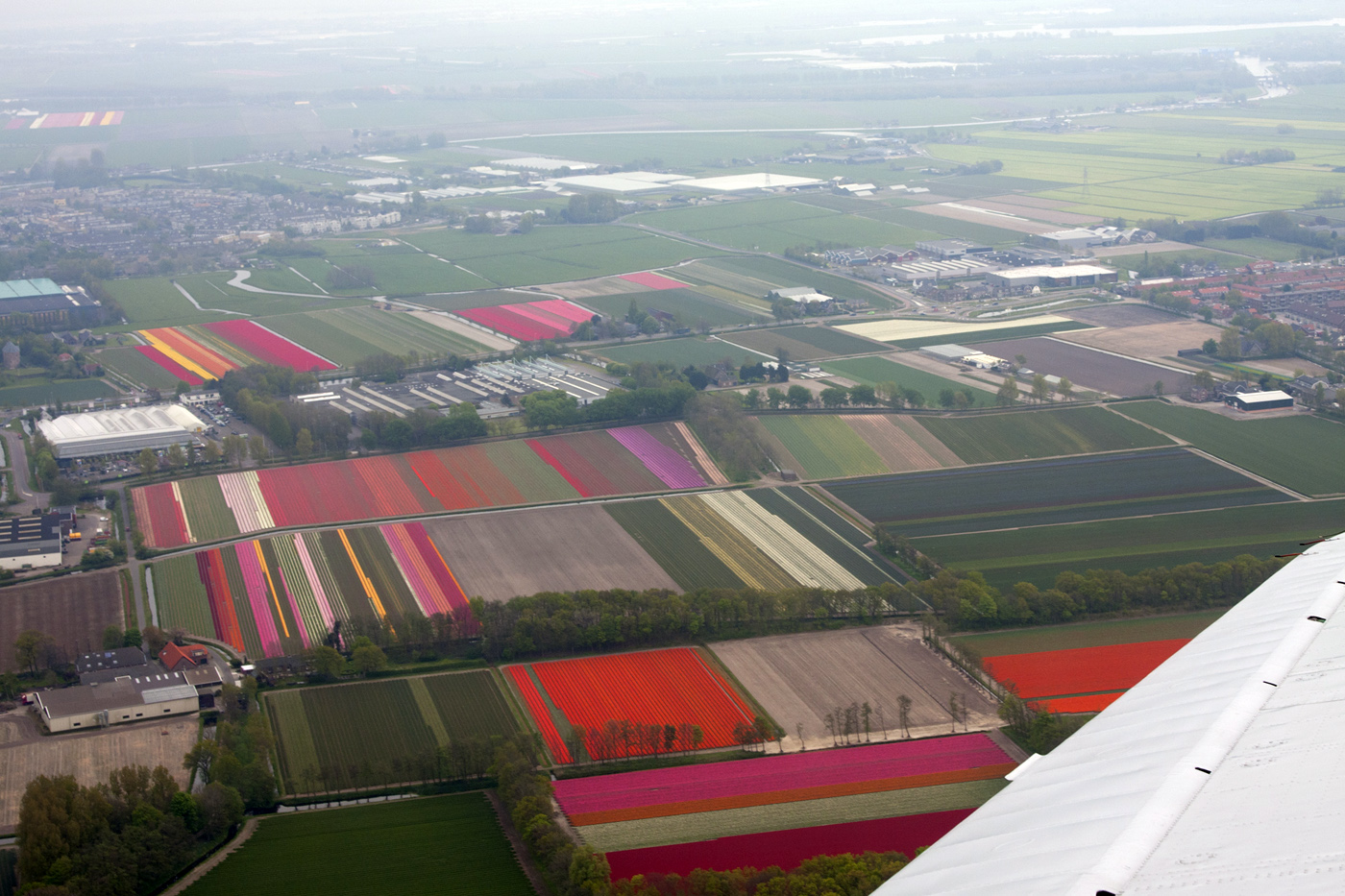
Flower fields near Lisse

Drone footage of flower fields near De Zilk

== Religion ==
Religion in South Holland (2015)
1. Not religious (52.2%)
2. Protestant Church in the Netherlands (18.2%)
3. Catholicism (14.5%)
4. Islam (7.50%)
5. Hinduism (1.80%)
6. Other (5.70%)

In 2015, 18.2% of the population belonged to the Protestant Church in the Netherlands while 16.5% were Roman Catholic, 7.5% Muslim, 1.8% Hindu, and 5.7% belonged to other churches or faiths. Over half (50.2%) of the population identified as non-religious.

== Notable residents ==
Among the well-known scientists originating from South Holland are:

- Christiaan Huygens (1629–1695), mathematician, physicist, astronomer and inventor
- Antonie van Leeuwenhoek (1632–1723), father of microbiology and developer of the microscope
- Desiderius Erasmus (1466–1536), philosopher and humanist

Several prominent painters originate from this province, including:

- Rembrandt (Leiden)
- Jan Steen (Leiden)
- Johannes Vermeer (Delft)

== See also ==
- List of cities, towns and villages in South Holland
- Politics of South Holland
