= Christiaan Brunings =

Dutch hydraulic engineer (1736–1805)

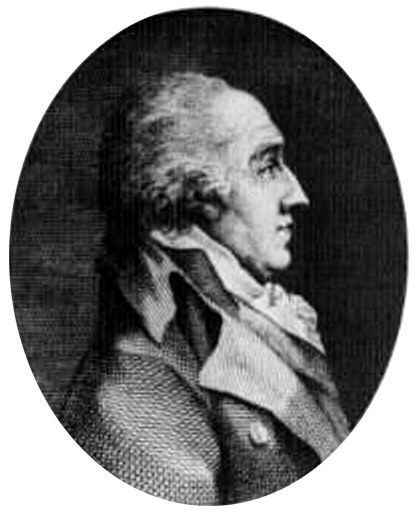
Christiaan Brunings

Christiaan Brunings (Mannheim-Neckarau, 3 November 1736 – The Hague, 16 May 1805) was a Dutch hydraulic engineer.

== Early life ==
Brunings was the son of a preacher in Mannheim-Neckarau in Germany. After high school he attended the University of Heidelberg. He had to break off his studies for lack of money and found work in the vinegar works of his brother in the Netherlands. Here he met Jan Noppen (1706-1764), superintendent of the Hoogheemraadschap van Rijnland (Rijnland Water Board). He was Brunings' mentor and taught him music, mathematics, physics, astronomy and engineering. After the death of Noppen, Brunings succeeded him on 25 May 1765 in his function.

== Work ==
In 1769 Brunings became Inspector General of the Government Rivers, giving more attention to water management of the upper rivers. In 1798 he was appointed head of the Bureau voor den Waterstaat (Office of Public Works), the forerunner of the Rijkswaterstaat. Brunings spent more than thirty years as head of Dutch public works, from 1800 as Inspector-General of the Public Works of the Batavian Republic; from 1803 as Director of the country's river and sea works.

Brunings played an important role in the negotiations between Frederick the Great, King in Prussia, and the provinces of Holland and Gelderland on the distribution of water from the Rhine in the Waal, Lower Rhine and IJssel. After 22 years of negotiations a treaty was signed in 1771 on the Rhine water distribution, which meant a first step in international water management consulting business. He was also involved in improving the dikes along the Rhine to help prevent damaging floods.

Brunings is also known for the invention of an instrument for measuring water flow. In 1789 he published a detailed practical treatise on river flow including an account of his and other water-flow meters. In his house, "Zwanenburg", in Halfweg he conducted meteorological observations, following a tradition established by Noppen.

== Legacy ==
The significance of Brunings for the development of Dutch water management is clear from his tomb in Sint-Bavokerk in Haarlem, "Nederlands Raad en Beschermer tegen de Woede der Zee en der Stormen" ("Dutch counsel and protector against the anger of the sea and storms"), a statement of his disciple and successor, Frederik Willem Conrad, who published the first biography of him in 1827.

In 1900 a new steam icebreaker for the Rijkswaterstaat was named after him. The SS Christian Brunings has since 1968 been part of the collection of museum ships belonging to the Nederlands Scheepvaartmuseum in Amsterdam.
