= Dutch units of measurement =

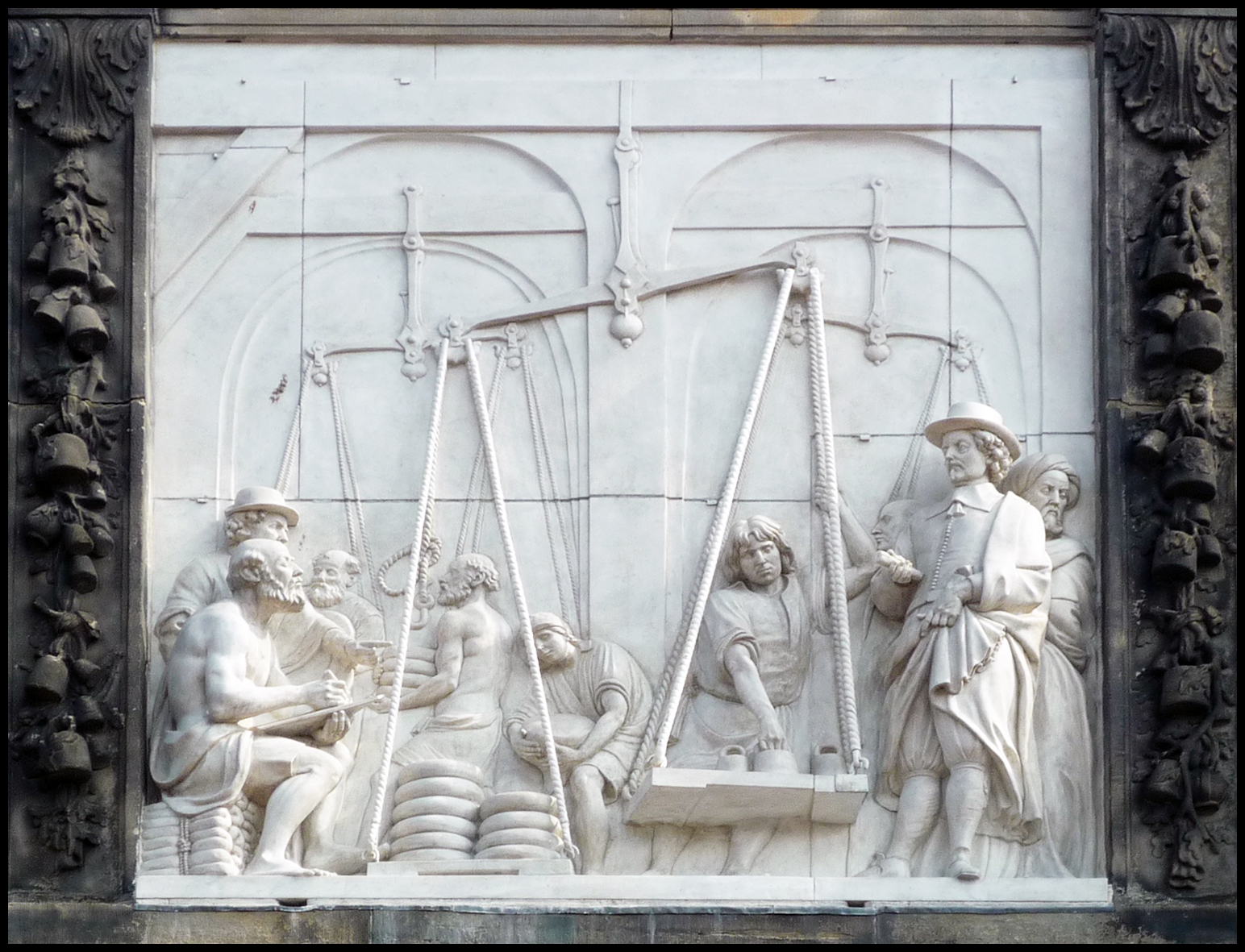
Relief on De Waag, Gouda made by Bartholomeus Eggers in 1668

The Dutch units of measurement used today are those of the metric system. Before the 19th century, a wide variety of different weights and measures were used by the various Dutch towns and provinces. Despite the country's small size, there was a lack of uniformity. During the Dutch Golden Age, these weights and measures accompanied the Dutch to the farthest corners of their colonial empire, including South Africa, New Amsterdam and the Dutch East Indies. Units of weight included the pond, ons and last. There was also an apothecaries' system of weights. The mijl and roede were measurements of distance. Smaller distances were measured in units based on parts of the body – the el, the voet, the palm and the duim. Area was measured by the morgen, hont, roede and voet. Units of volume included the okshoofd, aam, anker, stoop, and mingel. At the start of the 19th century the Dutch adopted a unified metric system. It was based on a modified version of the metric system, different from the system used today. In 1869, this was realigned with the international metric system. These old units of measurement have disappeared, but they remain a colourful legacy of the Netherlands' maritime and commercial importance. The old units of measurement survive today in a number of Dutch sayings and expressions.

== Historical units of measure ==
When Charlemagne was crowned Holy Roman Emperor in 800 AD, his empire included most of modern-day Western Europe including the Netherlands and Belgium. Charlemagne introduced a standard system of measurement across his domains using names such as "pound" and "foot". At the Treaty of Verdun, the empire was divided between Charlemagne's three grandsons. Lothair received the central portion, stretching from the Netherlands in the north to Burgundy and Provence in the south.

Further fragmentation followed and with it various parts of the empire modified the units of measures in a manner that suited the local lord. By the start of the religious wars, the territories that made up the Netherlands, still part of the Holy Roman Empire, had passed into the lordship of the King of Spain. Each territory had its own variant of the original Carolingian units of measure. Under the Treaty of Westphalia in 1648, the seven Protestant territories that owed a nominal allegiance to the Prince of Orange seceded from the Holy Roman Empire and established their own confederacy but each kept its own system of measures.

=== Weight ===
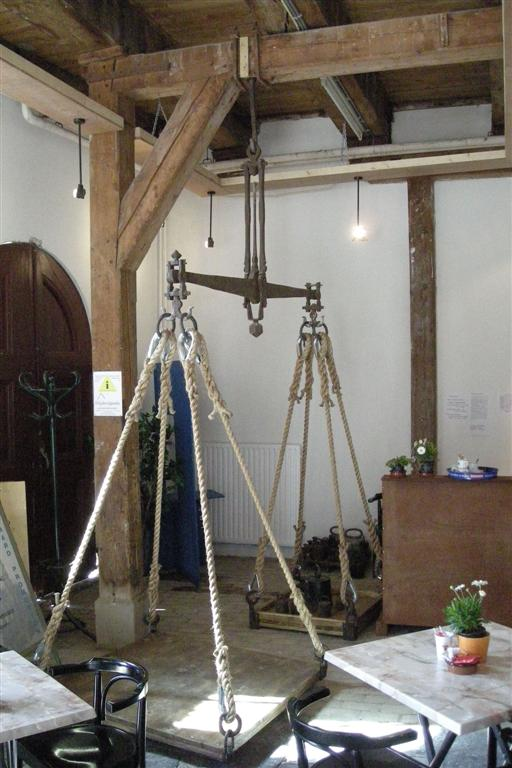
Scales at the town hall (and former weighhouse) in Bolsward

==== Pond ====
- pond (pound) (Amsterdam) – 494.09 g (1.0893 lb) (with variations, now 500 g)
A pond was divided into sixteen ons. A pond was roughly about the same size as a modern pound. It was generally around 480 grams, but there was much variation from region to region. The most commonly used measure of weight was the Amsterdam pound.

- one Amsterdam pound (scale weight) (Amsterdams pond – waaggewicht) was 494.09 grams,
- one Gorinchem pound (Gorinchems pond) was 466 grams,
- one Utrecht heavy pound (Utrechts zwaar pond) was 497.8 grams.

After the metric system was introduced in 1816, the word pond continued to be used, but for 1 kilogram. This doubling in size of the pond in one fell swoop created a good deal of confusion. The name "kilogram" was adopted in 1869, but the pond was only eliminated as a formal unit of measurement in 1937. Pond is still used today in everyday parlance to refer to 500 g, not far from its historical weight. The word pond is also used when referring to the pound used in English-speaking countries.

==== Ons ====
- ons, once (ounce) – 1/16 pond = 30.881 g (1.0893 oz) (with variations, now 100 g)

An ons was 1/16 of a pond. An ons was generally around 30 grams, but there was much variation. The figures provided above for the weight of the various pounds used in the Netherlands can be divided by 16 to obtain the weights of the various ounces in use. After the metric system was introduced, the word ons continued to be used, but for 100 g. The ons was eliminated as a formal unit of measurement in 1937, but it is still used today in everyday parlance to refer to 100 g. In the Netherlands today the word ons does not commonly refer to its historical weight of around 30 g (the exact weight depending on where you were), but to 100 g.

==== Last or Scheepslast ====
- scheepslast – 4,000 Amsterdam pond = 1,976.4 kg (2.1786 short tons; 1.9452 long tons)
Meaning literally a "load", a last was essentially the equivalent of 120 cubic feet (3.398 m^{3}) of shipping space. A last in the Dutch East India Company (VOC) in the 17th century was about the same as 1,250 kg, becoming later as much as 2,000 kg.

In the Dutch fishery, a last was a measurement of the fish loaded into the various types of fishing boat in use (e.g. a bomschuit, buis, sloep or logger). The last of these could take 35 to 40 last of fish, the exact amount depending on the location. In the South Holland fishing villages of Scheveningen and Katwijk, it amounted to 17 crans (kantjes) of herring; in Vlaardingen 14 packed tons. A cran (kantje) held about 900 to 1,000 herring. In Flanders a last was about 1,000 kg of herring. The term fell out of use when the herring fishery disappeared.

==== Apothecaries' system ====
In the Netherlands (as in English-speaking countries) there was an apothecaries' system of weights.

Unit	Symbol	Division	Grains	Grams
medicinal pound (medicinaal pond)	lb	12 ons	5760	373.241 72
medicinal ounce (medicinaal ons)	℥	8 drachmen	480	31.103 477
dram (drachme)	ℨ	3 scrupels	60	3.887 9346
scruple (scrupel)	℈	20 grein	20	1.295 9782
grain (grein)	gr.		1	0.064 79891

=== Length ===
==== Mijl ====
- one Dutch mile or mijl (mijl) = about 5.5–6.25 kilometre.

The usual Hollandse or Nederlandse mijl was actually the league, the Celtic unit of distance notionally equivalent to an hour's walk (één uur gaans), varying over different terrain. This was usually standardized at the value of 20,000 feet, although the foot varied over time and from region to region. The Amsterdam foot produced a mijl of around 3.52 miles or 5.66 km, while the Rhenish foot produced one of 3.9 miles or 6.28 km.

In specific contexts, a separate mile might be used. Sailors used a nautical or geographical mile (geografische mijl) based on varying divisions of an equatorial degree. The traditional version was identical to the German and Scandinavian nautical mile of 4 minutes of arc—1/15 of an equatorial degree—or about 7.4 km. Some, however, used the Portuguese maritime league (Portuguese: légua de 20 ao grau) of 1/20 of a degree or about 5.56 km. The "Netherlands mile" was also used as a direct synonym for the kilometer between the beginning of Dutch metrification in 1816 and the completion of the reforms in 1869. (Within Dutch, the word mijl has now fallen out of use except in fixed expressions and references to English and international nautical units.)

==== Roede ====
The roede (literally, "rod") was generally somewhat smaller than the English rod, which is 16.5 feet (or 5.0292 metres). However, the length of a roede, and the number of voeten in a roede, varied from place to place. There could be anywhere from 7 to 21 voeten in a roede. The roede used in the Netherlands for the measurement of long distances was generally the Rijnland rod. Other rods included:

- one Rijnland rod (Rijnlandse roede) (= 12 Rijnland feet) was 3.767 m
- one Amsterdam rod (Amsterdamse roede) (= 13 Amsterdam feet) was 3.68 m
- one Bloois rod (Blooise roede) (= 12 feet) was 3.612 m
- one 's-Hertogenbosch rod ('s-Hertogenbosche roede) (= 20 feet) was 5.75 m
- one Hondsbos and Rijp rod (Hondsbosse en Rijp roede) was 3.42 m
- one Putten rod (Puttense roede) (= 14 feet) was 4.056 m
- one Schouw rod (Schouwse roede) (= 12 feet) was 3.729 m
- one Kings rod (in Friesland) (Konings roede) (= 12 feet) was 3.913 m
- one Gelderland rod (Geldersche roede) (= 14 feet) was 3.807 m

Today the word roede is not in common use in the Netherlands as a unit of measurement.

==== El ====
The length represented by the Dutch ell was the distance of the inside of the arm (i.e. the distance from the armpit to the tip of the fingers), an easy way to measure length. The Dutch "ell", which varied from town to town (55–75 cm), was somewhat shorter than the English ell (114.3 cm). A section of measurements is given below:

- one The Hague ell or standard ell (Haagse of gewone el) = 69.425 cm
- one Amsterdam ell (Amsterdamse el) = 68.78 cm
- one Brabant ell (Brabantse el) = 69.2 cm or 16 tailles
- one Delft ell (Delfsche el) = 68.2 cm
- one Goes ell (Goesche el) = 69 cm
- one Twente ell (Twentse el) = 58.7 cm

In 1725 The Hague ell was fixed as the national standard for tax purposes and from 1816 to 1869, the word el was used in the Netherlands to refer to the metre. In 1869 the word meter was adopted and the el, disappeared, both as a word and as a unit of measurement.

==== Voet ====
The voet ("foot") was of the same order of magnitude as the English foot (30.48 cm), but its exact size varied from city to city and from province to province. There were 10, 11, 12 or 13 duimen (inches) in a voet, depending on the city's local regulations. The Rijnland foot which had been in use since 1621 was most commonly used voet in the both Netherlands and in parts of Germany. In 1807, de Gelder measured the copy of the Rijnland foot in the Leiden observatory to be 0.3139465 m while Eytelwien found that the master copy that was in use in Germany was 0.313853543 m – a difference of 0.03%. In the seventeenth and eighteenth centuries Dutch settlers took the Rijnland foot to the Cape Colony. In 1859, by which time the colony had passed into British control, the Cape foot was calibrated against the English foot and legally defined as 1.033 English feet (0.314858 m).

The following is a partial list of the various voeten in use the Netherlands:

- one Rijnland foot (Rijnlandse voet) (= 12 Rijnland inches) was 31.4 cm
- one Amsterdam foot (Amsterdamse voet) (= 11 Amsterdam inches) was 28.3133 cm
- one Bloois foot (Blooise voet) was 30.1 cm
- one 's-Hertogenbosch foot ('s-Hertogenbossche voet) was 28.7 cm
- one Hondsbos and Rijp foot (Honsbossche en Rijpse voet) was 28.5 cm
- one Schouw foot (Schouwse voet) was 31.1 cm
- one Gelderland foot (Geldersche voet) was 29.2 cm

Today the word voet is not in common use in the Netherlands as a unit of measurement, except when referring to the English foot.

==== Palm ====
- kleine palm (small palm) – 3 cm (1.18 in)

- grote palm (large palm) – 9.6 cm; after 1820, 10 cm

==== Duim ====
The duim (nl) ("thumb", but translated as "inch") was about the width of the top phalanx of the thumb of an adult man. It was very similar to the length of the English inch (2.54 cm). Its exact length and definition varied from region to region, but was usually one-twelfth of a voet, though the Amsterdamse duim was one eleventh of an Amsterdamse voet.

- one Amsterdam inch (Amsterdamse duim) was 2.57393 cm
- one Gelderland or Nijmegen inch (Gelderse of Nijmeegse duim) was 2.7 cm
- one Rijnland inch (Rijnlandse duim) was 2.61 cm

When the "Dutch metric system" (Nederlands metriek stelsel) was introduced in 1820 the word duim was used for the centimeter, but in 1870 was dropped. Today the word duim is not in common use in the Netherlands as a unit of measurement except when referring to the English inch. The word is still used in certain expressions such as "drieduims pijp" (three-inch pipe) and "duimstok" (ruler or gauge).

=== Area ===
Morgen

- morgen was 8,516 square metres (with variations).

"Morgen" is Dutch for "morning". A morgen of land represented the amount of land that could be ploughed in a morning. The exact size varied from region to region. The number of roede in a morgen also varied from place to place, and could be anywhere from 150 to 900.

- one Rijnland morgen (Rijnlandse morgen) = 8,516 square metres (Divided into 6 honts. A hont was divided into 100 square Rijnland rods. So there were 600 Rijnland rods in a morgen. A Rijnland rod was divided into 144 square Rijnland feet.)
- one Bilt morgen (Biltse morgen) = 9,200 square metres
- one Gelderland morgen (Gelderse morgen) = 8,600 square metres
- one Gooi morgen (Gooise morgen) = 9,800 square metres
- one 's-Hertogenbosch morgen (Bossche morgen) = 9,930 square metres (Divided into 6 loopense = 600 square roede = 240,000 square feet.)
- one Veluwe morgen (Veluwse morgen) = 9,300 square metres
- one Waterland morgen (Waterlandse morgen) = 10,700 square metres
- one Zijp or Schermer morgen (Zijper of Schermer morgen) = 8,516 square metres

During the French occupation, measurements were standardised and regional variations eliminated. Initially, the Napoleonic king Louis Napoleon decreed in 1806 that the Rijnland morgen would be used throughout the country, but this only lasted a few years. It wasn't long before the metric system was introduced. Since then land has been measured in square metres (hectares, ares and centiares).

Hont

A hont consisted of 100 roede.The exact size of a hont of land varied from place to place, but the Rijnland hont was 1,400 square metres. Another name for hont was "honderd", a Dutch word meaning "hundred". The word hond is derived from the earlier Germanic word hunda, which meant "hundred" (or "dog"). After the metric system was introduced in the 19th century, the measurement fell into disuse.

Roede

A square roede was also referred to as a roede. Roede (or roe) was both an area measurement as well as a linear measurement. The exact size of a roede depended on the length of the local roede, which varied from place to place. The most common roede used in the Netherlands was the Rijnland rod.

- one Rijnland rod (Rijnlandse roede) was 14.19 m^{2}
- one Amsterdam rod (Amsterdamse roede) was 13.52 m^{2}
- one 's-Hertogenbosch rod (Bossche roede) was 33.1 m^{2}
- one Breda rod (Bredase roede) was 32.26 m^{2}
- one Groningen rod (Groningse roede) was 16.72 m^{2}
- one Hondsbos rod (Hondsbosse roede) was 11.71 m^{2}

When the Dutch metric system (Nederlands metriek stelsel) was introduced in 1816, the old names were used for the new metric measures. An are was referred to as a "square rod" (vierkante roede). The rod and the square rod were abandoned by 1937, but the Rijnland rod (Rijnlandse Roede), abbreviated as "RR^{2}", is still used as a measurement of surface area for flowerbulb fields.

Voet

- Rijnlandse voet (Rijnland square foot) – 0.098596 m^{2} (1.0163 sq ft)
- Hertogenbossche voet ('s-Hertogenbosch square foot) – 0.082369 m^{2} (0.8866 sq ft)

A square voet was also called a voet. The word voet (meaning "foot") could refer to a foot or to a square foot. The exact size of a voet depended on the length of the local voet, which changed from region to region. The most commonly used voet in the Netherlands was the Rijnland foot.

=== Volume ===
The Dutch measures of volume, as with all other measures, varied from locality to locality. The modern-day equivalents are therefore only approximate and equating litres with quarts will not unduly distort the results (1 litre = 1.057 US quarts = 0.880 UK quarts)

Okshoofd

- okshoofd (oxhead) – 6 ankers = 232 litres

A okshoofd (earlier spelling: oxhoofd) was a measurement of volume representing the volume held by a large barrel of wine. The measurement was also used for vinegar, tobacco and sugar. The measurement is still used by businesses in the wine and spirits trade. There were six ankers in an okshoofd.

There is a saying in Dutch: "You can't draw clean wine from an unclean oxhead". (Men kan geen reine wijn uit een onrein okshoofd tappen.)

Aam

- aam – 4 ankers = 155 litres

There were four ankers in an aam. It was used for measuring the volume of wine. The size of an aam varied from place to place. It was anything from 141 to 160 litres.

Anker

- anker (anchor) = approximately 38.75 litres
An anker was a measure of volume representing the volume held in a small cask holding around 45 bottles.

Stoop

- stoop – 1/16 anker = 2.4 litres

Mingel

- mingel – 1/2 stoop = approximately 1.21 litres

== Dutch metric system ==
In 1792, the southern part of the Netherlands was incorporated into the French First Republic, and in 1807, the rest of the Netherlands was incorporated into what had now become the First French Empire and as a result the Netherlands was forced to accept the French units of measurement. In 1812, France replaced the original metric system with the mesures usuelles.

Under the Congress of Vienna in 1815, the Kingdom of the Netherlands which included Belgium and Luxembourg was established as a buffer state against France. Under the Royal decree of 27 March 1817 (Koningklijk besluit van den 27 Maart 1817), the newly formed Kingdom of the Netherlands abandoned the mesures usuelles in favour of the "Dutch" metric system (Nederlands metrisch stelsel) in which metric units were given the names of units of measure that were then in use. Examples include:

=== Length ===
1 mijl (mile) = 1 kilometre (1 statute mile = 1.609 km)
1 roede (rood) = 10 metres
1 el (ell) = 1 metre (1 English ell of 45 in = 1.143 m)
1 palm (hand) = 10 centimetres (1 English hand = 10.16 cm)
1 duim (inch) = 1 centimetre (1 inch = 2.54 cm)
1 streep (line) = 1 millimetre (1 English line = 2.12 mm)

=== Area ===
1 bunder = 1 hectare
1 vierkante roede (square rod) = 1 are or 100 m^{2}

=== Volume ===
1 wisse or teerling el = 1 cubic metre.
1 mud (bushel) = 100 litres
1 kop (cup) = 1 litre (1 Australian cup = 250 ml)
1 maatje (small measure) = 100 millilitres
1 vingerhoed (thimble) = 10 millilitres

=== Weight ===
1 pond (pound) = 1 kilogram (1 pound avoirdupois = 0.454 kg)

(though in modern colloquial speech, 500 g is also known as a pond.

1 ons (ounce) = 100 grams (1 ounce avoirdupois = 28.35 g)
1 lood (lead) = 10 grams
1 wigtje (small weight) = 1 gram
1 korrel (grain) = 0.1 gram

In 1816, the Netherlands and France were the only countries in the world that were using variations of the metric system. By the late 1860s, the German Zollverein and many other neighbouring countries had adopted the metric system, so in 1869 the modern names were adopted (Wet van 7 April 1869, Staatsblad No.57). A few of the older names remained officially in use, but they were eliminated when the system was further standardised by the 1937 Act on Weights and Measures (IJkwet). Nevertheless, the ons and pond are still used colloquially to always mean respectively 100 grams and 500 grams.

== Modern metric system ==
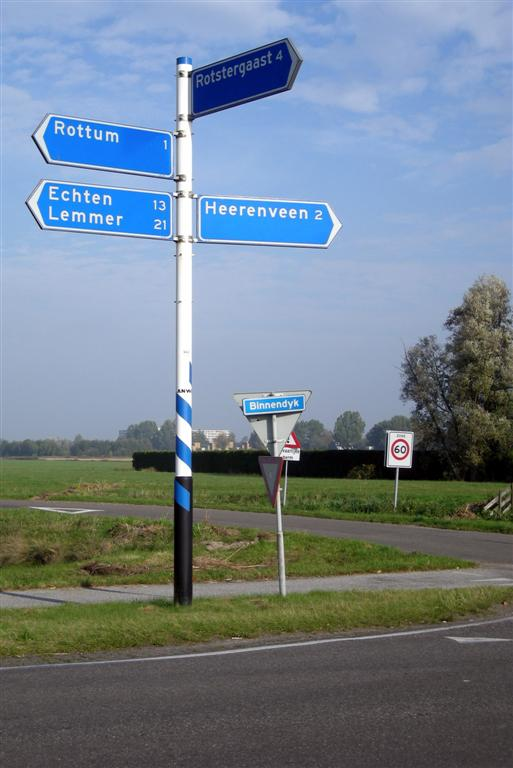
Signposts showing number of kilometres to nearest towns. A roadsign showing the speed limit in kilometres per hour is visible in the middle distance.

Today the Netherlands uses the International system of units (SI).

=== Nomenclature ===
The metric system in the Netherlands has virtually the same nomenclature as in English (to be noted that English got metre from French), except:

- the "-er" spelling is used (e.g. kilometer),
- there is no plural form (e.g. "three metres" is expressed as "drie meter"),
- ton is Dutch for "tonne". Ton is also used to refer to an amount of currency worth 100 thousand.
- a few metric measurements unfamiliar to most English speakers are sometimes used to refer to property measurements (e.g. are and centiare).

=== Standards ===
On 30 October 2006, the Weights and Measures Act was replaced by the Metrology Act. The organisation currently responsible for weights and measures in the Netherlands is a private company called VSL (Van Swinden Laboratories) formerly known as the Nederlands Meetinstituut (NMi). Literally, this means "Dutch Institute of Measures", but the organisation uses its Dutch name in English. The company was created in 1989 when the Metrology Service (Dienst van het IJkwezen) was privatised. At first, the sole shareholder was the Dutch government, but in 2001 the sole shareholder became TNO Bedrijven, a holding company for TNO, the Dutch Organisation for Applied Scientific Research.

== See also ==
- Historical weights and measures
- SI
- Weights and measures
- Kosten unit
