= Kosten =

Kosten may refer to:

== Places ==
- Kościan, in Poland
- Kosten, Bulgaria, a village in Sungurlare municipality, Burgas Province
- Kosteno, Greece

== People ==
- Annabel Kosten (born 1977), Dutch Olympic female swimmer
- Anthony Kosten (born 1958), English-French chess Grandmaster
- Kosten (born 1997), American street photographer, and professional urban explorer

== Other ==
- Kosten (surname), a Dutch surname
- Kosten unit, a Dutch measure for aircraft noise
