= Vecht (Utrecht) =

River in the Netherlands

Coordinates: 52.337°N 5.069°E

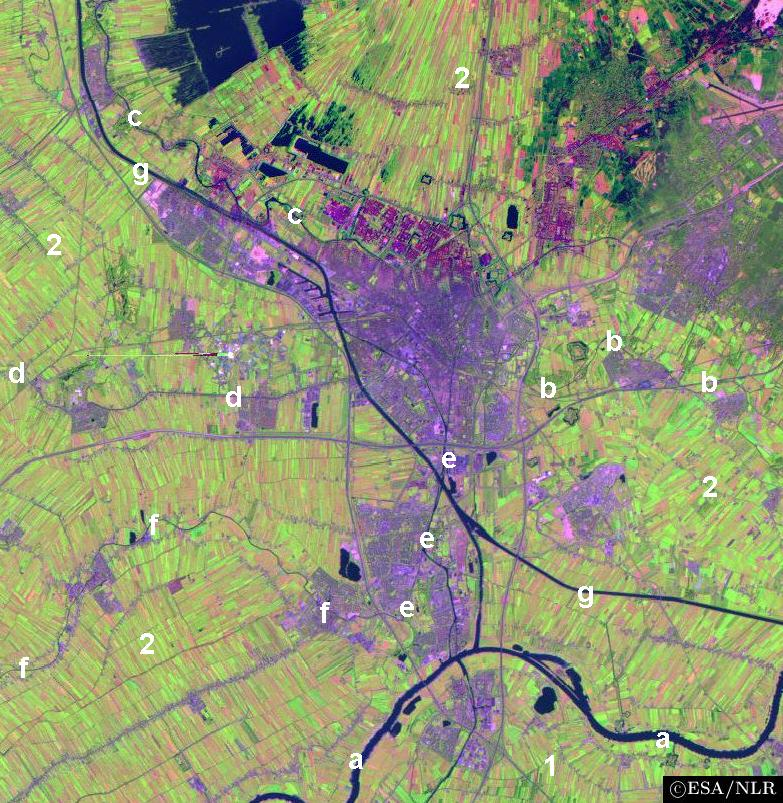
Satellite image of the surroundings of Utrecht showing river Vecht (c) and the Amsterdam-Rhine Canal (g).

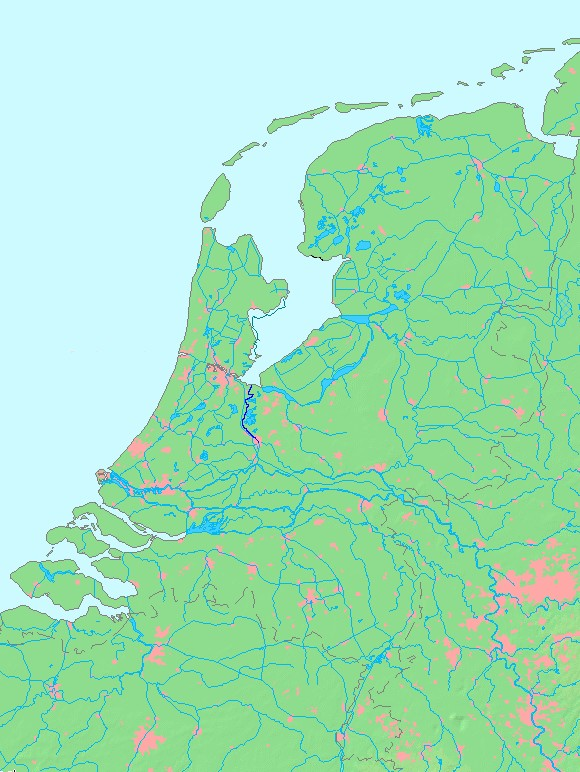
Location of river Vecht (in dark blue).

The Vecht (pronounced [vɛxt]) is a Rhine branch in the Dutch province of Utrecht. It is sometimes called Utrechtse Vecht to avoid confusion with its Overijssel counterpart. The area along the river is called the Vechtstreek.

== Geography ==
The Vecht originates from the city of Utrecht, where the Kromme Rijn stream forks into two branches: the Leidse Rijn/Oude Rijn branch to the west and the Vecht to the north. Originally the Vecht branched off south of the city near the Roman fort Fectio, flowing eastwards around the city, but in the 12th century a northern shortcut was dug out.

The Vecht meanders north past the towns and villages of Maarssen, Breukelen and Nigtevecht, crosses the border into the province of North Holland, passes the city of Weesp and discharges into the IJmeer at Muiden. The Amsterdam-Rhine Canal was dug in the Vecht basin.

The Roman historian Tacitus tells us that in the first century CE a Roman fleet sailed due north down a Rhine branch, then sailed past Lake Flevo into the North Sea. This could have been the IJssel, which the Romans connected to the Rhine themselves, or the river Vecht.

In the 17th and 18th centuries, many country estates, known as buitenplaatsen, were built on the banks of the Vecht by rich merchants and administrators from Amsterdam.
