= OOG (disambiguation) =

OOG or Oog may refer to:

- Groningen, the capital city and main municipality of Groningen province in the Netherlands
- Oog, a town in the Sool region of the North-Eastern State of Somalia
- Oog (comics), a giant alien monster that first appeared in Tales of Suspense #27
- Out Of Gas, life-support emergency during scuba-diving
- Ocean Observation Group, a group that measures and monitors the surface temperature and salinity of the upper 2000 meters of the ocean
- oog, the ISO 639-3 code for Ong, a variant of Ta'Oi language

== See also ==
- Oog in Al, a residential area in the west of the city of Utrecht in the Netherlands
