= Tania Leon =

South African feminist (1945–1996)

- Born: Ruth Naomi Leon; 4 May 1945; Wellington, South Africa
- Died: 15 August 1996 (aged 51); Nigtevecht, Netherlands
- Citizenship: South African; Dutch
- Education: Athlone Institute, Paarl
- Occupations: Teacher; Nurse; Activist
- Years active: 1960s–1980s
- Organization: African National Congress (Dutch unit)
- Known for: Anti-apartheid activism in the Netherlands

Tania Leon, born Ruth Naomi Leon, (Wellington, 4 May 1945 – Nigtevecht, 15 August 1996) was a South African born teacher and women's activist. She was a member of the anti-apartheid movement in the Netherlands and of the Dutch unit of the ANC.

== Biography ==
Leon was born on Friday 4 May 1945 in Wellington, South Africa. She was the youngest child of a family of nine. Leon trained as a teacher and in the academic year 1960–1961 she obtained her "lower primary teacher's certificate" at the Athlone Institute in Paarl, South Africa. From January 1969 to June 1972 she worked as a teaching assistant at the Mountain River High School in Wellington.

In 1973, Leon decided to leave South Africa because the South African government's apartheid policies were becoming more repressive. She arrived in the Netherlands in 1973

Leon pursued a nursing course in Amsterdam from 1973 to 1976 and worked from August 1982 until early 1985 as a district nurse at the Amsterdam Cross Societies. She became a Dutch citizen in 1984,

Leon worked from August 1986 to 1989 at the Foundation for Women and Informatics in Amsterdam, as well as a lecturer at the Women's School of Informatics from August 1987. Leon died on Thursday, 15 August 1996 at the age of 51 in Nigtevecht.
