= Foot (unit) =

Customary unit of length

foot
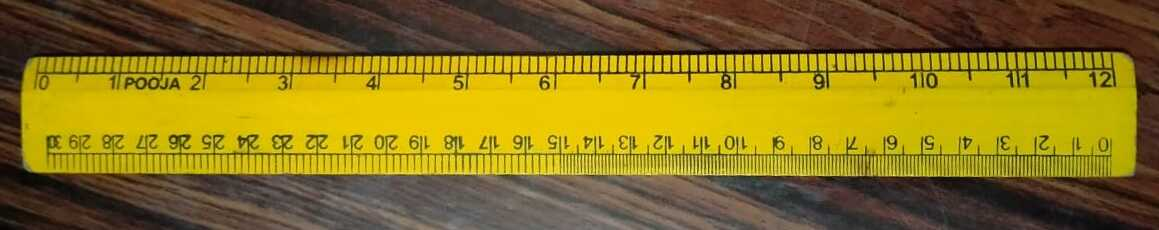
- A foot-long ruler

General information
- Unit system: Imperial; US customary
- Unit of: Length
- Symbol: ft, ′

Conversions
| 1 ft in ... | ... is equal to ... |
- Imperial/US customary: 1/3 yd; 12 in
- Metric (SI) units: 0.3048 m; 30.48 cm; 304.8 mm

The foot (standard symbol: ft) is a unit of length in the British imperial and United States customary systems of measurement. The prime symbol, ′, is commonly used to represent the foot. In both customary and imperial units, one foot comprises 12 inches, and one yard comprises three feet. Since an international agreement in 1959, the foot is exactly 0.3048 meters, by definition. The most common plural of foot is feet. However, the singular form may be used like a plural when it is preceded by a number, as in "that man is six foot tall". Footage is the term used informally for a length expressed in feet.

Historically, the "foot" was a part of many local systems of units, including the Greek, Roman, Chinese, French, and English systems. It varied in length from country to country, from city to city, and sometimes from trade to trade. Its length was usually between 250 mm (9.8 in) and 335 mm (13.2 in) and was generally, but not always, subdivided into twelve inches or 16 digits.

The United States is the only industrialized country that uses the (international) foot in preference to the meter in many but not all commercial, engineering, and standards activities. The foot is legally recognized in the United Kingdom; road distance signs must use imperial units (however, distances on road signs are marked in miles or yards, not feet; bridge clearances are given in meters as well as feet and inches), while its usage is widespread among the British public as a measurement of height. The foot is recognized as an alternative expression of length in Canada. Both the UK and Canada have partially metricated their units of measurement. The measurement of altitude in international aviation (the flight level unit) is one of the few areas where the foot is used outside the English-speaking world.

== Historical origin ==
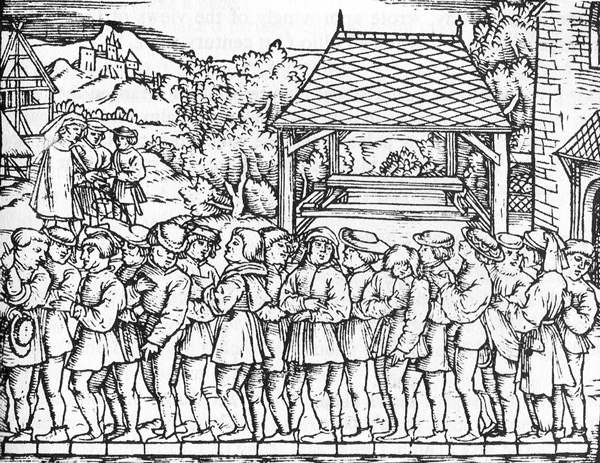
Determination of the rod, using the length of the left foot of 16 randomly chosen people coming from church service. Woodcut published in the book Geometrey by Jakob Köbel (Frankfurt, c. 1535).

Historically, the human body has been used to provide the basis for units of length. The foot of an adult European-American male is typically about 15.3% of his height, giving a person of 175 cm (5 ft 9 in) a foot-length of about 268 mm (10.6 in), on average.

Archaeologists believe that in the past, the people of Egypt, India, and Mesopotamia preferred the cubit, while the people of Rome, Greece, and China preferred the foot. Under the Harappan linear measures, Indus cities during the Bronze Age used a foot of 13.2 inches (335 mm) and a cubit of 20.8 inches (528 mm). The Egyptian equivalent of the foot—a measure of four palms or 16 digits—was known as the djeser and has been reconstructed as about 30 cm (11.8 in).

The Greek foot (πούς, pous) had a length of 1/600 of a stadion, one stadion being about 181.2 m (594 ft); therefore a foot was about 302 mm (11.9 in). Its exact size varied from city to city and could range between 270 mm (10.6 in) and 350 mm (13.8 in), but lengths used for temple construction appear to have been about 295 mm (11.6 in) to 325 mm (12.8 in).

The standard Roman foot (pes) was normally about 295.7 mm (11.6 in), but in some provinces, particularly Germania Inferior, the so-called pes Drusianus (foot of Nero Claudius Drusus) was sometimes used, with a length of about 334 mm (13.1 in). (In reality, this foot predated Drusus.) Originally both the Greeks and the Romans subdivided the foot into 16 digits, but in later years, the Romans also subdivided the foot into 12 unciae (from which both the English words "inch" and "ounce" are derived). After the fall of the Roman Empire, some Roman traditions were continued but others fell into disuse. In 790 Charlemagne attempted to reform the units of measure in his domains. His units of length were based on the toise and in particular the toise de l'Écritoire, the distance between the fingertips of the outstretched arms of a man. The toise has 6 pieds (feet) each of 326.6 mm (12.9 in). He was unsuccessful in introducing a standard unit of length throughout his realm: an analysis of the measurements of Charlieu Abbey shows that during the 9th century the Roman foot of 296.1 mm (11.66 in) was used; when it was rebuilt in the 10th century, a foot of about 320 mm (12.6 in) (Note: The original reference was given in a round number of centimeters.) was used. At the same time, monastic buildings used the Carolingian foot of 340 mm (13.4 in).

The procedure for verification of the foot as described in the 16th century posthumously published work by Jacob Köbel in his book Geometrei. Von künstlichem Feldmessen und absehen is:

Stand at the door of a church on a Sunday and bid 16 men to stop, tall ones and small ones, as they happen to pass out when the service is finished; then make them put their left feet one behind the other, and the length thus obtained shall be a right and lawful rood to measure and survey the land with, and the 16th part of it shall be the right and lawful foot.

=== England and Wales ===
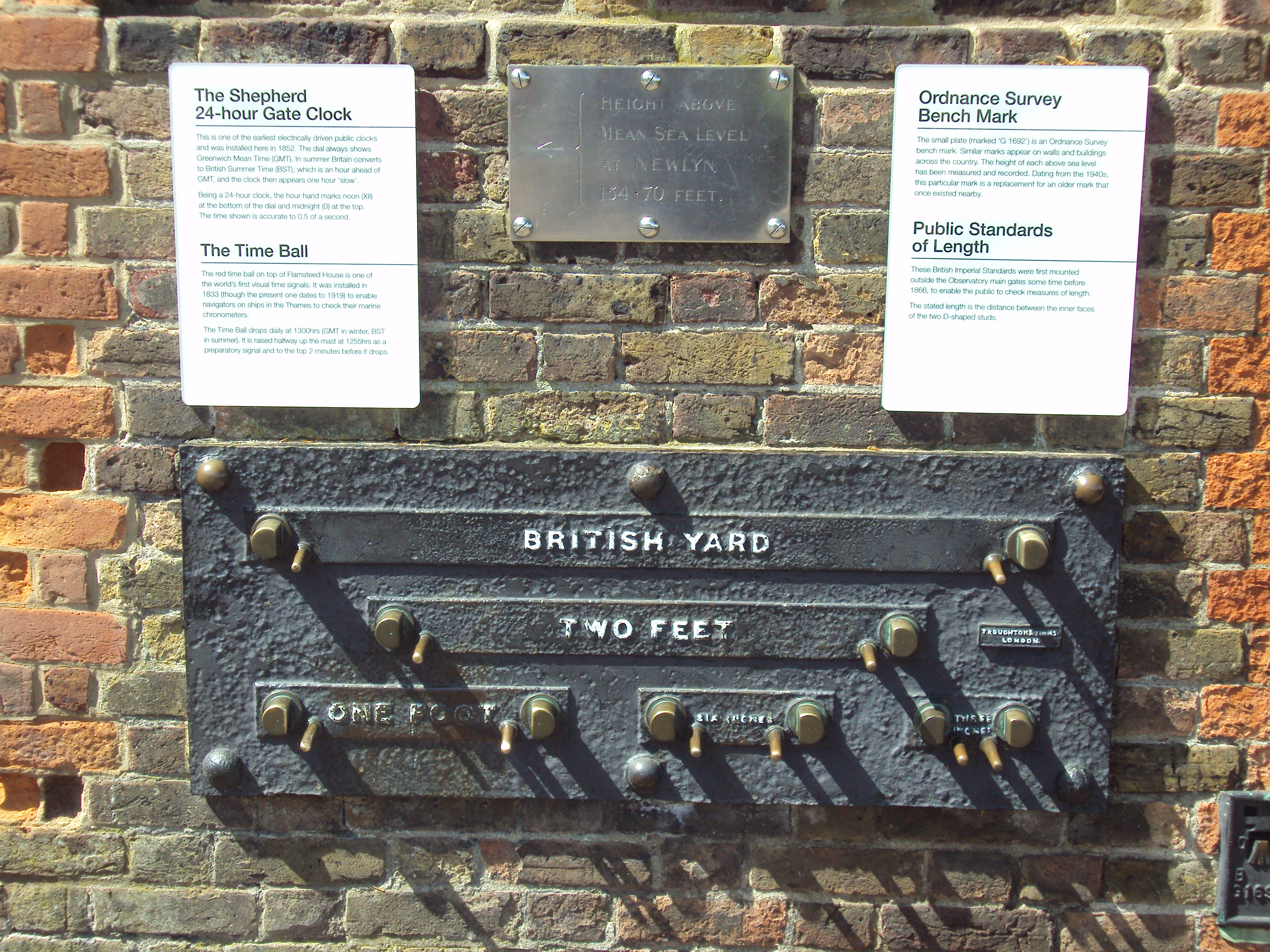
The unofficial public imperial measurement standards erected at the Royal Observatory in Greenwich in the 19th century

The Neolithic long foot, first proposed by archeologists Mike Parker Pearson and Andrew Chamberlain, is based upon calculations from surveys of Phase 1 elements at Stonehenge. They found that the underlying diameters of the stone circles had been consistently laid out using multiples of a base unit amounting to 30 long feet, which they calculated to be 1.056 of a modern international foot (thus 12.672 inches or 0.3219 m). Furthermore, this unit is identifiable in the dimensions of some stone lintels at the site, and in the diameter of the "southern circle" at nearby Durrington Walls. Evidence that this unit was in widespread use across southern Britain is available from the Folkton Drums from Yorkshire (Neolithic artifacts made from chalk with circumferences that exactly divide as integers into ten long feet) and a similar object, the Lavant drum, excavated at Lavant, Sussex, again with a circumference divisible as a whole number into ten long feet.

The measures of Iron Age Britain are uncertain, and proposed reconstructions such as the megalithic yard are controversial. Later Welsh legend credited Dyfnwal Moelmud with the establishment of their units, including a foot of 9 inches. The Belgic or North German foot of 335 mm (13.2 in) was introduced to England either by the Belgic Celts during their invasions prior to the Roman conquest of Britain (AD 43) or by the Anglo-Saxons in the 5th and 6th centuries.

Roman units were introduced following their conquest. After the Roman withdrawal and the Saxon invasions, the Roman foot continued to be used in the construction crafts, while the Belgic foot was used for land measurement. Both the Welsh and Belgic feet seem to have been based on multiples of the barleycorn, but by as early as 950 the English kings seem to have (ineffectually) ordered measures to be based upon an iron yardstick at Winchester and then London. Henry I was said to have ordered a new standard to be based upon the length of his own arm and, by the c. 1300 act concerning the Composition of Yards and Perches traditionally credited to Edward I or Edward II, the statute foot was a different measure, exactly 10/11 of the old (Belgic) foot. The barleycorn, inch, ell, and yard were likewise shrunk, while rods and furlongs remained the same. The ambiguity over the length of the mile was resolved by the 1593 Act against Converting of Great Houses into Several Tenements and for Restraint of Inmates and Inclosures in and near about the City of London and Westminster, which codified the statute mile as comprising 5,280 feet. The 1959 adoption of the international foot completed a redefinition of the foot in terms of the meter.

== Definition ==
=== International foot ===
The international yard and pound agreement of July 1959 defined the length of the international yard in the United States and countries of the Commonwealth of Nations as exactly 0.9144 meters. Consequently, since a foot is one third of a yard, the international foot is defined as exactly 0.3048 meters. This was 2 ppm shorter than the previous US definition and 1.7 ppm longer than the previous British definition. The 1959 agreement concluded a series of step-by-step events, set off in particular by the British Standards Institution's adoption of a scientific standard inch of 25.4 millimeters in 1930.

The Institute of Electrical and Electronics Engineers standard symbol for a foot is "ft". In some cases, the foot is denoted by a prime, often approximated by an apostrophe, and the inch by a double prime; for example, 2 feet 4 inches is sometimes denoted 2′ 4″.

=== Imperial units ===
In Imperial units, the foot was defined as 1/3 yard, with the yard being realized as a physical standard (separate from the standard meter). The yard standards of the different Commonwealth countries were periodically compared with one another. The value of the United Kingdom primary standard of the yard was determined in terms of the meter by the National Physical Laboratory in 1964 to be 0.9143969 m, implying a pre-1959 UK foot of 0.3047990 m. The UK adopted the international yard for all purposes through the Weights and Measures Act 1963, effective January 1, 1964.

=== Survey foot ===
When the international foot was defined in 1959, a great deal of survey data was already available based on the former definitions, especially in the United States and in India. The small difference between the survey foot and the international foot would not be detectable on a survey of a small parcel but becomes significant for mapping or when the state plane coordinate system (SPCS) is used in the US, because the origin of the system may be hundreds of thousands of feet (hundreds of miles) from the point of interest. Hence the previous definitions continued to be used for surveying in the United States and India for many years and are denoted survey feet to distinguish them from the international foot. The United Kingdom was unaffected by this problem, as the retriangulation of Great Britain (1936–62) had been done in meters.

==== United States ====
In the United States, the foot was defined as 12 inches, with the inch being defined by the Mendenhall Order of 1893 via 39.37 inches = 1 m (making a US foot exactly 1200/3937 meters, approximately 0.30480061 m).

On December 31, 2022, the National Institute of Standards and Technology, the National Geodetic Survey, and the United States Department of Commerce deprecated use of the US survey foot and recommended conversion to either the meter or the international foot (0.3048 m). However, the historic relevance of the US survey foot persists, as the Federal Register notes:

The date of December 31, 2022, was selected to accompany the modernization of the National Spatial Reference System (NSRS) by NOAA's National Geodetic Survey (NGS). The reason for associating the deprecation of the U.S. survey foot with the modernization of the NSRS is that the biggest impact of the uniform adoption of the international foot will be for users of the NSRS, due to very large coordinate values currently given in U.S. survey feet in many areas of the U.S. Impacts related to the change to international feet will be minimized if a transition occurs concurrently with others [sic] changes in the NSRS. ...

The difference in timelines will have no effect on users of the existing NSRS (National Spatial Reference System), because NGS (NOAA's National Geodetic Survey) will continue to support the U.S. survey foot for components of the NSRS where it is used now and in the past [emphasis added]. In other words, to minimize disruption in the use of U.S. survey foot for existing NSRS coordinate systems, the change will apply only to the modernized NSRS.

State legislation is also important for determining the conversion factor to be used for everyday land surveying and real estate transactions, although the difference (two ppm) is of no practical significance given the precision of normal surveying measurements over short distances (usually much less than a mile). Out of 50 states and six other jurisdictions, 40 have legislated that surveying measures should be based on the US survey foot, six have legislated that they be made on the basis of the international foot, and ten have not specified.

==== India ====
The Indian survey foot is defined as exactly 0.3047996 m, presumably derived from a measurement of the previous Indian standard of the yard. The current National Topographic Database of the Survey of India is based on the metric WGS-84 datum, which is also used by the Global Positioning System.

== Historical use ==
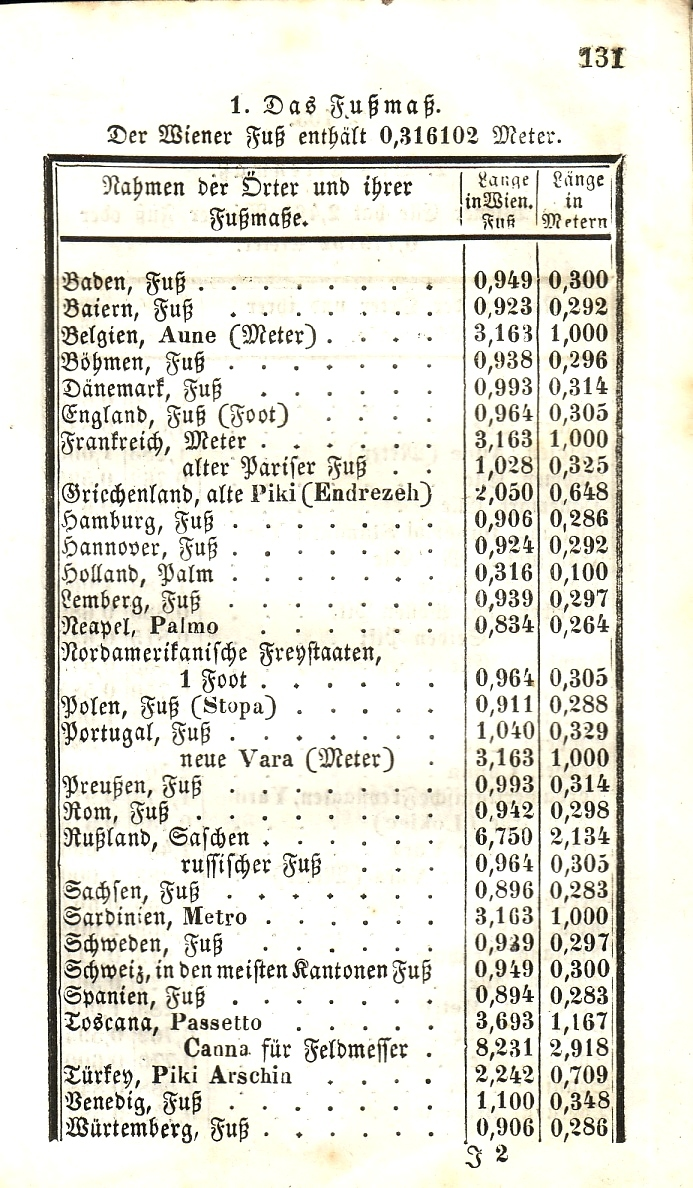
Page from Austrian Lehrbuch des gesammten Rechnens für die vierte Classe der Hauptschulen in den k.k. Staaten of 1848 (transl. Combined mathematics textbook for the fourth form of senior schools in the Imperial–royal states)

=== Metric foot ===
An ISO 2848 measure of 3 basic modules (30 cm) is called a "metric foot", but there were earlier distinct definitions of a metric foot during metrication in France and Germany.

In 1799 the meter became the official unit of length in France. This was not fully enforced, and in 1812 Napoleon introduced the system of mesures usuelles which restored the traditional French measurements in the retail trade, but redefined them in terms of metric units. The foot, or pied métrique, was defined as one third of a meter. This unit continued in use until 1837.

In southwestern Germany in 1806, the Confederation of the Rhine was founded and three different reformed feet were defined, all of which were based on the metric system:

- In Hesse, the Fuß (lit. 'foot') was redefined as 25 cm (9.8 in).
- In Baden, the Fuß was redefined as 30 cm (11.8 in).
- In the Palatinate, the Fuß was redefined as being 33 1/3 cm (13.1 in) (as in France).

=== Other obsolete feet ===
Prior to the introduction of the metric system, many European cities and countries used the foot, but it varied considerably in length: the voet in Ypres, Belgium, was 273.8 mm (10.78 in) while the piede in Venice was 347.73 mm (13.690 in). Lists of conversion factors between the various units of measure were given in many European reference works including:

- Traité, Paris – 1769
- Palaiseau – Bordeaux: 1816
- de Gelder, Amsterdam and The Hague – 1824
- Horace, Brussels – 1840
- Noback & Noback (2 volumes), Leipzig – 1851
- Bruhns, Leipzig – 1881

Many of these standards were peculiar to a particular city, especially in Germany (which, before German unification in 1871, consisted of many kingdoms, principalities, free cities and so on). In many cases the length of the unit was not uniquely fixed: for example, the English foot was stated as 11 pouces 2.6 lignes (French inches and lines) by Picard, 11 pouces 3.11 lignes by Maskelyne, and 11 pouces 3 lignes by D'Alembert.

Most of the various feet in this list ceased to be used when the countries adopted the metric system. The Netherlands and modern Belgium adopted the metric system in 1817, having used the mesures usuelles under Napoleon and the German Empire adopted the metric system in 1871.

The palm (typically 200–280 mm, ie. 7 7/8 to 11 1/32 inches) was used in many Mediterranean cities instead of the foot. Horace Doursther, whose reference was published in Belgium which had the smallest foot measurements, grouped both units together, while J. F. G. Palaiseau devoted three chapters to units of length: one for linear measures (palms and feet); one for cloth measures (ells); and one for distances traveled (miles and leagues).

| Location | Modern country | Local name | Metric equivalent (mm) | Comments |
|---|---|---|---|---|
| Vienna | Austria | Wiener Fuß | 316.102 | |
| Tyrol | Austria | Fuß | 334.12 | |
| Ypres (Ieper) | Belgium | voet | 273.8 | |
| Bruges/Brugge | Belgium | voet | 274.3 | |
| Brussels | Belgium | voet | 275.75 | |
| Hainaut | Belgium | pied | 293.39 | |
| Liège | Belgium | pied | 294.70 | |
| Kortrijk | Belgium | voet | 297.6 | |
| Aalst | Belgium | voet | 277.2 | |
| Mechelen | Belgium | voet | 278.0 | |
| Leuven | Belgium | voet | 285.5 | |
| Tournai | Belgium | pied | 297.77 | |
| Antwerp | Belgium | voet | 286.8 | |
| China | China | tradesman's foot | 338.3 | |
| China | China | mathematician's foot | 333.2 | |
| China | China | builder's foot | 322.8 | |
| China | China | surveyor's foot | 319.5 | |
| Moravia | Czech Republic | stopa | 295.95 | |
| Prague | Czech Republic | stopa | 296.4 | (1851) Bohemian foot or shoe |
| Prague | Czech Republic | stopa | 301.7 | (1759) Quoted as "11 pouces 1 3/4 lignes" (Note: The source document used pre-metric French units (pied, pouce and ligne).) |
| Denmark | Denmark | fod | 313.85 | Until 1835, thereafter the Prussian foot |
| Denmark | Denmark | fod | 330.5 | (1759) Quoted as "2 1/2 lignes larger than the pied [of Paris]" |
| France | France | pied du roi | 324.84 | (Note: The original meter was computed using pre-metric French units.) |
| Angoulême | France | pied d'Angoulême | 347.008 | |
| Bordeaux (urban) | France | pied de ville de Bordeaux | 343.606 | |
| Bordeaux (rural) | France | pied de terre de Bordeaux | 357.214 | |
| Strasbourg | France | pied de Strasbourg | 294.95 | |
| Württemberg | Germany | Fuß | 286.49 | |
| Hanover | Germany | Fuß | 292.10 | |
| Augsburg | Germany | römischer Fuß | 296.17 | |
| Nuremberg | Germany | Fuß | 303.75 | |
| Meiningen-Hildburghausen | Germany | Fuß | 303.95 | |
| Oldenburg | Germany | römischer Fuß | 296.41 | |
| Weimar | Germany | Fuß | 281.98 | |
| Lübeck | Germany | Fuß | 287.62 | |
| Aschaffenburg | Germany | Fuß | 287.5 | |
| Darmstadt | Germany | Fuß | 287.6 | Until 1818, thereafter the Hessen "metric foot" |
| Bremen | Germany | Fuß | 289.35 | |
| Rhineland | Germany | Fuß | 313.7 | |
| Berlin | Germany | Fuß | 309.6 | |
| Hamburg | Germany | Fuß | 286.8 | |
| Bavaria | Germany | Fuß | 291.86 | |
| Aachen | Germany | Fuß | 282.1 | |
| Leipzig | Germany | Fuß | 282.67 | |
| Dresden | Germany | Fuß | 283.11 | |
| Saxony | Germany | Fuß | 283.19 | |
| Prussia | Germany, Poland, Russia etc. | Rheinfuß | 313.85 | |
| Frankfurt am Main | Germany | Fuß | 284.61 | |
| Venice & Lombardy | Italy | | 347.73 | |
| Turin | Italy | | 323.1 | |
| Rome | Italy | piede romano | 297.896 | |
| Riga | Latvia | pēda | 274.1 | |
| Malta | Malta | pied | 283.7 | |
| Utrecht | Netherlands | voet | 272.8 | |
| Amsterdam | Netherlands | voet | 283.133 | Divided into 11 duimen (inches, lit. 'thumbs') |
| Honsbossche en Rijpse | Netherlands | voet | 285.0 | |
| 's-Hertogenbosch | Netherlands | voet | 287.0 | |
| Gelderland | Netherlands | voet | 292.0 | |
| Bloois (Zeeland) | Netherlands | voet | 301.0 | |
| Schouw | Netherlands | voet | 311.0 | |
| Rotterdam | Netherlands | voet | 312.43 | |
| Rijnland | Netherlands | voet | 314.858 | |
| Norway | Norway | fot | 313.75 | (1824–1835) (Note: The Norwegian fot was defined in 1824 as the length of a (theoretical) pendulum that would have a period of 12/38 seconds at 45° from the equator.) Thereafter as for Sweden. |
| Warsaw | Poland | stopa | 297.8 | Until 1819 |
| Warsaw | Poland | stopa | 288.0 | (From 1819) Polish stopa |
| Lisbon | Portugal | pé | 330.0 | (From 1835) (Note: Prior to 1835, the pé or foot was not used in Portugal; instead a palm was used. In 1835 the size of the palm was increased from 217.37 mm (according to Palaiseau) to 220 mm.) |
| South Africa | South Africa | Cape foot | 314.858 | Originally equal to the Rijnland foot; redefined as 1.033 English feet in 1859. |
| Burgos and Castile | Spain | pie de Burgos/ Castellano | 278.6 | (1759) Quoted as "122.43 lignes" |
| Toledo | Spain | pie | 279.0 | (1759) Quoted as "10 pouces 3.7 lignes" |
| Sweden | Sweden | fot | 296.9 | = 12 tum (inches). The Swedish fot was also used in Finland (jalka). |
| Zürich | Switzerland | | 300.0 | |
| Galicia | Ukraine, Poland | stopa galicyjska | 296.96 | Part of Austria–Hungary before World War I |
| Scotland | United Kingdom | | 305.287 | (Note: The Scots foot ceased to be legal after the Act of Union in 1707.) |

In Belgium, the words pied (French) and voet (Dutch) would have been used interchangeably.

== Present day uses ==
=== International ISO-standard and other intermodal shipping containers ===
International Organization for Standardization (ISO)-defined intermodal containers for efficient global freight/cargo shipping, were defined using feet rather than meters for their leading outside (corner) dimensions. All ISO-standard containers to this day are eight feet (2.4 m) wide, and their outer heights and lengths are also primarily defined in, or derived from feet. Quantities of global shipping containers are still primarily counted in twenty-foot equivalent units (TEUs).

=== Aviation ===
Everyday global (civilian) air traffic and aviation continues to be controlled in flight levels (flying altitudes) separated by thousands of feet (although typically read out in hundreds; for example, "flight level 330" means 33,000 feet (10,000 m) in altitude.

== Dimension ==
In measurement, the term "linear foot" (sometimes incorrectly referred to as "lineal foot") refers to the number of feet in a length of material (such as lumber or fabric) without regard to the width; it is used to distinguish from surface area in square foot.

== See also ==
- Anthropic units
- History of measurement
- International System of Units
- Korean units of measurement
- Mermin's foot
- Pous
- Systems of measurement

== Sources ==
- Mozhnik, Franz (1848). Lehrbuch des gesammten Rechnens für die vierte Classe der Hauptschulen in den k. k. Staaten [Combined mathematics textbook for the fourth form of senior schools in the imperial–royal States] (in German). Vienna: Verlage der k. k. Schulbücher-Verschleiß-Administration. OCLC 781064769. Wikidata Q135315106.
