= Rijnland =

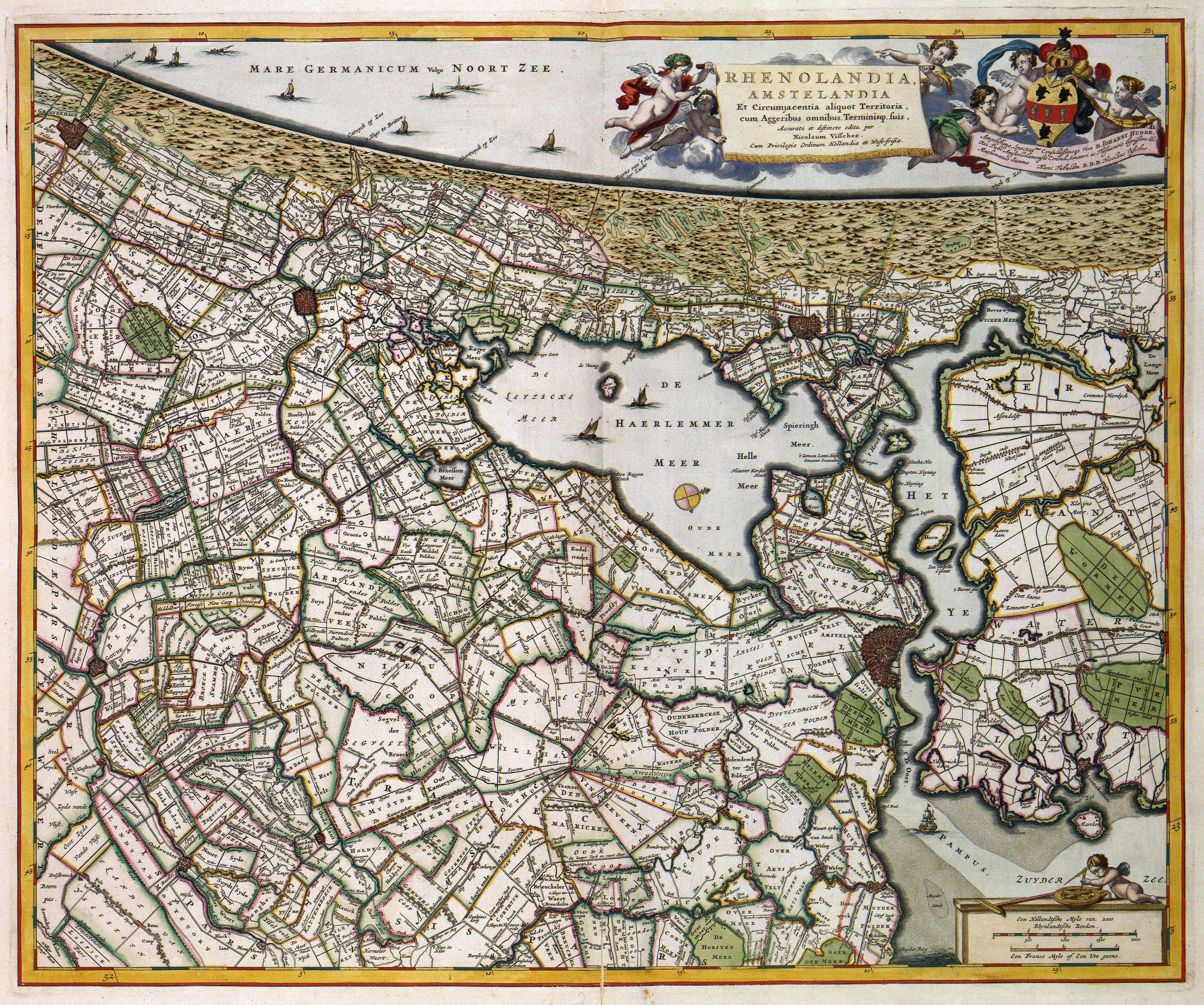
1681 map of "Rhenolandia, Amstelandia". Rijnland is roughly the area on the left side of the map.

The name Rijnland (alternative historical spellings: Rhijnland, Rhynland, Rynland; Latin Rhenolandia) means "Rhineland" in Dutch. When referring to the Rhine in Germany, "Rijnland" has the same meaning as "Rhineland" in English or "Rheinland" in German. However, "Rijnland" has a specific, different meaning in a Dutch context - the area along the Oude Rijn.

== Special Dutch sense ==
When used in the specific Dutch context, "Rijnland" generally refers to the area around the Oude Rijn, the lower reaches of a minor branch of the Rhine river in the Netherlands. This river is referred to as "Rijn" (Rhine) in the Netherlands for historical reasons. This small, heavily-canalised and remote branch of the Rhine was, in fact, the river that the Romans used to call the Rhine and the northern limit of the Roman Empire in this area. The term "Rijnland" is itself ancient.

== Relationship between Rhine, Rijn and Rijnland ==
Today, when the Rhine river enters the Netherlands from Germany, most of it becomes the river Waal and is no longer called the Rhine. However, some of it flows north (through a canal) after which it splits into the Nederrijn (Lower Rhine) and the IJssel. The Nederrijn eventually becomes the Lek, but a branch of it flows through a canal to Utrecht where it is further canalised and directed west. The names for this minor waterway as it flows through the provinces of Utrecht and South Holland change, but all the names still include the name "Rijn" and it is not unusual for it to be referred to as the "Rijn". Its varying names are Kromme Rijn ("Crooked Rhine"), Leidse Rijn ("Leiden Rhine") and Oude Rijn ("Old Rhine"). The Oude Rijn ends as it flows into a sluice at Katwijk aan Zee, where its waters can be discharged into the North Sea. It is the area around the Oude Rijn that is referred to as "Rijnland".

== Usage ==
The name "Rijnland" is the name of several administrative areas, both current and historical, and it can also be used in a more vaguely defined sense:

- the area along the Oude Rijn, extending roughly from around Utrecht to Katwijk aan Zee;
- the region around Leiden;
- the jurisdiction of the Hoogheemraadschap van Rijnland (Rijnland District Water Control Board), a Dutch water board based in Leiden;
- the area covered by "Holland Rijnland", an administrative "regional collaboration" (samenwerkingsverband) of various municipalities in the Duin- en Bollenstreek and the Leiden area;
- Rijnland, a gau (gouw) that was absorbed around 900 A.D. into the County of Holland, and that was (along with Schieland and Maasland) at the heart of the medieval County of Holland.

The word "Rijnland" is also used in several historical Dutch units of measurement:

- units of length called the "Rijnlandse roede" (Rijnland rod) and "Rijnlandse voet" (Rijnland foot);
- units of surface area called the "Rijnlandse Roede" (Rijnland square rod) and the "Rijnlandse voet" (Rijnland square foot).
