= Oog in Al =

Residential area

Coordinates: 52°05′09″N 5°05′12″E

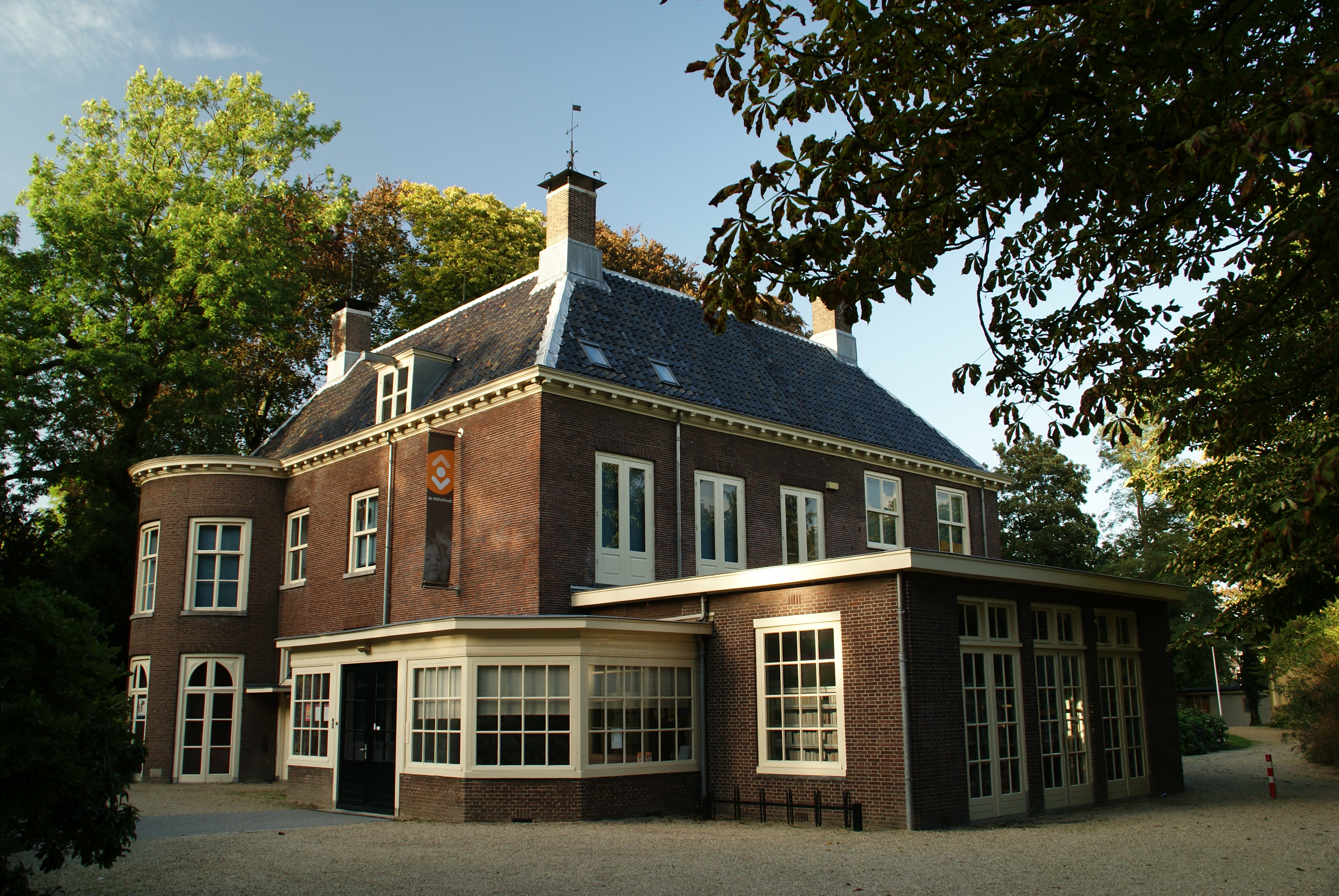
The 18th century country house Huis Oog in Al built by Everard Meyster in the public park gave its name to the area.

Oog in Al (Dutch pronunciation: [ˌoːx ɪn ˈɑl], Utrecht dialect: [ˌouχ ɪn ˈæl]) is a residential area in the west of the city of Utrecht in the Netherlands. The Amsterdam–Rhine Canal, the Merwede Canal and the Leidse Rijn canal form the area's limits, rendering it a man-made island in the shape of a triangle.

From the 12th century, the area of present-day Oog in Al was part of the 'Trechter Weide', the communal meadow of the city of Utrecht. The meadow was divided in the 'Hoge Weide' and 'Lage Weide' (high meadow and low meadow), divided by a canal, the Vletsloot. Oog in Al was later built in the 'Hoge Weide' part of the communal meadow.

The Leidse Rijn was dug in 1663–1664 as a water transport link between Utrecht and Leiden. The Utrecht nobleman Everard Meyster built a residential estate in a curve of the new canal, where a new city expansion planned by mayor Hendrik Moreelse, could best be viewed. For this reason Meyster called his estate "Oog in Al" (Eye on All).

When the Merwede Canal was dug at the end of the 19th century, the area surrounding the estate underwent a radical change. As the Canal could only be crossed by way of a limited number of bridges, it constituted a barrier to further city expansion in the Oog in Al area. The City of Utrecht nevertheless purchased the ground in 1918 with a view to the development of a new residential area.

The architects Berlage and Holsboer designed the layout of Utrecht's western expansion, which included plans for the residential area Oog in Al. Adjacent to the present-day Park Oog in Al, a first batch of 381 spacious middle-class homes was constructed in 1921. Meyster's estate was preserved and converted to public use. It housed the area's public library before that was moved to a refurbished factory, and currently houses a cafe.

The street pattern of the south eastern part of present-day Oog in Al reflects the original design of Berlage and Holsboer. The Robert Schumannstraat, in the oldest part of the area, boasts a row of terraced houses designed by Gerrit Rietveld.

== Famous inhabitants ==
- The football player Marco van Basten
- Olympic speed skating champion Jochem Uytdehaage.
- Author Geert van Istendael spent part of his childhood in the area.
- Publisher Willem Anton Hart was born here in 1946
- Mathematician and mathematics educator Hans Freudenthal lived in this area and died on a bench in the parc Oog in Al in 1990.
- Dafne Schippers
- Politician and gay rights activist Boris Dittrich spent his childhood in Oog in Al.
