= Kosten (surname) =

Kosten is a surname. Notable people with the surname include:

- Anthony Kosten (born 1958), English-French chess Grandmaster
- Annabel Kosten (born 1977), Dutch swimmer
