= Kosten unit =

Dutch measure of aircraft noise

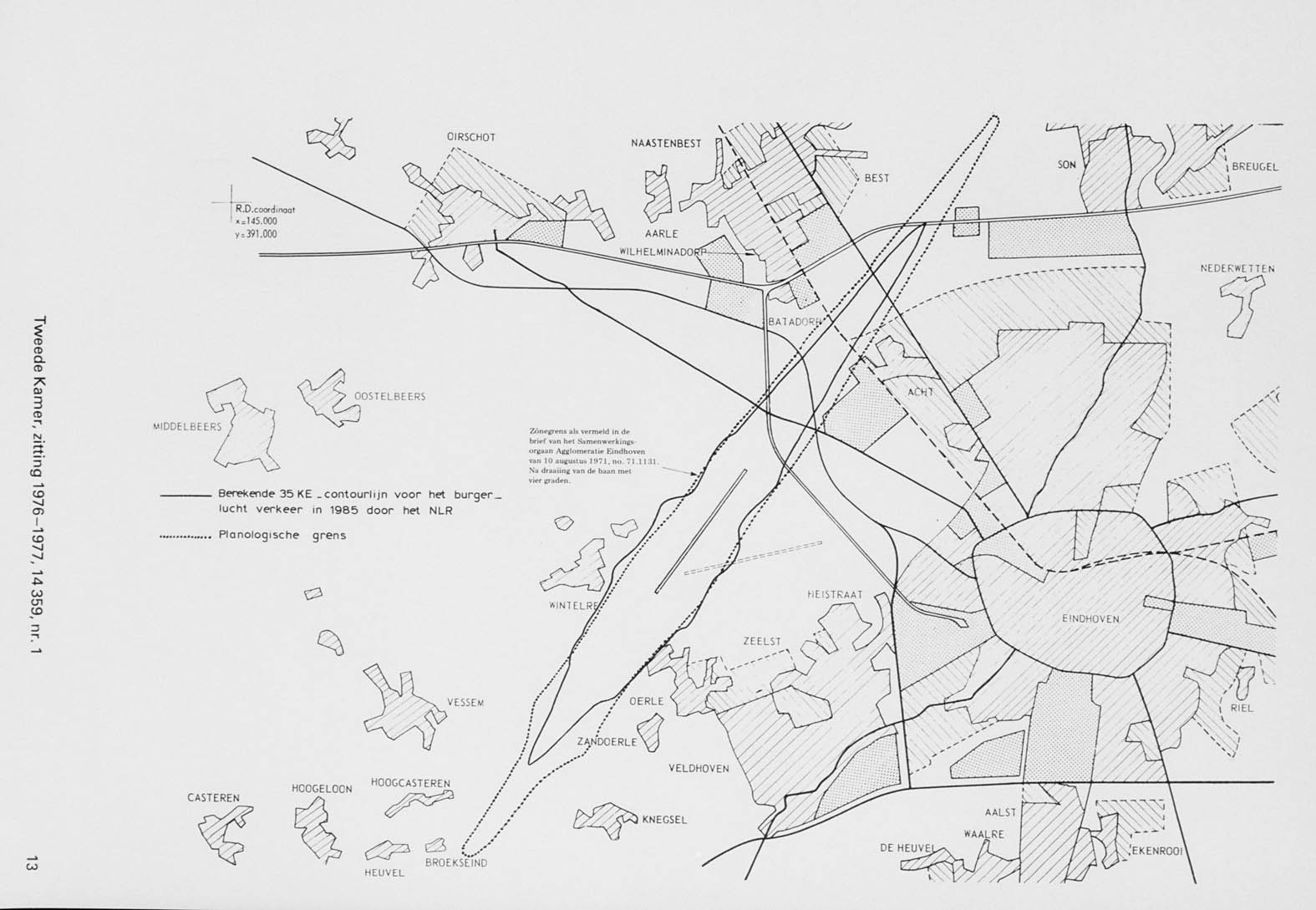
Eindhoven airbase. From an early stage, this airbase was a source of complaints regarding noise disturbance in nearby Welschap.

Content in this edit is translated from the existing Dutch Wikipedia article at nl:Kosteneenheid; see its history for attribution.

The Kosten unit (Ke) is a commonly used aggregate measure for aircraft noise in the Netherlands, developed by the Kosten Committee 1963. It is a yearly average which represents outdoor noise levels. It is named after Prof. C.W. Kosten, chairman of the government advisory committee, who in the 1960s investigated how noise exposure can best be calculated as a measure of noise pollution from air traffic. The Kosten unit is the sum of a number of factors that determine the noise exposure, calculated over the period of one year (e.g. the 35 Ke line). These include:

- The noise production of aircraft;
- The numbers of take-offs and landings;
- The times of arrival and departure.

In this sum, the noise exposure at night counts more heavily than the noise exposure during the day (for example, for one night flight there are ten flights during the day). The sliding scale proposed by the Kosten Committee at the time (different weighting of noise nuisance during night or day) is not the result of research, but the scale values are a guess in which the Committee notes that the height of the different scale values still needed to be further investigated. However, that investigation deemed necessary did not take place. The Kosten Committee feared that without a sliding scale there would be a lot of noise nuisance at the beginning of the day (07 a.m.) and at the end of the day (6 p.m.) and the Committee considered this undesirable. A further analysis of complaints about noise nuisance from Schiphol in the 1990s shows that there are reasons to assume that a night flight is not experienced ten times more nuisance than a day flight, but twenty to thirty times. [source?] The cut-off value of 65 decibels later used by politicians, whereby aircraft noise lower than 65 decibels does not count in the totals, is not the result of any research (by the Costs Committee) but was more or less later fiddled in by politicians. [source?]

== External Sources ==
Adviescommissie Geluidhinder door Vliegtuigen, 1967. Adviescommissie Geluidhinder door Vliegtuigen, Geluidhinder door vliegtuigen., TNO, Delft (1967) (Advisory Committee on Noise Abatement from Aircraft, 1967. Advisory Committee on Noise Abatement by Aircraft, Noise Abatement by Aircraft., TNO, Delft (1967). - PDF document in Dutch)

Dutch units of measurement
