= Cape foot =

Unit of length for land survey in South Africa

A Cape foot is a unit of length defined as 1.0330 feet (314.9 mm) found in documents of belts and diagrams relating to landed property. It was equal to the Rijnland voet and was introduced into South Africa by Dutch settlers in the seventeenth and eighteenth century.

Its relationship to the English foot was clarified in 1859 by an act of the government of the Cape Colony, South Africa. It was used for land surveying and title deeds in rural areas of South Africa apart from Natal and was used for urban surveying and title deeds in the Transvaal. There were 144 square Cape feet in one Cape rood and 600 Cape roods (86,400 square Cape feet) in one morgen.

Its use ended when South Africa adopted the metric system in 1977.
