= Nigtevecht =

- Village
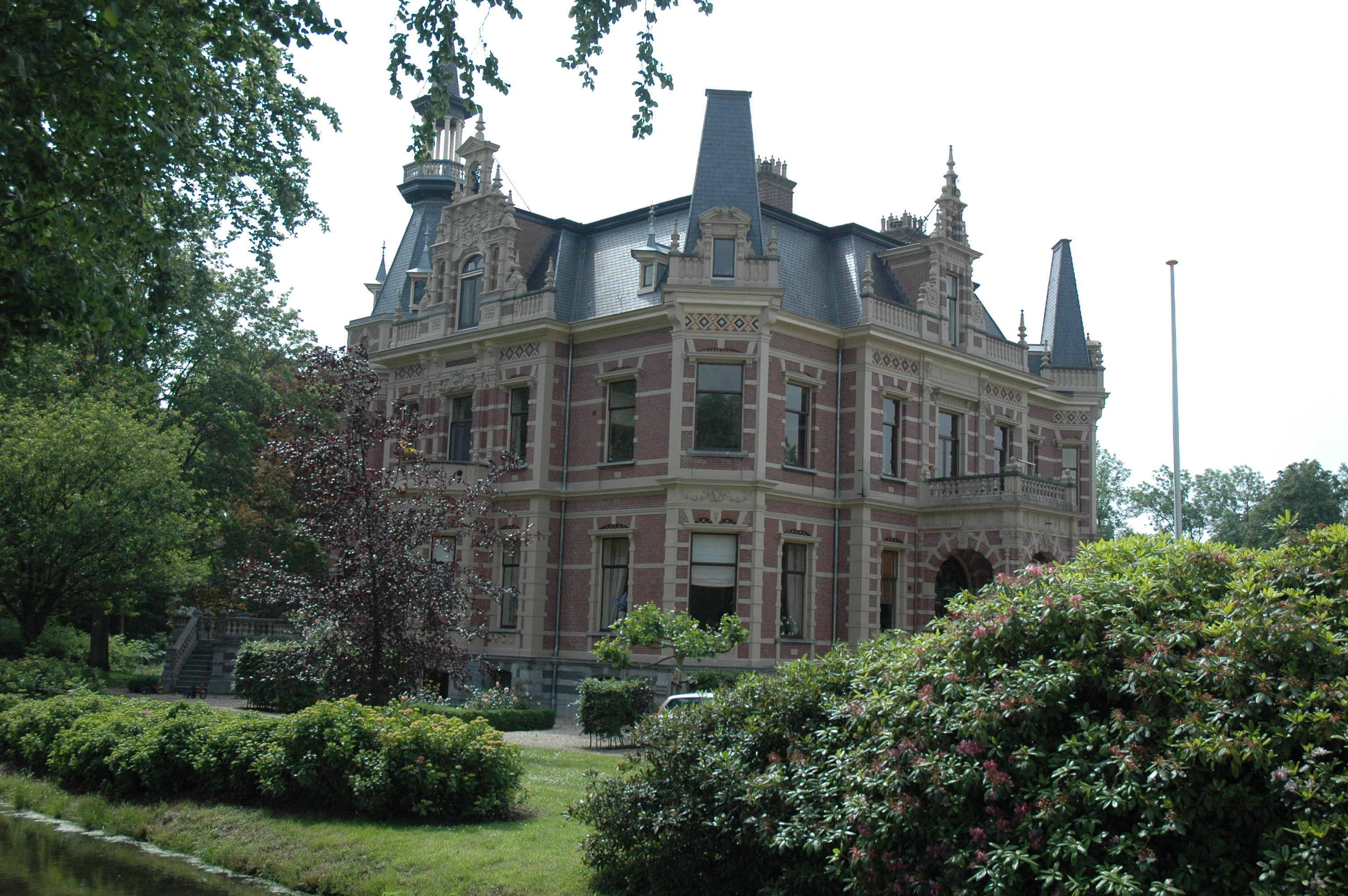
- The gardens of Zwaanwijck in Nigtevecht were disigned by landscape architect Mien Ruys

- Coat of arms

- Location in the Netherlands Nigtevecht (Netherlands)
- Coordinates: 52°16′27″N 5°1′40″E
- Country: Netherlands
- Province: Utrecht
- Municipality: Stichtse Vecht

Area
  - Total: 4.57 km^{2} (1.76 sq mi)
- Elevation: 0.6 m (2.0 ft)

Population (2021)
  - Total: 1,575
  - Density: 345/km^{2} (893/sq mi)
- Time zone: UTC+1 (CET)
  - Summer (DST): UTC+2 (CEST)
- Postal code: 1393
- Dialing code: 0294

Nigtevecht (Dutch pronunciation: [ˈnɪxtəˌvɛxt]) is a village in the province of Utrecht, Netherlands with a population of 1,395. Formerly part of the municipality of Loenen; it has been part of the newly-formed municipality of Stichtse Vecht since 2011. It is situated about 9 km (5.6 mi) west of Bussum along the Vecht River in the Vechtstreek.

== History ==
The village was first mentioned between 1280 and 1287 as te nichtevecht, and means "along the Vecht. Nigtevecht developed along the dike of the river with the church in the centre. In 1673, the village and church were destroyed by the French. Several estates have been built near Nigtevecht by Amsterdam merchants. Nigtevecht was home to 409 people in 1840.

Fort Hinderdam is a little fort on a river island. It used to be part of the Dutch Water Line. In 1913, it became part of the Stelling van Amsterdam. The fort is now in ruins and the island has become a nature area.

== Gallery ==
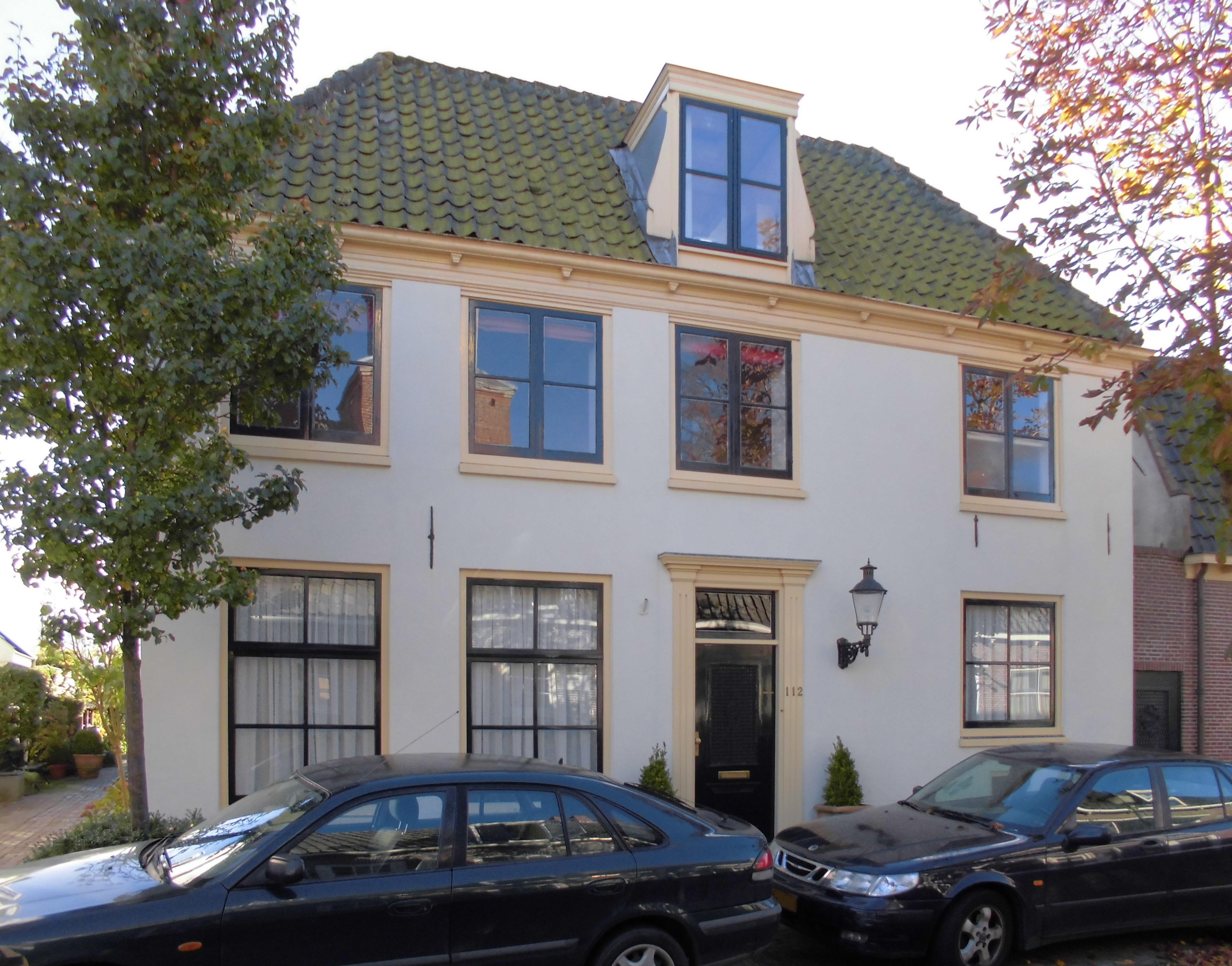
Dorpstraat 112

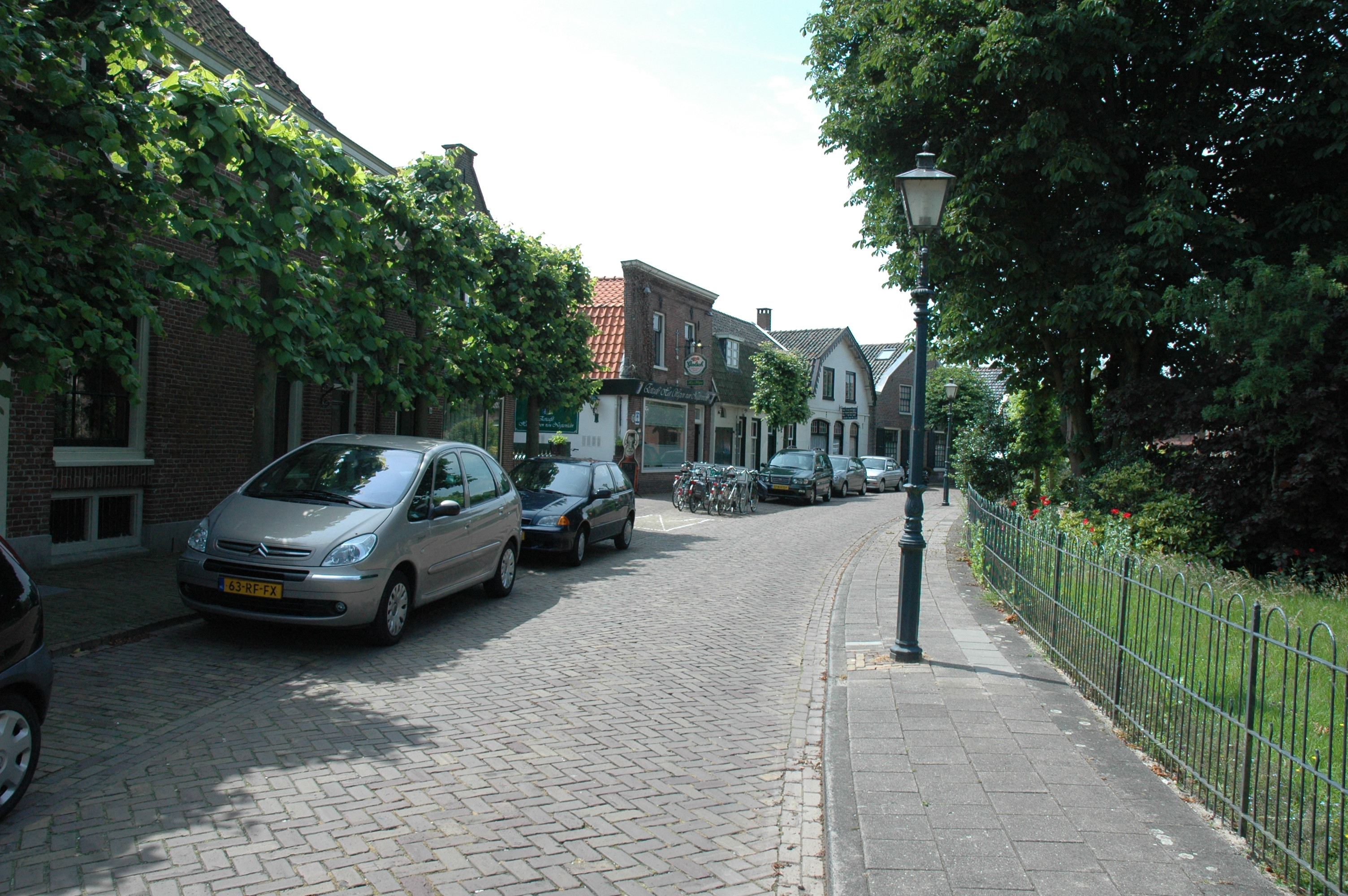
Village centre

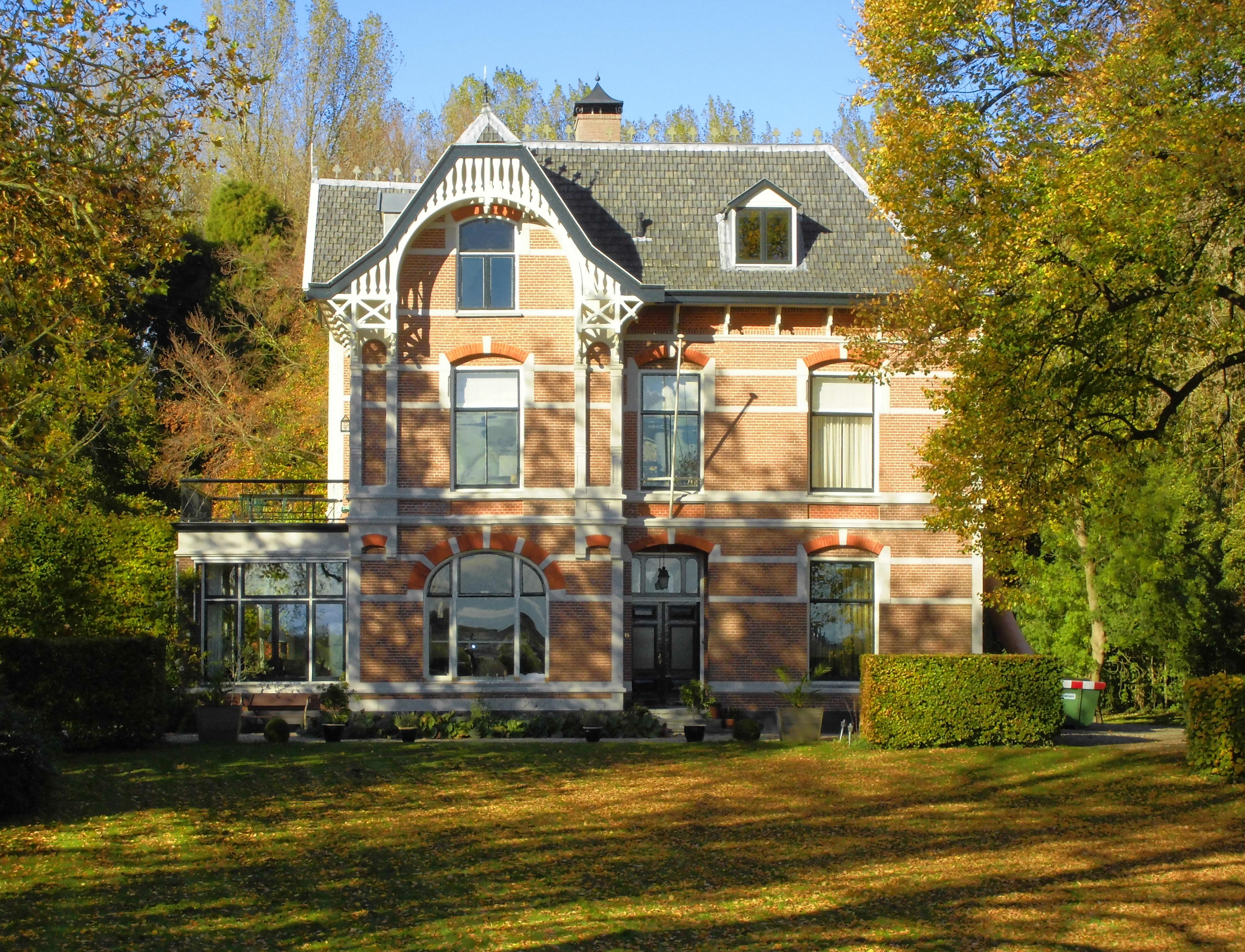
Breevecht

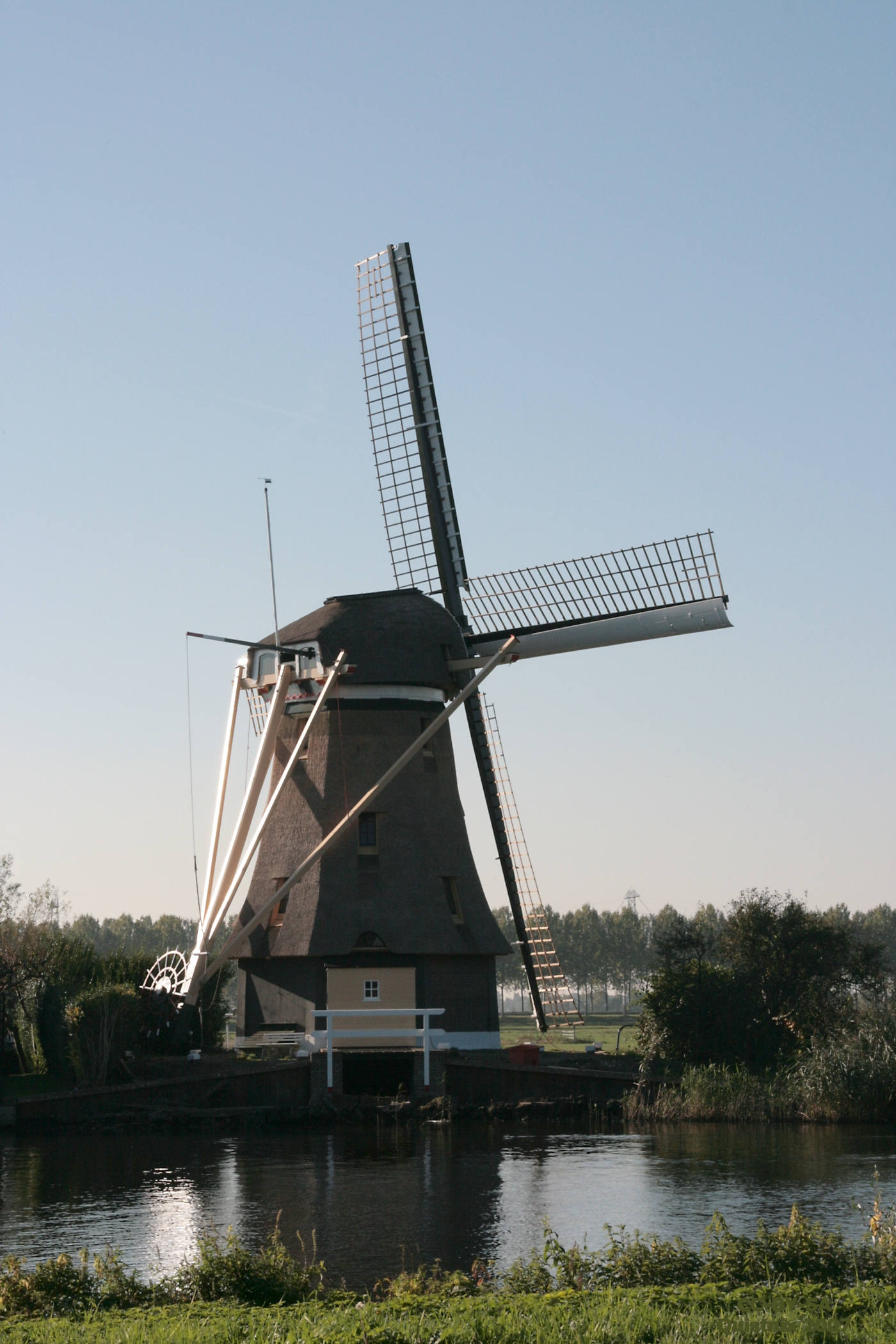
Garsten Windmill
