= Kromme Rijn =

Branch of the Rhine ending at Utrecht, Netherlands

Kromme Rijn Crooked Rhine
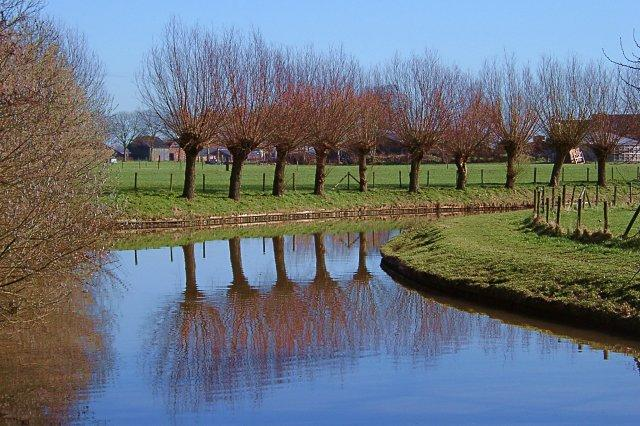

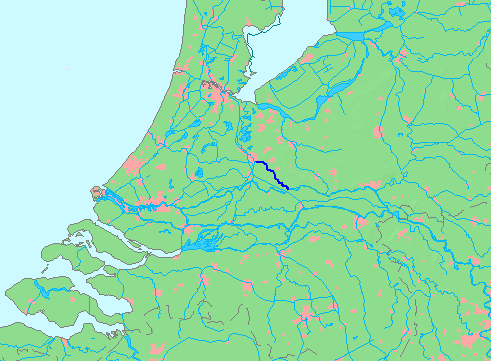
- Location of Kromme Rijn in dark blue.

Location
- Country: Netherlands
- Province: Utrecht

Physical characteristics
- Source: Nederrijn
  - location: Wijk bij Duurstede, Utrecht
  - coordinates: 51°58′15″N 5°21′06″E
- Mouth: Leidse Rijn
  - location: Utrecht, Utrecht
  - coordinates: 52°04′52.5″N 5°07′31″E
- Length: 28 km (17 mi)

The Kromme Rijn (Dutch pronunciation: [ˈkrɔmə ˈrɛin]; "Crooked Rhine", for its many bends) is a river in the central Netherlands.

In Roman times, this northernmost branch of the Rhine delta was the main distributary of this major European river. Along its banks the Romans built their frontier castella part of the Limes Germanicus.

Since the Middle Ages, however, the stream lost its importance as it silted up, and eventually it is nearly cut off from the Nederrijn-Lek main artery. Yet it retained the name "Rhine".

The Kromme Rijn splits off the Nederrijn-Lek main artery at the old town of Wijk bij Duurstede (called Dorestad in the early medieval period), after which it twists and turns through the province of Utrecht, past the towns of Cothen, Werkhoven, Odijk and Bunnik, and ends in the moat of the city of Utrecht.

Originally, the city of Utrecht was built by the Romans at a ford near the place where the Kromme Rijn forks into rivers Vecht (north) and Leidse Rijn (west); the last stretch within the city walls, however, was channelised to form the Oudegracht canal. Rivers Leidse Rijn and Vecht extend from the city moat and are the continuation of the Kromme Rijn.

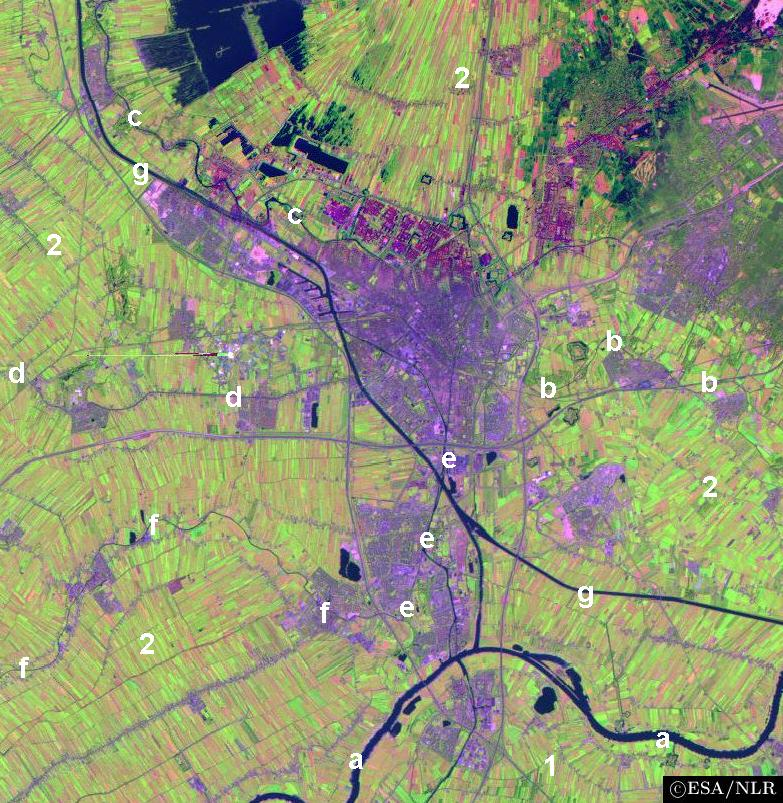
Satellite image of the central part of the Rhine–Meuse–Scheldt delta showing the city of Utrecht and its surroundings, including the Kromme Rijn branch (b), which forks from the Nederrijn-Lek main artery at Wijk bij Duurstede (just outside this image, to the east of the rightmost number 2).

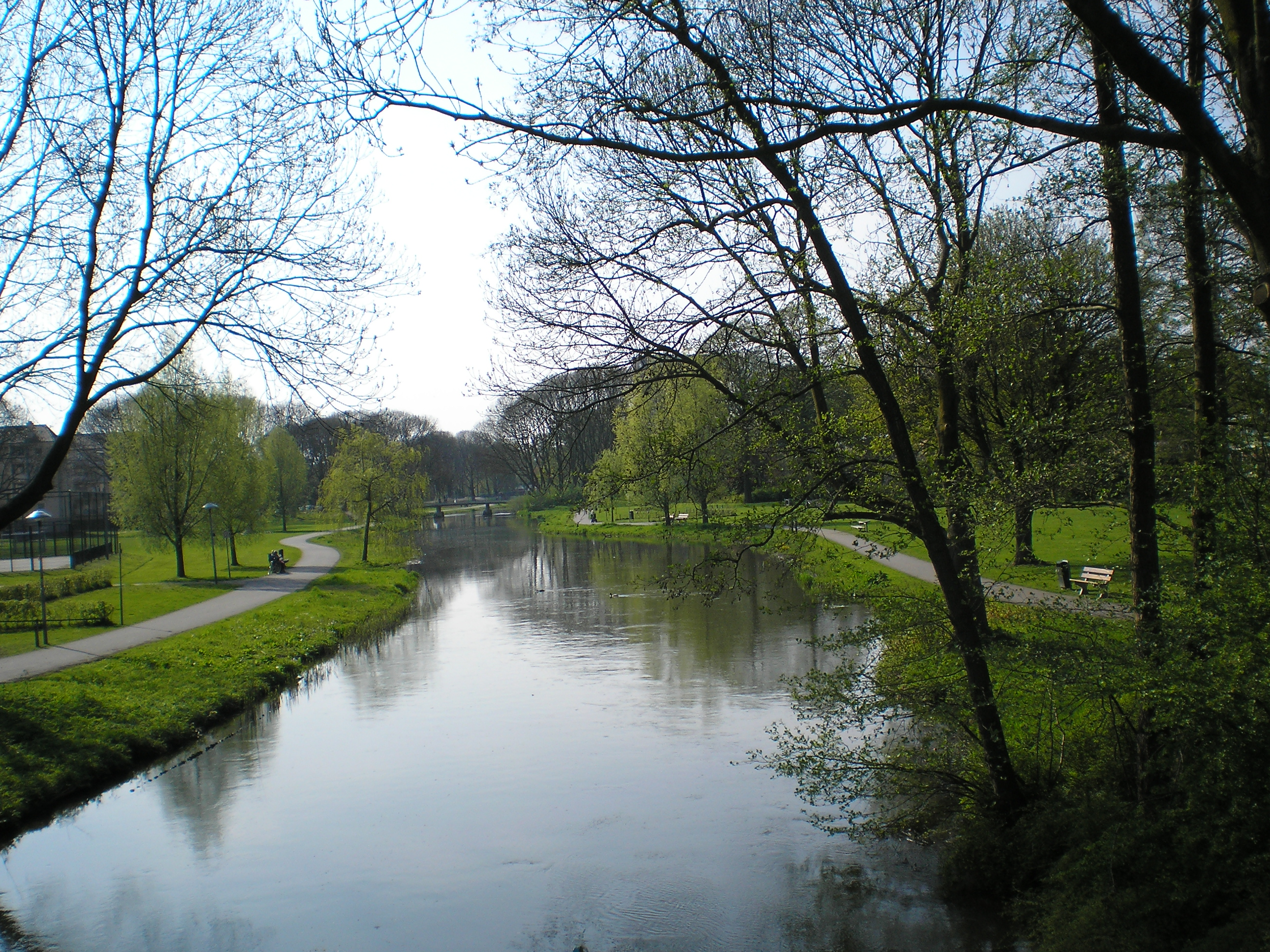
The Kromme Rijn in Utrecht
