= Leidse Rijn =

Leidse Rijn Leiden's Rhine
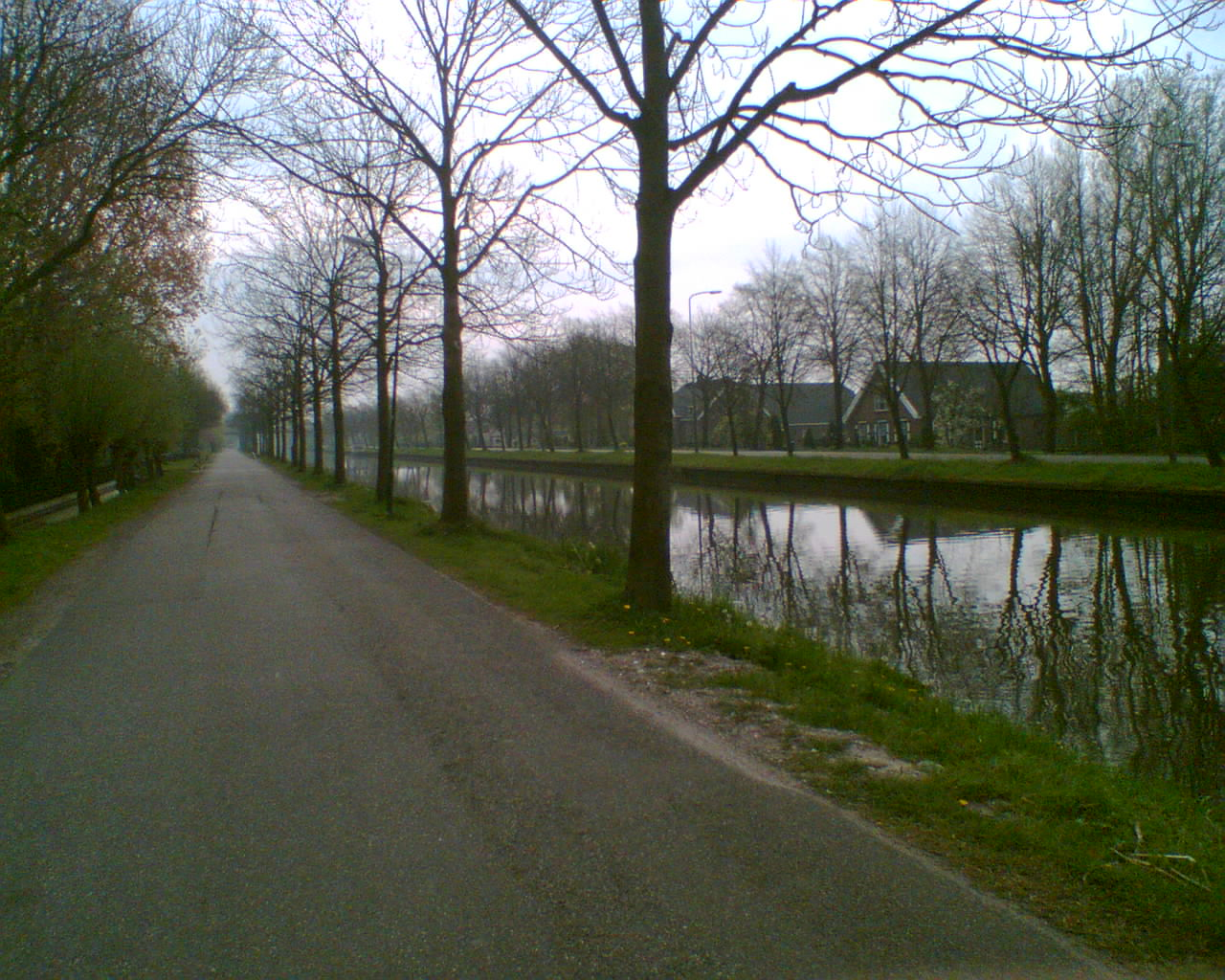
- Leidse Rijn between Harmelen and De Meern

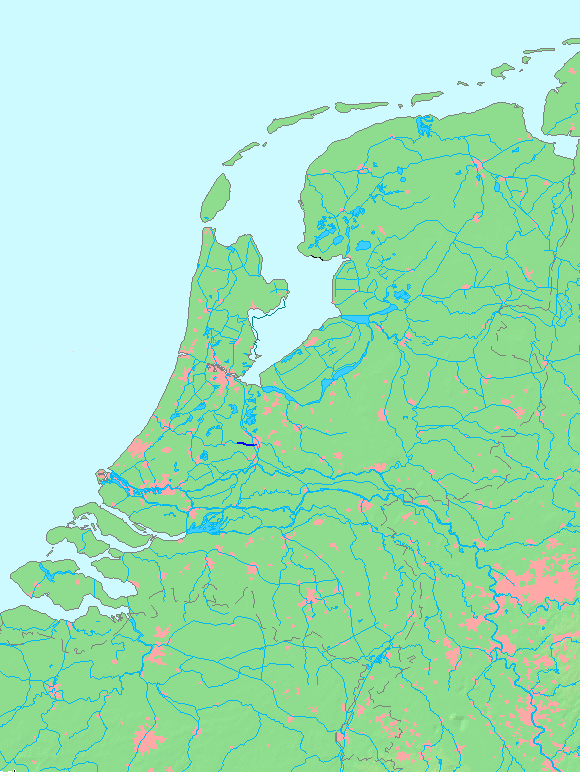
- Location of Leidse Rijn in dark blue.

Location
- Country: Netherlands
- Province: Utrecht

Physical characteristics
- Source: Kromme Rijn
  - location: Utrecht, Utrecht
  - coordinates: 52°05′33″N 5°06′38″E
- Mouth: Oude Rijn
  - location: Harmelen, South Holland
  - coordinates: 52°05′31.5″N 4°57′48.5″E
- Length: 13 km (8.1 mi)

The Leidse Rijn (Dutch for "Leiden's Rhine") is a canal in the province of Utrecht, Netherlands.

It was dug since the Middle Ages when the meandering old Rhine course silted up.

The Leidse Rijn has a length of 13 km. Towns along the Leidse Rijn are De Meern and Harmelen. While still in Utrecht city the Leidse Rijn crosses the Merwede Canal and the Amsterdam-Rhine Canal.

It is the continuation of the Kromme Rijn (Crooked Rhine) through the moat system of Utrecht. The canal ends in Harmelen. There it connects to the Oude Rijn, which eventually flows into the North Sea at Katwijk aan Zee.

The canal gives its name to the Utrecht neighborhood of Leidsche Rijn.

== History ==
Since the beginning of our era, the old course of the Rhine between Utrecht and Harmelen became increasingly more difficult to navigate. The building of a dam in the Kromme Rijn in 1122 led to a silting up of the old Rhine below Utrecht, especially as it meandered through very flat terrain.

Already in the early Middle Ages (ca. 700) a canal from Utrecht to Vleuten was dug. When the part Vleuten-Harmelen ultimately became too narrow and winding as well, in 1381 the Oude Rijn (Old Rhine) canal (Harmelen-Utrecht) was dug.

Under the expansion plans of the Utrecht city mayor Hendrick Moreelse in 1662-1665 a new shortcut was dug, the Leidse Rijn, connecting to where the Oude Rijn canal made a curve to the northeast. At the place where the new canal connected to the Oude Rijn the nobleman Everard Meyster built an estate called Oog in Al.

Eventually the name Leidse Rijn came to be used for the whole section Utrecht-Harmelen.

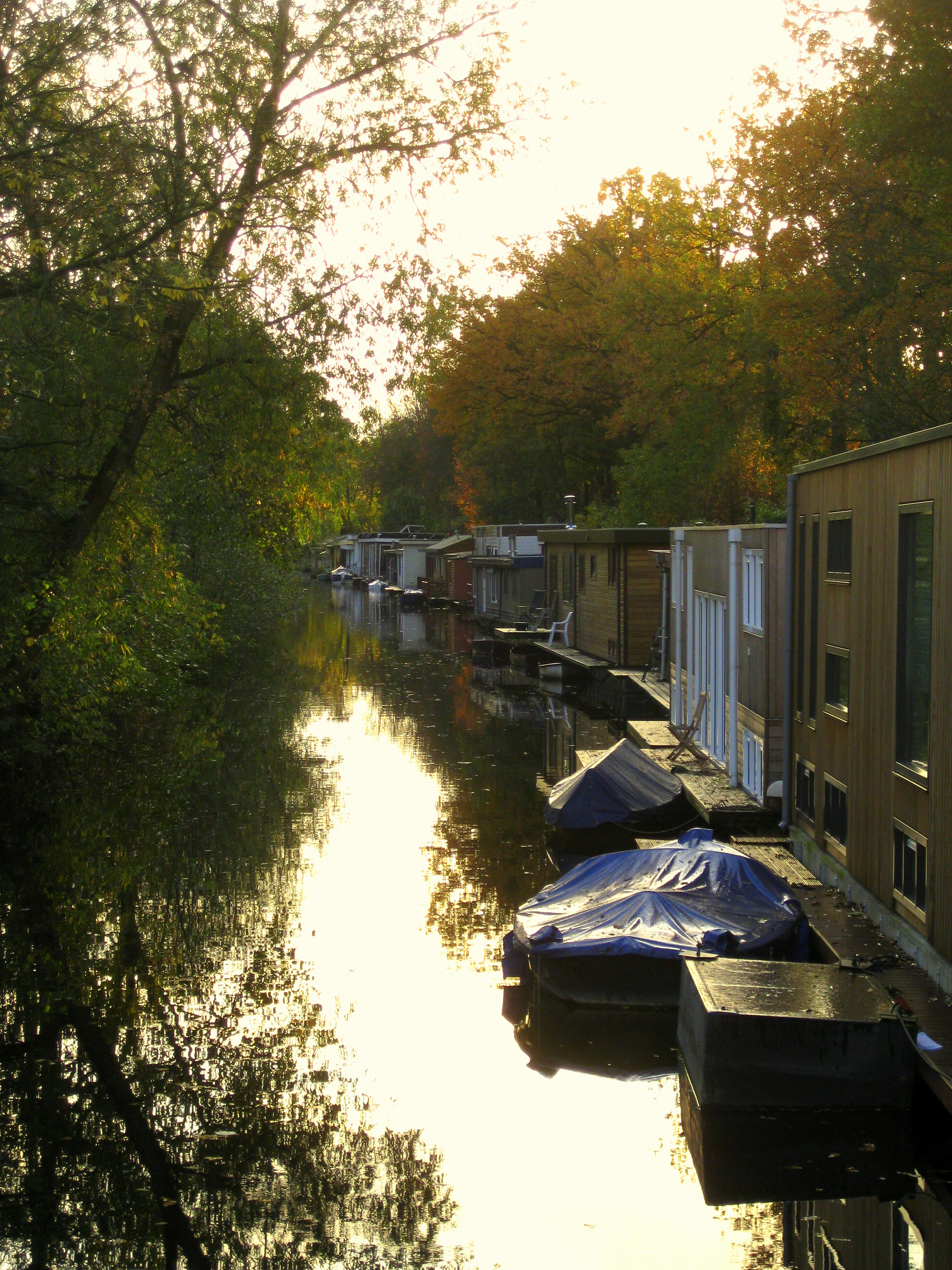
The Leidse Rijn at Oog in Al

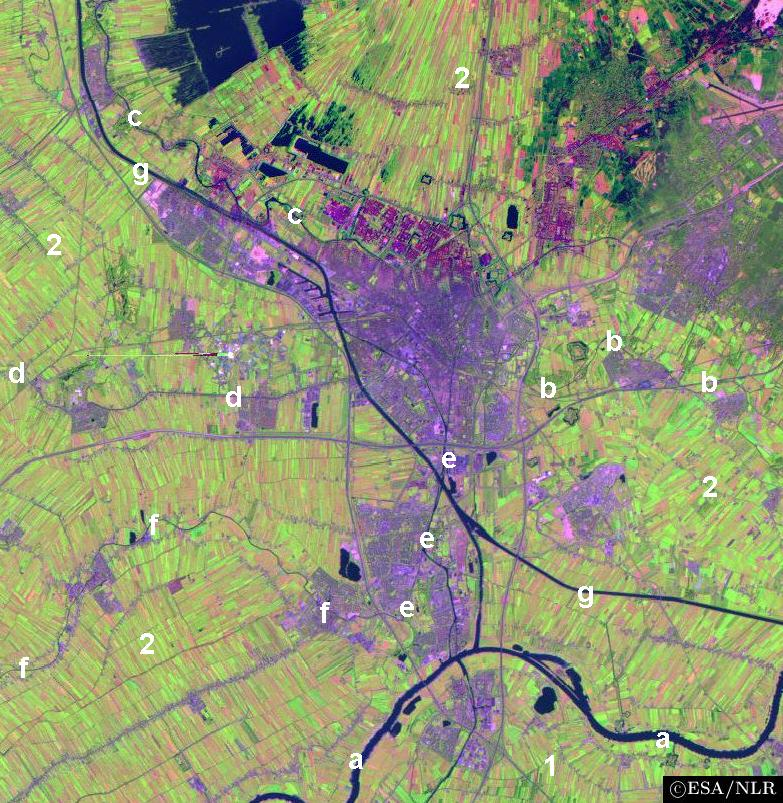
Satellite close-up of the Utrecht region showing the Leidse Rijn-Oude Rijn (d).
