= Groene Hart =

Area of the Netherlands

Coordinates: 52°06′45″N 4°42′03″E

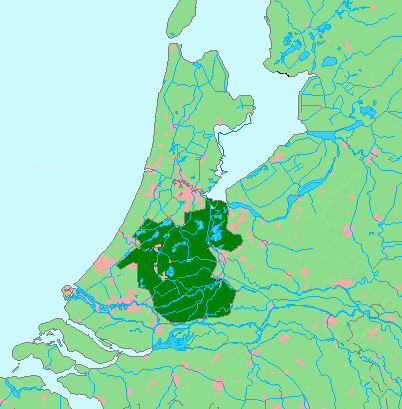
Location of the Groene Hart in the Netherlands

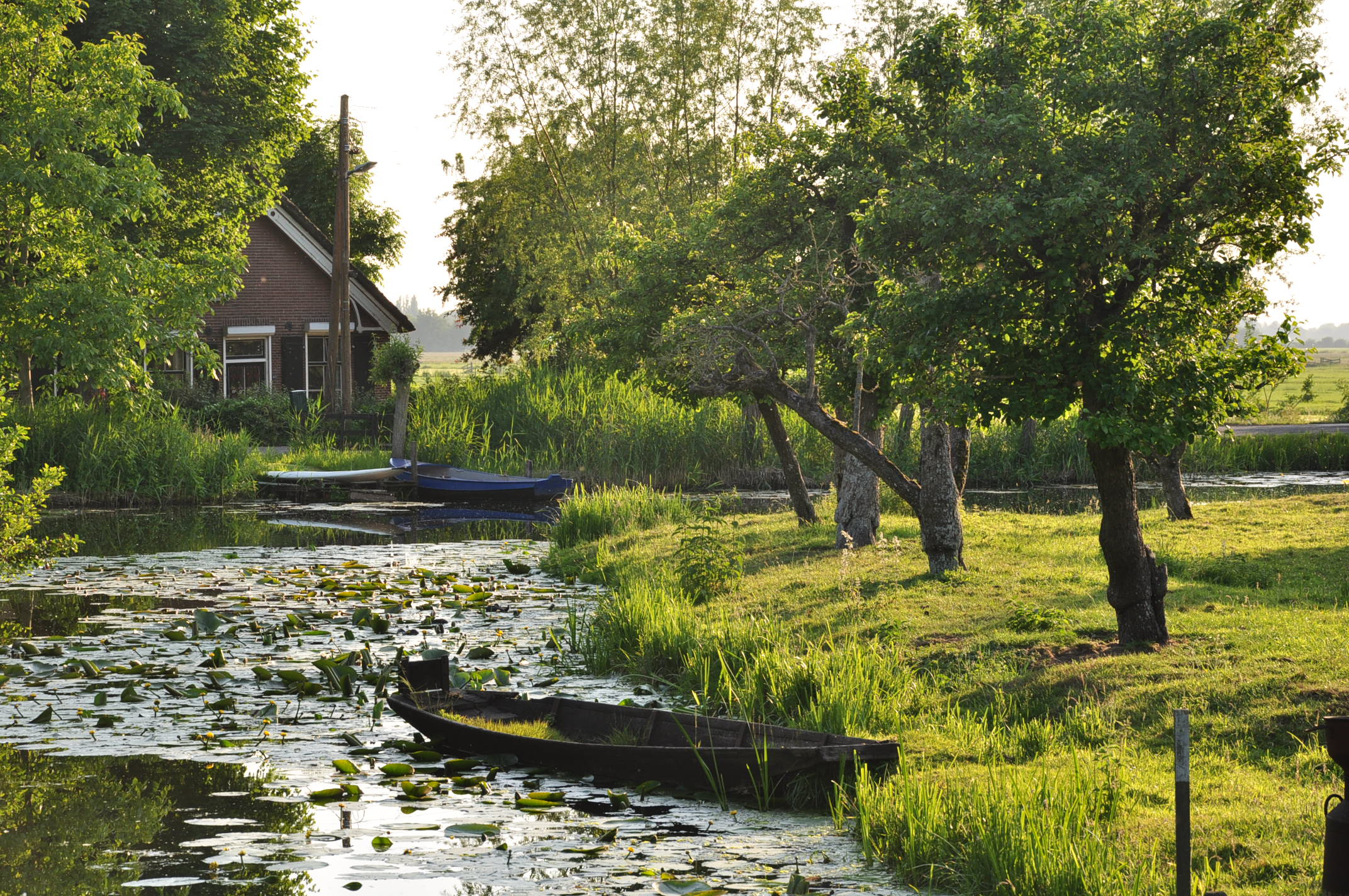
Landscape in the municipality of Vlist, in the Groene Hart

The Groene Hart (Dutch pronunciation: [ˈɣrunə ˈɦɑrt]; "Green Heart") is a relatively thinly populated area of the Netherlands consisting of pastures and peatlands, covering much of the middle portion of the Randstad megalopolis. The major Dutch cities of Rotterdam, The Hague, Leiden, Haarlem, Amsterdam, and Utrecht surround this area. Cities inside the Groene Hart include Zoetermeer, Alphen aan den Rijn, Gouda, Woerden, and the smaller cities of Schoonhoven, Oudewater, Haastrecht, Nieuwkoop, Montfoort, Waddinxveen, Bodegraven, Vianen and Boskoop.

== Description ==
The Groene Hart has a rural character, which contrasts with the urban areas around it. Agriculture, nature, and recreation are the primary activities in the Groene Hart. Mills, dikes and Dutch cows are the primary sights of this lowland area. The Groene Hart is important Dutch bird habitat. The bird species black-tailed godwit, northern lapwing and Eurasian oystercatcher can all be found in the area.

== History ==
Since the Dutch Golden Age, there has been a ring of cities surrounding this green and open central area. This area was given the nickname of "Groene Hart" by the middle of the twentieth century. The Groene Hart developed in the territory between the large cities in the Western Netherlands as an area of wet meadows and marshland. These wetlands were not suitable for building, so they were used for agriculture and peat production.

== Geography ==
The Groene Hart is a water-rich area, with bodies of water such as the Langeraarse Plassen, Nieuwkoopse Plassen, Reeuwijkse Plassen, Kagerplassen, and Braassemermeer. In addition, rivers such as the Hollandse IJssel, Oude Rijn, Lek, Vlist, Loet, Rotte, and Meije run through the area.

One of the European footpaths runs through the area. In the Netherlands it is known as the Floris V-pad, part of the Dutch LAW 1-3 path. The Limes, the former northern border of the Roman empire in The Netherlands, crosses the Groene Hart.

== Government policy ==
A government policy was adopted in 2003 to preserve the Groene Hart. It allows for the larger cities on the edge of the Groene Hart to build limited amounts of housing. The government also limits the establishment of greenhouses and other types of commercial buildings within the area.

The plan for the development of the Groene Hart includes four areas:

- Around the outside of the Groene Hart is the Randstad, an urban area that almost completely surrounds the Groene Hart. Between these urban areas lie green environs that connect to other green sections of the Netherlands.
- Connected to the Randstad Ring is an extended area of water and forests. This is used for recreation and as a buffer against urban sprawl.
- There will be four core areas for nature and water sports. There will be extended areas of bogs, marshes, and wet forests. These four areas (De Venen, Krimpenerwaard, Vechtplassen, and Hollandse Plassen) will be connected to each other with grassy berms.
- Between the core areas and the outer areas will be pastures for nature, recreation, and agriculture.
