= Haaglanden =

Former official urban region in the Netherlands

Coordinates: 52.0658°N 4.2967°E

Parts of this article have been translated from the Dutch version of this page

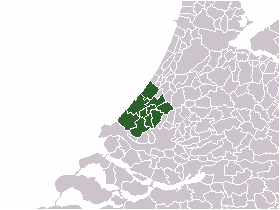
A map showing location of Haaglanden.

Haaglanden (Dutch pronunciation: [ˈɦaːxlɑndə(n)], literally Haguelands) was a conurbation surrounding The Hague in the Netherlands from 1992 until 2015. The city's position as the country's seat of government made the region prominent in the Netherlands. Located on the west coast of the province of South Holland, the region had a population of 1,050,543 in September 2013, and covered an area of 405 km².

Haaglanden was an official term referring to an urban region literally called Haaglanden Urban Region (Stadsgewest Haaglanden). The official website of Haaglanden used the English translation The Hague Region. Another translation would have been the Greater Hague Area. The term was also sometimes used to refer to the conurbation of The Hague in a general, informal sense; "the Hague area" or "the area around The Hague". This area was often treated as a single unit for organisational or statistical purposes. Haaglanden was part of the larger Rotterdam The Hague Metropolitan Area.

On 1 January 2015 Haaglanden was merged into the Rotterdam–The Hague metropolitan area. Haaglanden has since only existed as a safety region. Its use for statistical purposes has since been replaced by the Greater The Hague and Delft & Westland COROP regions. In 2018, South Holland province commissioned a study into the economic benefits of reviving the urban region.

== Geography ==
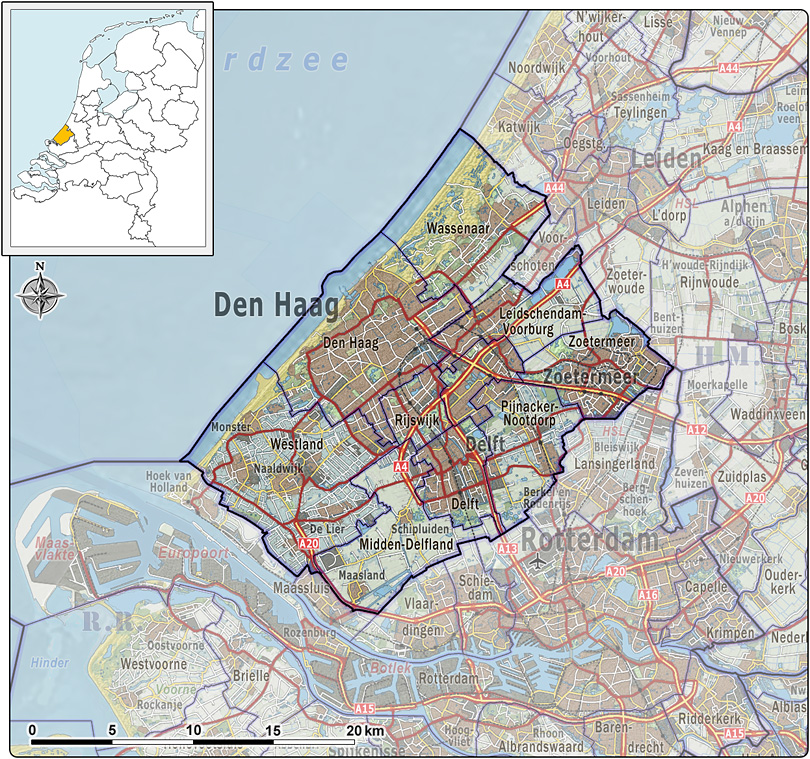
A map of the Haaglanden region as of 2013.

Haaglanden consisted of the nine municipalities of The Hague, Zoetermeer, Westland, Delft, Leidschendam-Voorburg, Pijnacker-Nootdorp, Rijswijk, Wassenaar and Midden-Delfland.

Municipality	Population
The Hague	548,320
Zoetermeer	125,267
Westland	111,382
Delft	103,581
Leidschendam-Voorburg	76,433
Pijnacker-Nootdorp	55,674
Rijswijk	55,220
Wassenaar	26,949
Midden-Delfland	19,414

The Haaglanden conurbation and the Rotterdam conurbation to the east had grown to the point where they are almost contiguous. They were effectively a single urban area, even though they had separate governments, transport systems, etc. The Hague and Rotterdam share the Rotterdam The Hague Airport and a light rail system called RandstadRail. This led to the creation of an official Rotterdam-The Hague metropolitan region (Metropoolregio Rotterdam Den Haag), which has a combined population of approximately 2.4 million, making it one of largest metropolitan regions in Europe.

Haaglanden was bordered to the north by the Leiden conurbation, which had a population of about a quarter million. These two areas, much like The Hague and Rotterdam, had also grown together to the point where they are virtually contiguous.

Haaglanden was part of the southern wing (the Zuidvleugel) of the Randstad, which also includes the conurbations surrounding Amsterdam and Utrecht. This conurbation is one of the most important economic and densely populated areas in the north-west of Europe.

== See also ==
- The Hague
- List of tallest buildings in The Hague
