= Jackie Bouw =

Dutch sculptor and ceramist

- Born: 22 February 1948 (age 78); Sliedrecht
- Website: www.jackiebouw.nl

Jackie Bouw, also known as Jacky or Teuntje Bouw (born 22 February 1948), is a Dutch sculptor and ceramist.

== Life ==
Bouw was born in Sliedrecht. She trained in ceramics at the Technische School in Gouda. She then studied sculpture in the evening course of the Academie voor Beeldende Kunsten in Rotterdam. She had her own studio from 1965. In 1969 she had a gallery on the Hoge Gouwe in Gouda and made pots on a potter's wheel at the market on Thursdays. She received an award at an exhibition in Monza.

Bouw was based in Bodegraven in 1984 and in 1991. The artist Carla Rodenberg painted two large portraits of her in 1992, one in a red blouse and one in a green blouse. Later, Bouw had to give up ceramics and sold her kiln. In 2026 she lived in Zoetermeer and painted small landscapes, always with cows.

== Work ==
Cow in terrazzo and glass mosaic, forecourt of the Wierickehuis, Nieuwerbrug

Bouw made monumental ceramics and sculptures, with an emphasis on colourful ceramics. She also gave workshops and classes, and from 2005 to 2011 she worked on coaching and community art projects. In 1986 her work was in the ceramics exhibition at the Provinciehuis (provincial government building) of South Holland in The Hague, part of Keramiek 86, a series of exhibitions of Dutch ceramics in museums, galleries and the Provinciehuis.

=== Public art ===
Her early commissions included concrete objects in a park in Capelle aan den IJssel (1970) and ceramic play objects for primary schools in Utrecht (1977) and Bodegraven (1978). A school in the A.G. de Vrijestraat in Gouda received a brick relief by her on a side wall in her early period.

Her ceramic Windbreak has stood in Middelharnis since 1986, by the former library building on the Kerkepad. In 1989 she made windbreaks for several places, including Heist-op-den-Berg and Brasschaat in Belgium. The Obelisk, also called Windbreak, in Groenendijk in Hazerswoude-Rijndijk was the last work in a plan by the Culturele Raad Hazerswoude (cultural council) to place art in the three villages of the former municipality. A member of the provincial executive of South Holland unveiled it on 21 August 1991.

In 1999 Bouw made three totems for the Diakonessenhuis hospital in Utrecht and the obelisk Life, stability, enjoyment for the Maesemunde multicultural centre in 's-Gravenzande. That year she made two reclining cows, Bontvee (pied cattle), for the Holland America Line cruise ship Zaandam. Seven reclining cows, De verandering (The change), followed in 2002 for Commerzbank in Frankfurt, and in 2003 a terrazzo cow, Sunshine, in Nieuwerbrug.

Strandstoel (Beach chair) has stood since 2006 in Ouddorp, on a roundabout in the Vrijheidsweg. It is a greatly enlarged steel beach chair with a blue frame and an orange and white seat, with a beach ball on the seat; the chair stands on a small dune. The municipality of Goedereede commissioned it as part of the project Kunst op de rotonde (Art on the roundabout), which produced three artworks. A similar work of hers with two beach chairs, We zijn er bijna (We are almost there), stands at the beach entrance in Hook of Holland.

== Gallery ==
Brick relief from 1970 to 1980, R.K. Basisschool St. Aloysius, A.G. de Vrijestraat, Gouda

Totem (1993), polychrome ceramics, Wijchen

Poortwachters (Gatekeepers, 1999), Diakonessenhuis, Bosboomstraat, Utrecht

Life, stability and enjoyment, Koningin Julianaweg, 's-Gravenzande

Windbreak, Kerkepad, Middelharnis
