= Wyco de Vries =

Dutch water polo player (born 1968)

Personal information
- Nationality: Dutch
- Born: 13 May 1968 (age 57); Bodegraven, Netherlands

Sport
- Sport: Water polo

Wyco de Vries (born 13 May 1968) is a Dutch water polo player. He competed in the men's tournament at the 1996 Summer Olympics.
