= Rotterdam–The Hague metropolitan area =

Rotterdam-The Hague metropolitan area Metropoolregio Rotterdam Den Haag
- Conurbation
- Metropolitan region Rotterdam The Hague
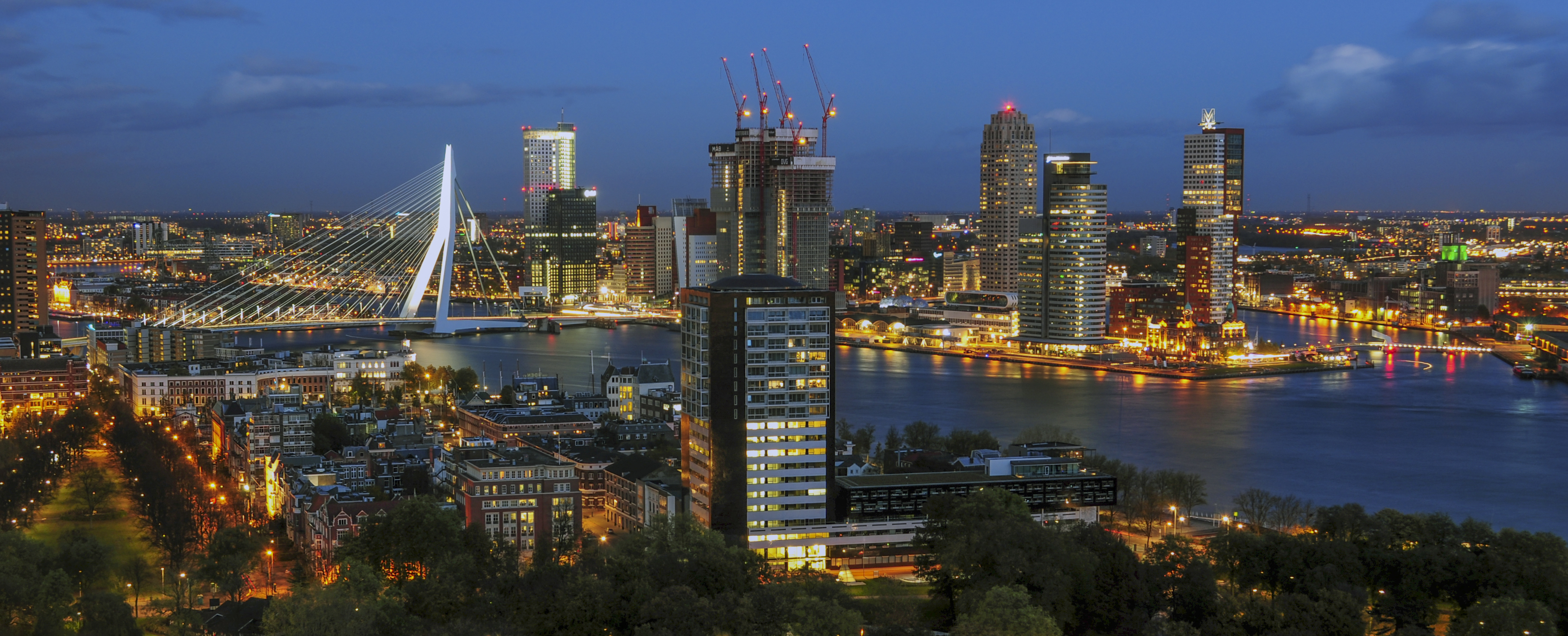
Rotterdam at dusk
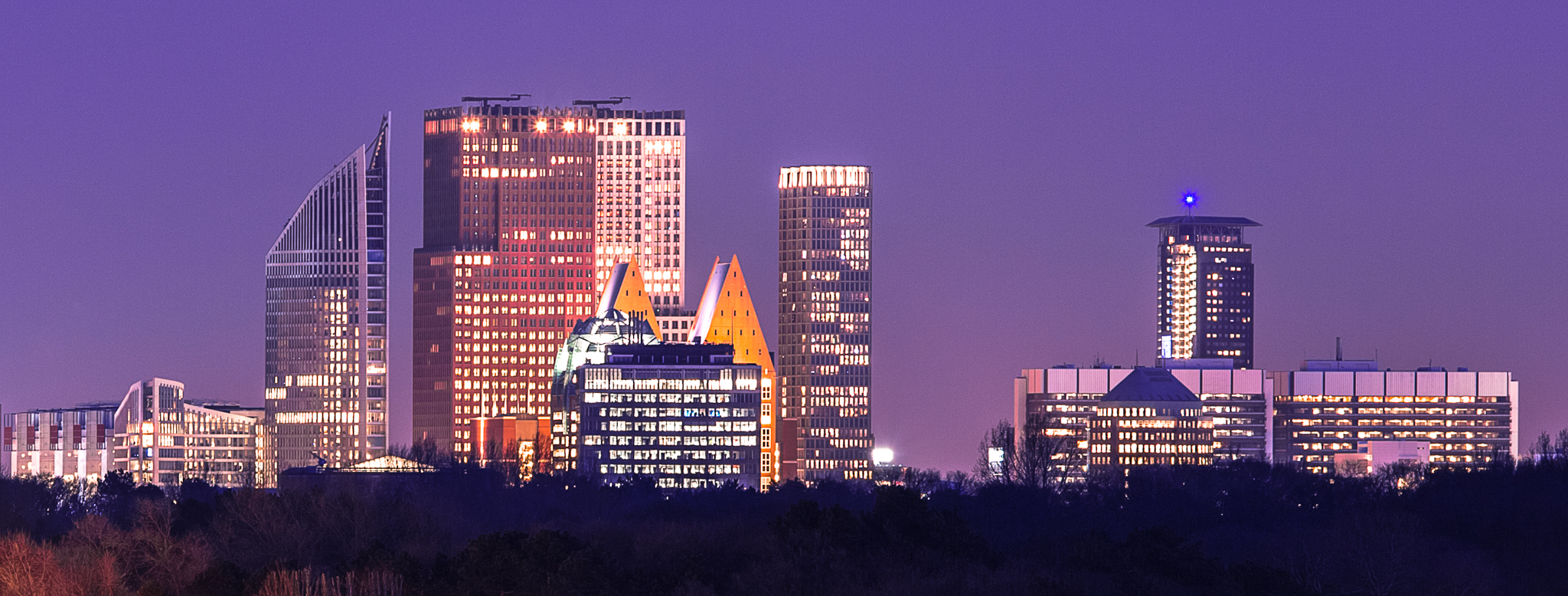
The Hague at dusk
- Location in the province of South Holland, Netherlands
- Coordinates: 51.995°N 4.385°E
- Country: Netherlands
- Province: South Holland
- Core cities: Rotterdam; The Hague
- Satellite cities: Zoetermeer; Delft

Area
  - Total: 1,256.41 km^{2} (485.10 sq mi)
- Highest elevation: 69 m (226 ft)
- Lowest elevation: −6.76 m (−22.2 ft)

Population (2026)
  - Total: 2,500,114
  - Density: 1,989.89/km^{2} (5,153.78/sq mi)

GDP
  - Total: €151.225 billion (2021)
- Website: www.mrdh.nl

The Rotterdam–The Hague metropolitan area (Dutch: Metropoolregio Rotterdam Den Haag) is a metropolitan area encompassing the cities of Rotterdam and The Hague as well as 19 other municipalities and is the tenth largest agglomeration in the European Union. It was founded in 2014. The area has a population of approximately 2.5 million across 1,256 km^{2} (485 sq mi). It is the largest European port, with many international organizations residing within its borders.

The area lies in the zuidvleugel (English: "South Wing") of the larger conurbation called Randstad. Air traffic is supported by Rotterdam The Hague Airport offering services to a number of European cities; however, the majority of air travelers use Amsterdam Airport Schiphol, which is about 45 kilometers from The Hague. Light rail public transport in the area is offered by RandstadRail, Rotterdam Metro, The Hague tram, and Rotterdam tram, heavy rail public transport is provided by the Dutch railways.

== Goal ==
The main reason for the cooperation is economic, to keep and make the area more attractive to international companies and organizations.

== Economy ==
The area has two main cores, the cities of Rotterdam and The Hague. The city of Delft is situated in between the two major cities. The area has a GDP of €170 billion. There are 2,700 foreign companies.

== Municipalities ==
The metropolitan area consists of 21 municipalities. On 1 January 2023 the former municipalities of Brielle, Hellevoetsluis and Westvoorne merged to form Voorne aan Zee.

Municipalities of the Rotterdam–The Hague metropolitan area
Municipality	Population (1 January 2026)	Total area (km^{2})
Rotterdam	673,804	324.14
The Hague	569,468	98.12
Zoetermeer	130,836	37.05
Westland	118,874	90.74
Delft	110,089	24.06
Nissewaard	89,112	83.79
Schiedam	81,931	19.86
Leidschendam-Voorburg	78,916	35.62
Vlaardingen	77,480	26.69
Voorne aan Zee	75,012	189.83
Capelle aan den IJssel	69,698	15.40
Lansingerland	66,633	56.39
Rijswijk	61,857	14.50
Pijnacker-Nootdorp	58,741	38.62
Barendrecht	48,701	21.73
Ridderkerk	48,084	25.26
Maassluis	37,125	10.12
Krimpen aan den IJssel	29,864	8.95
Wassenaar	27,975	62.40
Albrandswaard	26,559	23.76
Midden-Delfland	19,355	49.38
Total	2,500,114	1,256.41
