= Meije, Netherlands =

De Meije
- Village
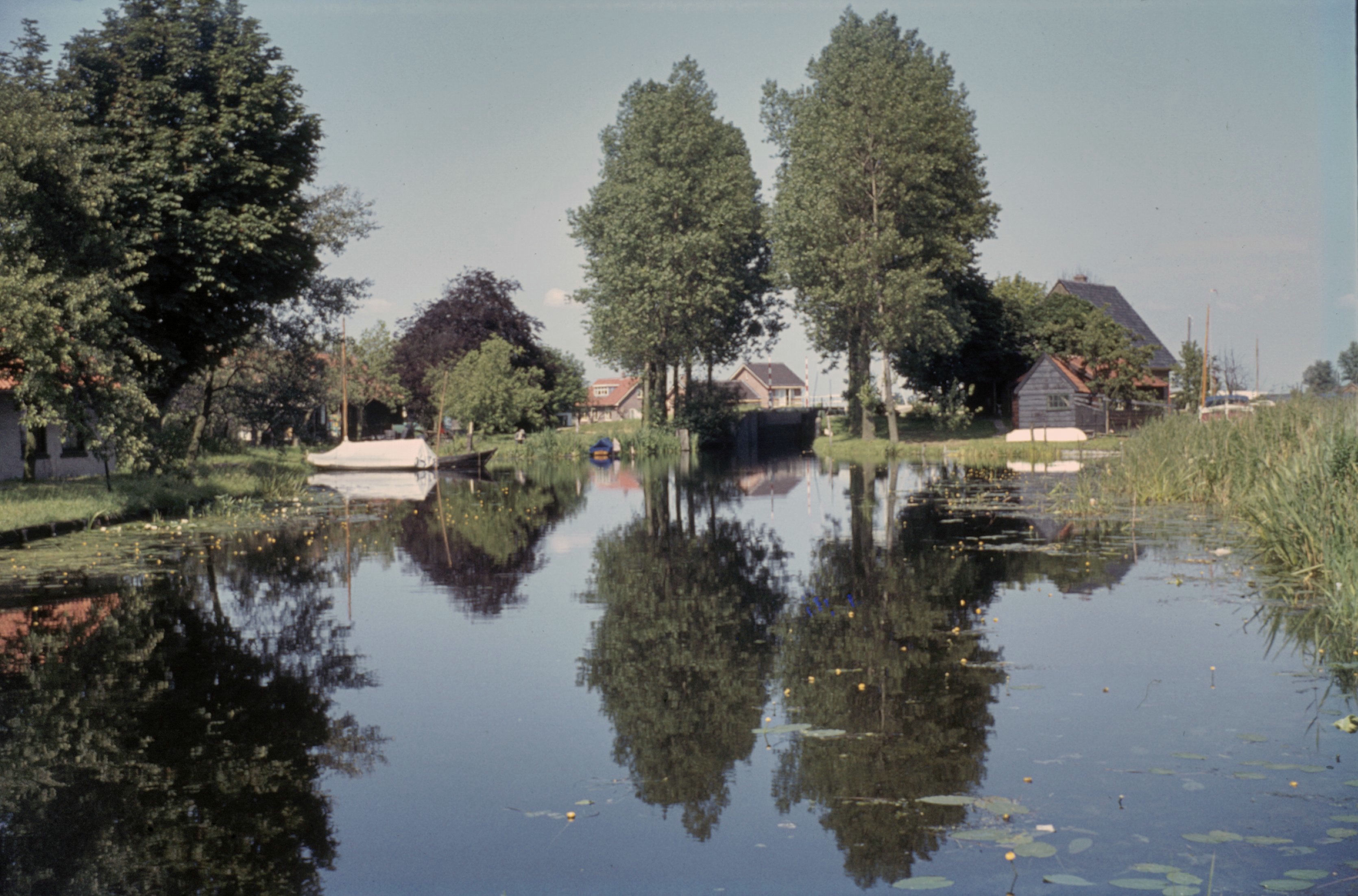
- De Meije near the lock

- Location in the Netherlands De Meije (Utrecht (province)) De Meije (Netherlands)
- Coordinates: 52°07′15″N 4°47′35″E
- Country: Netherlands
- Province: Utrecht, South Holland
- Municipality: Bodegraven-Reeuwijk, Nieuwkoop, Woerden

Area
  - Total: 7.78 km^{2} (3.00 sq mi)

Population (2008)
  - Total: 405
  - Density: 52.1/km^{2} (135/sq mi)
- Time zone: UTC+1 (CET)
  - Summer (DST): UTC+2 (CEST)
- Postal code: 2411
- Dialing code: 0172

De Meije or Bodegraafse Meije is a village in the Dutch province of South Holland and has a second part, de Zegveldse or Stichtse Meije in the province of Utrecht. The first is a part of the former municipality of Bodegraven, and lies about 7 km northwest of Woerden. Bodegraven has made part of the new municipality of Bodegraven-Reeuwijk since 2011. The second is part of the municipality of Woerden. A third part, across the little river De Meije, belongs to the municipality Nieuwkoop.

The Bodegraafse "Meije", which also includes the surrounding farmlands, has a population of around 420.

== Village ==
In the village of De Meije are two elementary schools, a catholic church, and a pub that is often frequented by water tourists that use the small river (also called De Meije) that flows along the village. This water is connected to both the river Oude Rijn and the lake Nieuwkoopse Plassen.

== Tower ==
The most remarkable building in de Meije is the tall grey water tower, called Het Potlood (the Pencil). It rises high above the flat polder area and can be seen from many towns and villages in the area.

== Gallery ==
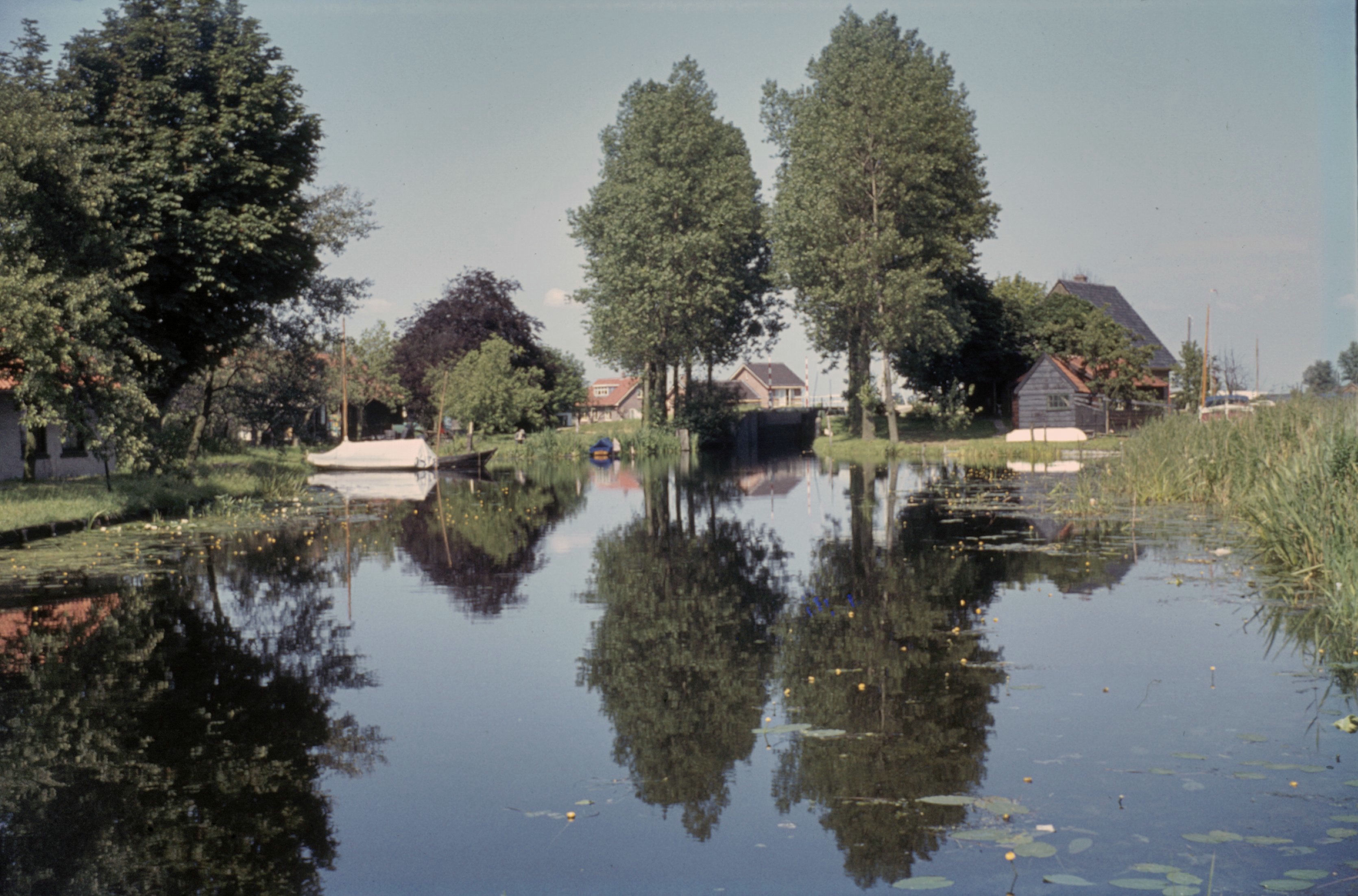
De Meije near the lock

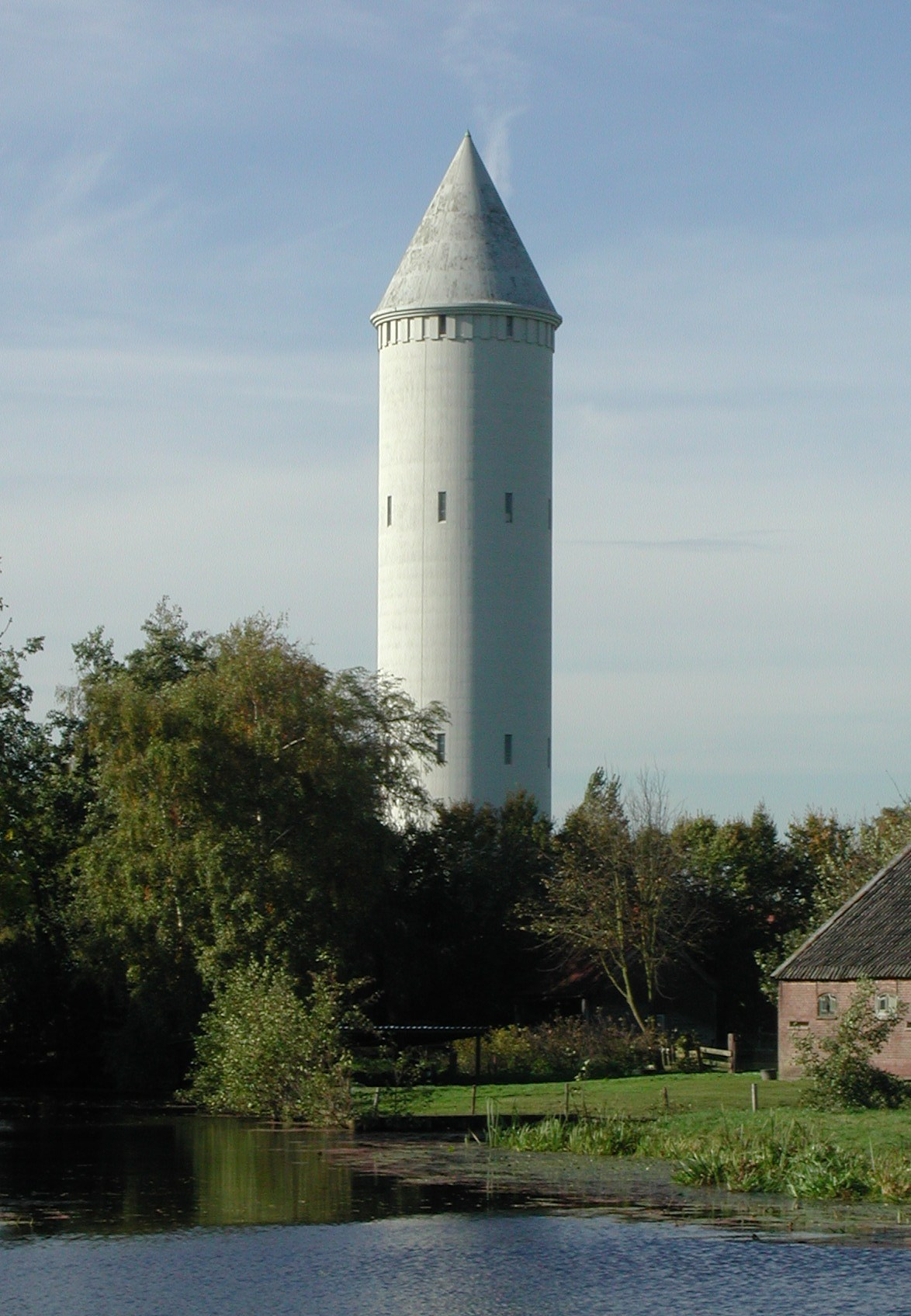
Water tower Het Potlood (the Pencil)

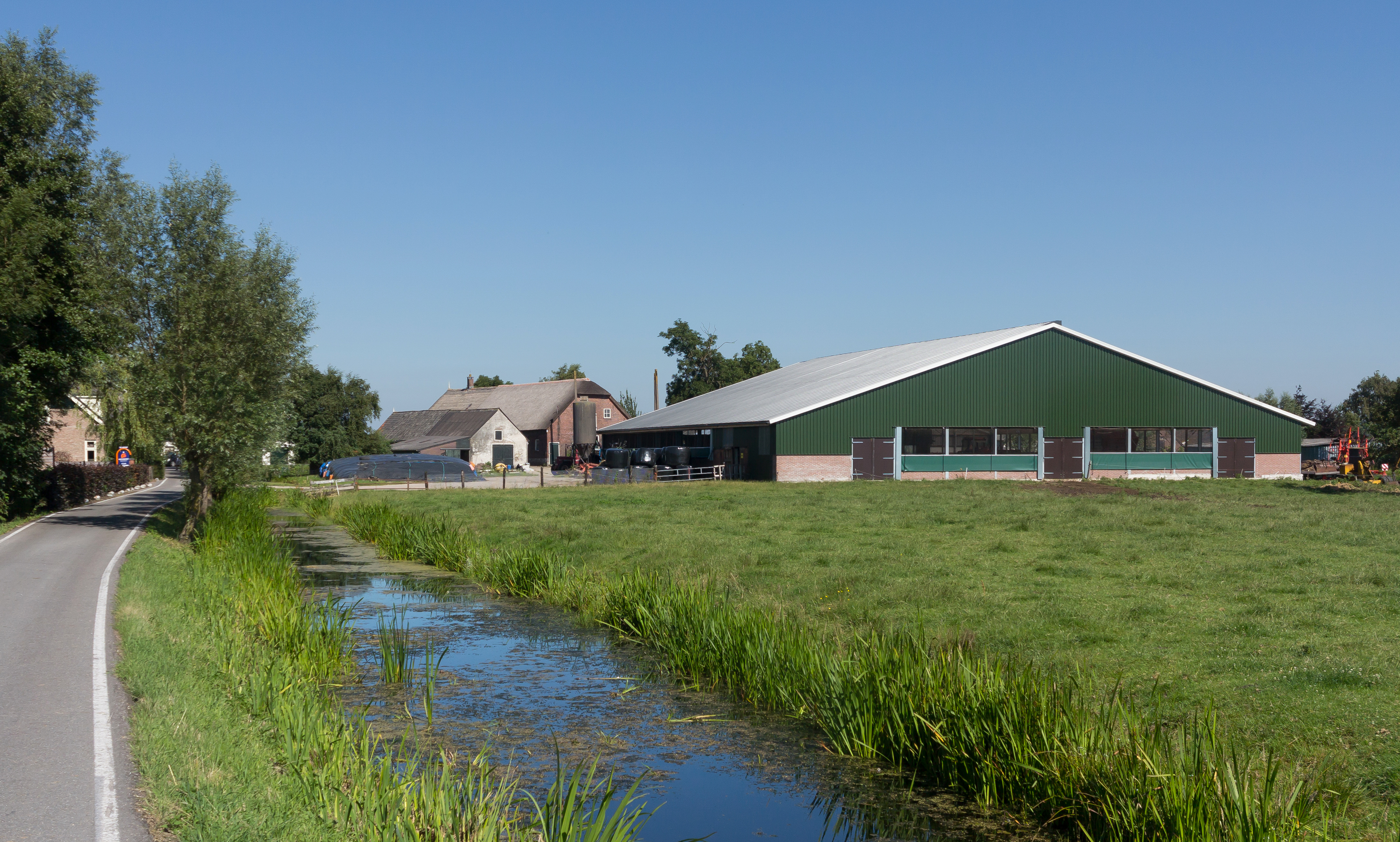
Farm in Meije

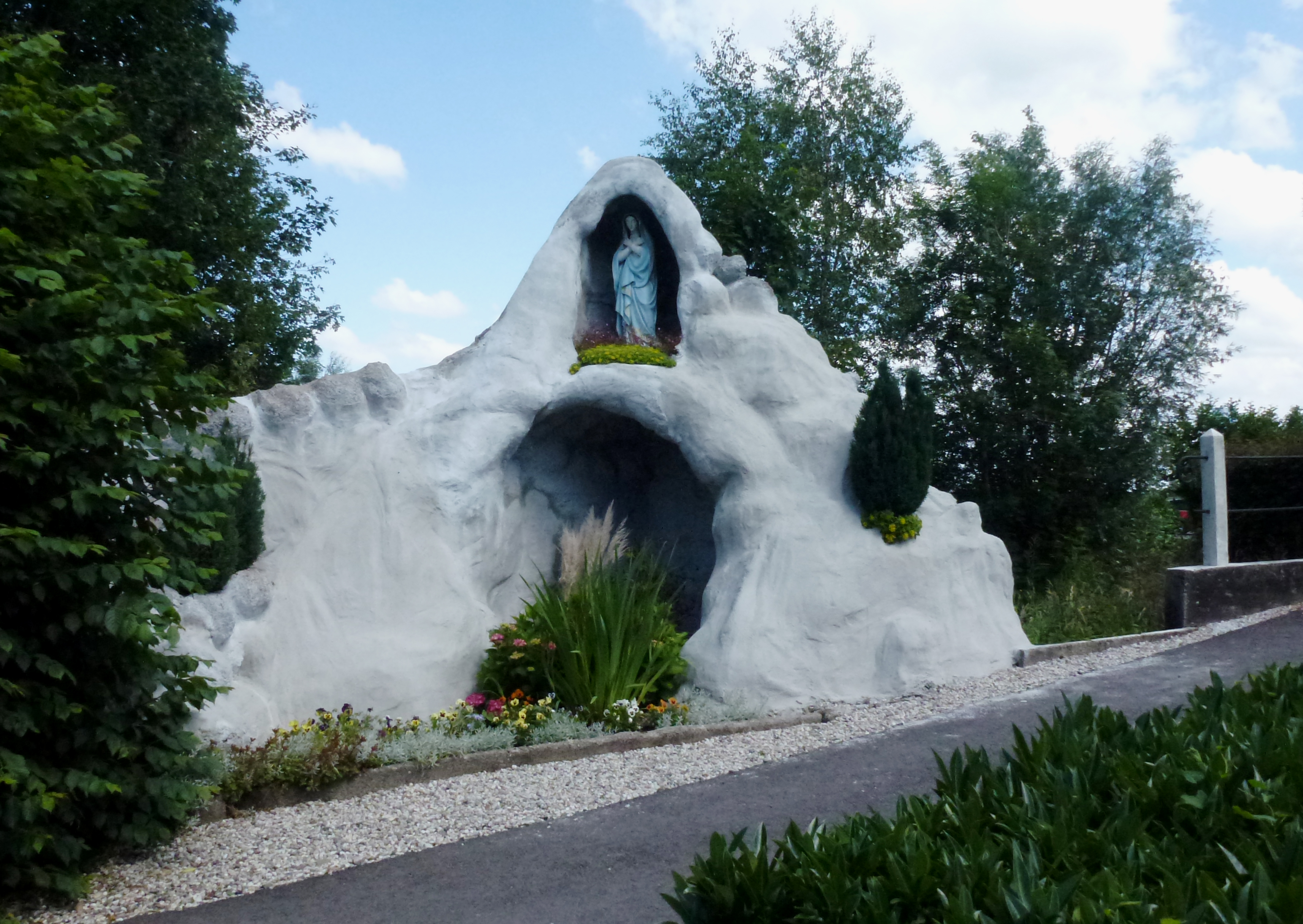
Mary chapel
