= Loet =

Loet is a masculine given name. Notable people with the name include:

- Loet Geutjes (born 1943), Dutch water polo player
- Loet Leydesdorff (1948–2023), Dutch sociologist
- Loet Shinawatra (1919–1997), Thai politician
