= Nieuwerbrug =

Nieuwerbrug Nieuwerbrug aan de Rijn
- Village
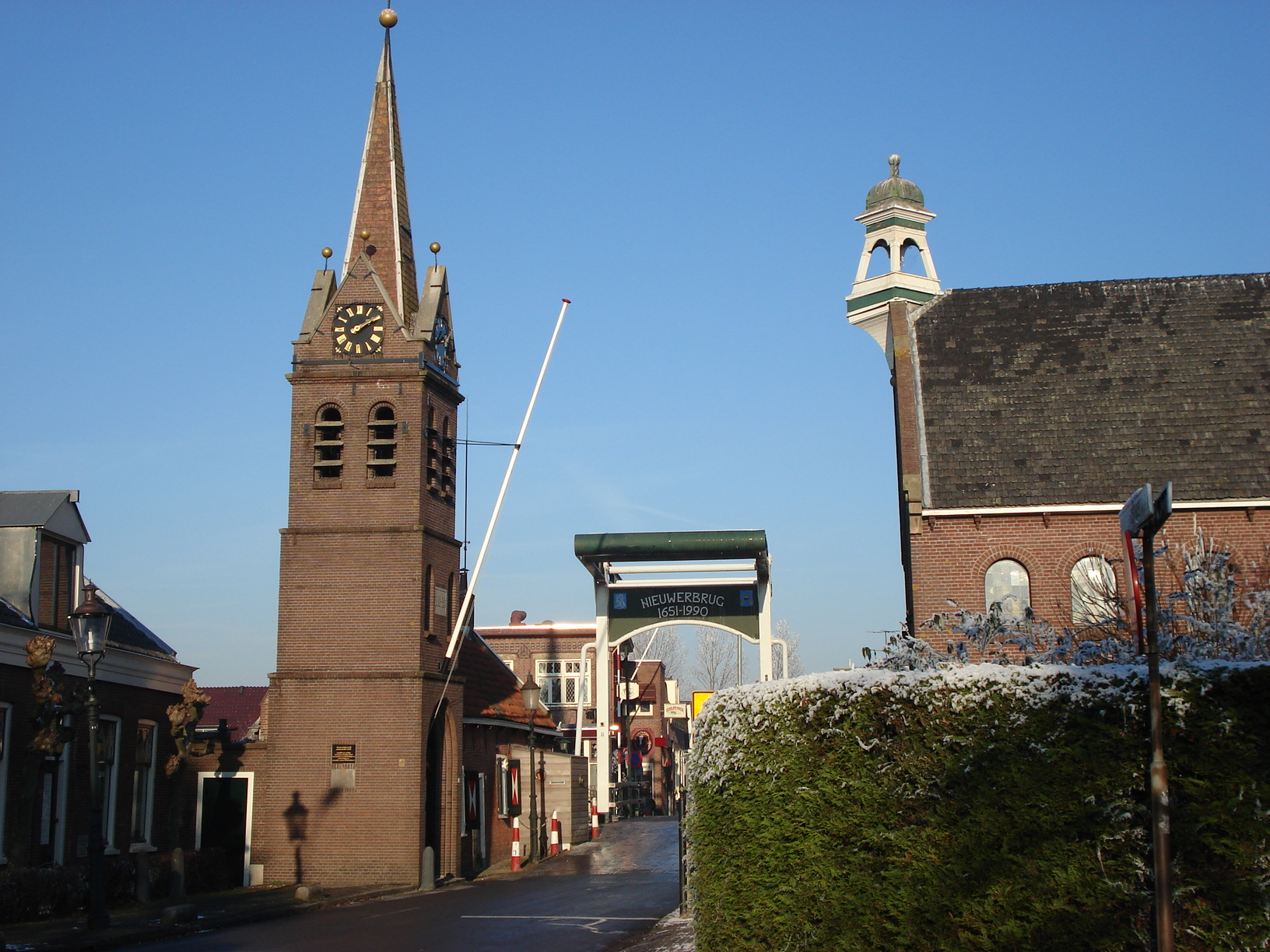
- Centre of Nieuwerbrug with the church and toll bridge

- Location in the province of South Holland in the Netherlands Location in the Netherlands
- Coordinates: 52°4′37″N 4°48′56″E
- Country: Netherlands
- Province: South Holland
- Municipality: Bodegraven-Reeuwijk

Area
  - Total: 12.02 km^{2} (4.64 sq mi)
- Elevation: 0.3 m (0.98 ft)

Population (2021)
  - Total: 1,790
  - Density: 149/km^{2} (386/sq mi)
- Time zone: UTC+1 (CET)
  - Summer (DST): UTC+2 (CEST)
- Postal code: 2415
- Dialing code: 0348

Nieuwerbrug (also Nieuwerbrug aan de Rijn) is a village in the Dutch province of South Holland. It is a part of the former municipality of Bodegraven, and lies about five kilometres west of Woerden. Bodegraven has become part of the municipality of Bodegraven-Reeuwijk in 2011. Nieuwerbrug aan de Rijn is the spelling since 2009 to distinguish from Nieuwebrug in Friesland.

Nieuwerbrug is a dike village which developed along the bridge over the Oude Rijn which was built in 1510. The bridge became a toll bridge from 1651 to the present. A little tower was built next to the bridge between 1913 and 1914.

== Gallery ==
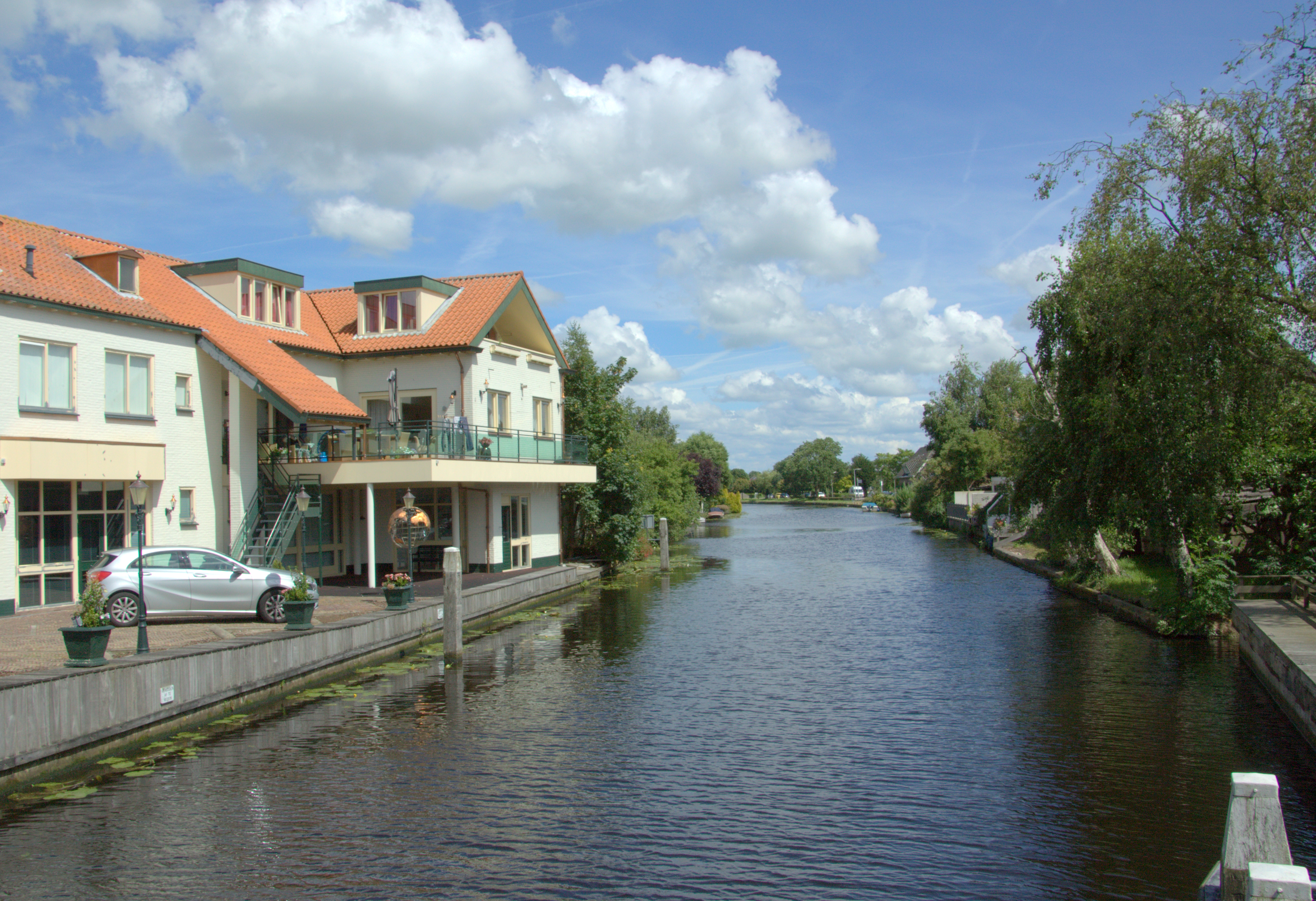
View from the bridge

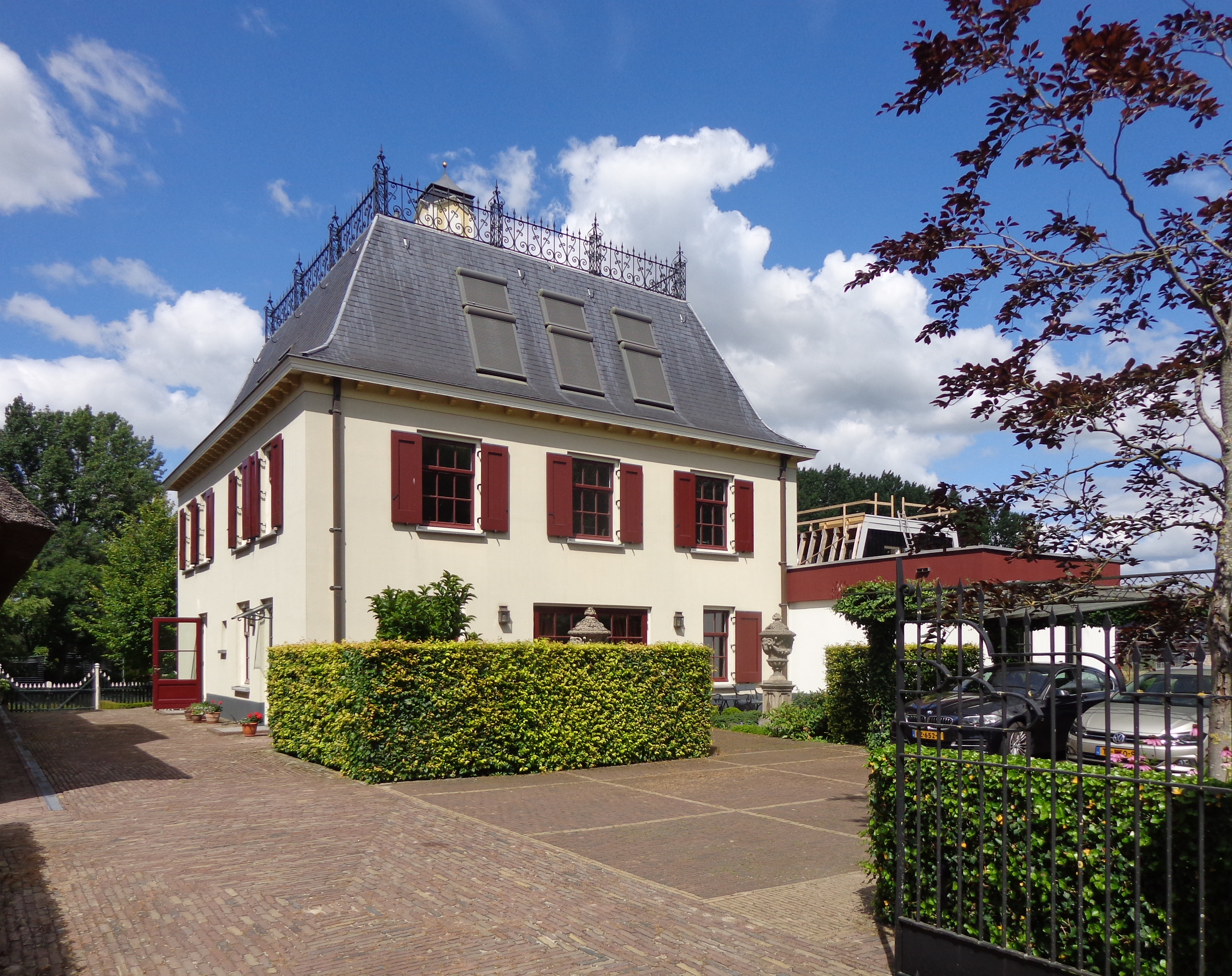
Villa Weijpoort

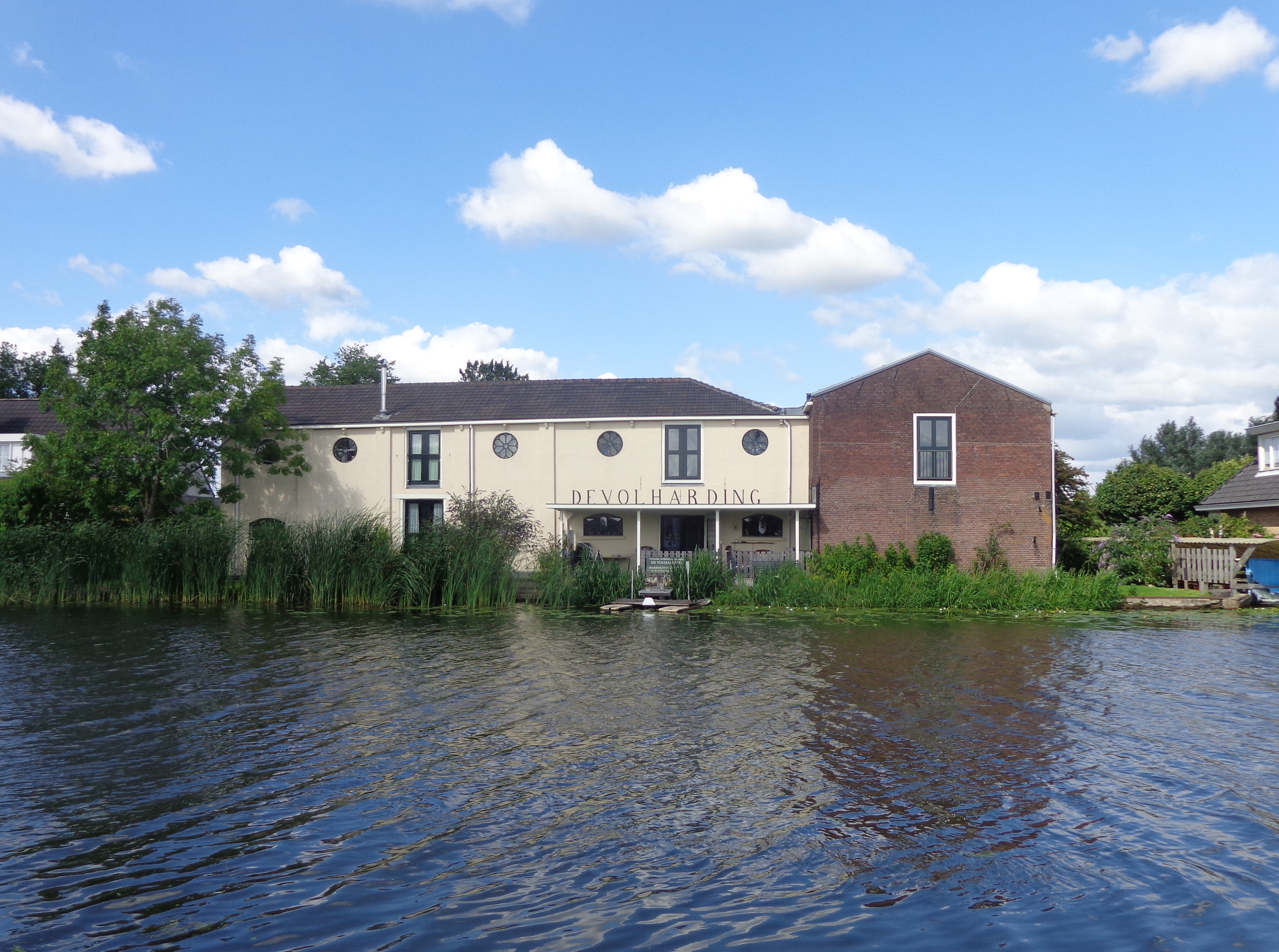
De Volharding
