= Bodegraven =

- Town
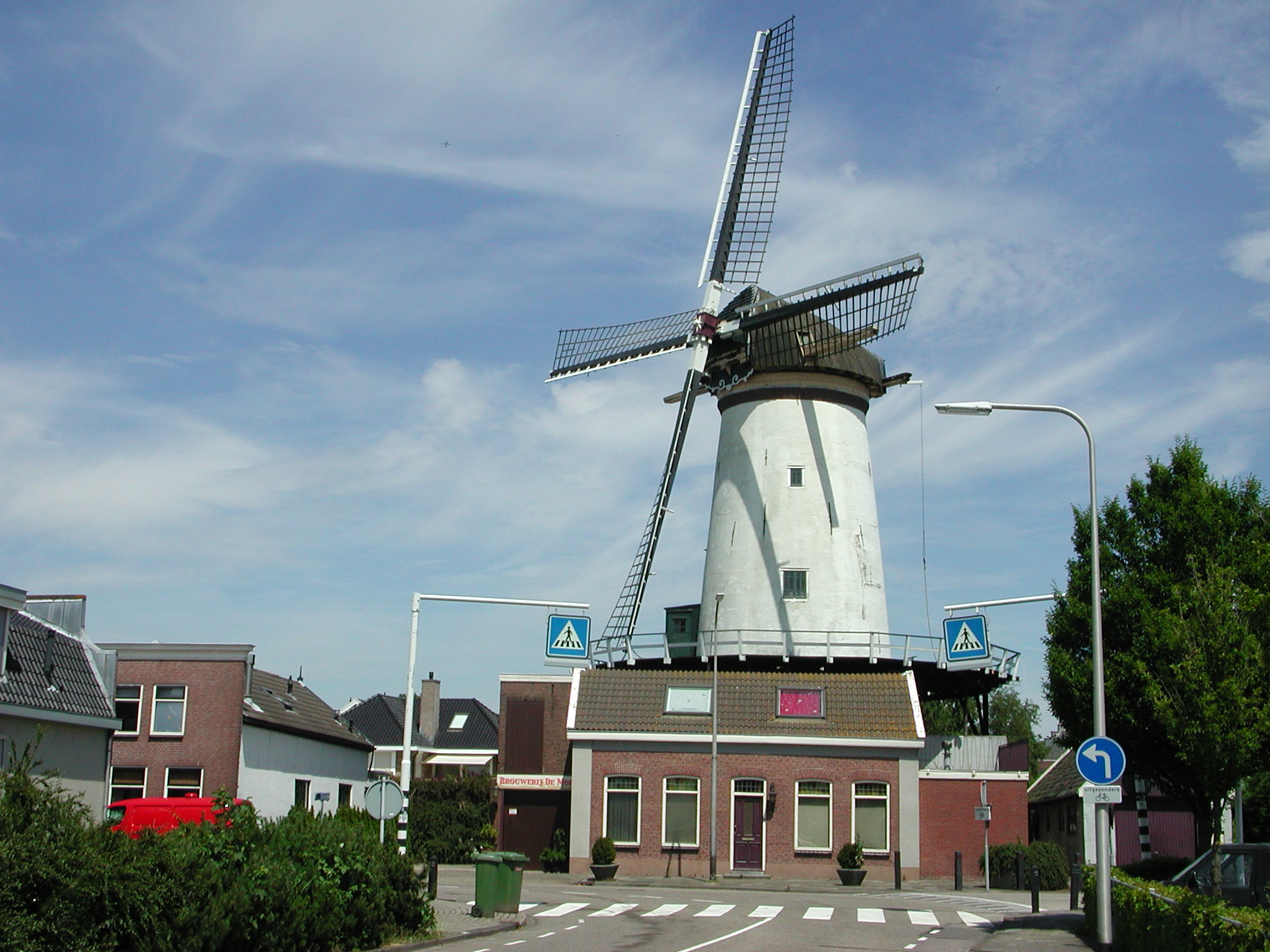
- Windmill De Arkduif

- Flag Coat of arms

- Location in the province of South Holland in the Netherlands Location in the Netherlands
- Coordinates: 52.0822°N 4.7504°E
- Country: Netherlands
- Province: South Holland
- Municipality: Bodegraven-Reeuwijk

Area
  - Total: 26.58 km^{2} (10.26 sq mi)
- Elevation: 0.7 m (2.3 ft)

Population (2021)
  - Total: 19,280
  - Density: 725.4/km^{2} (1,879/sq mi)
- Time zone: UTC+1 (CET)
  - Summer (DST): UTC+2 (CEST)
- Postal code: 2411
- Dialing code: 0172

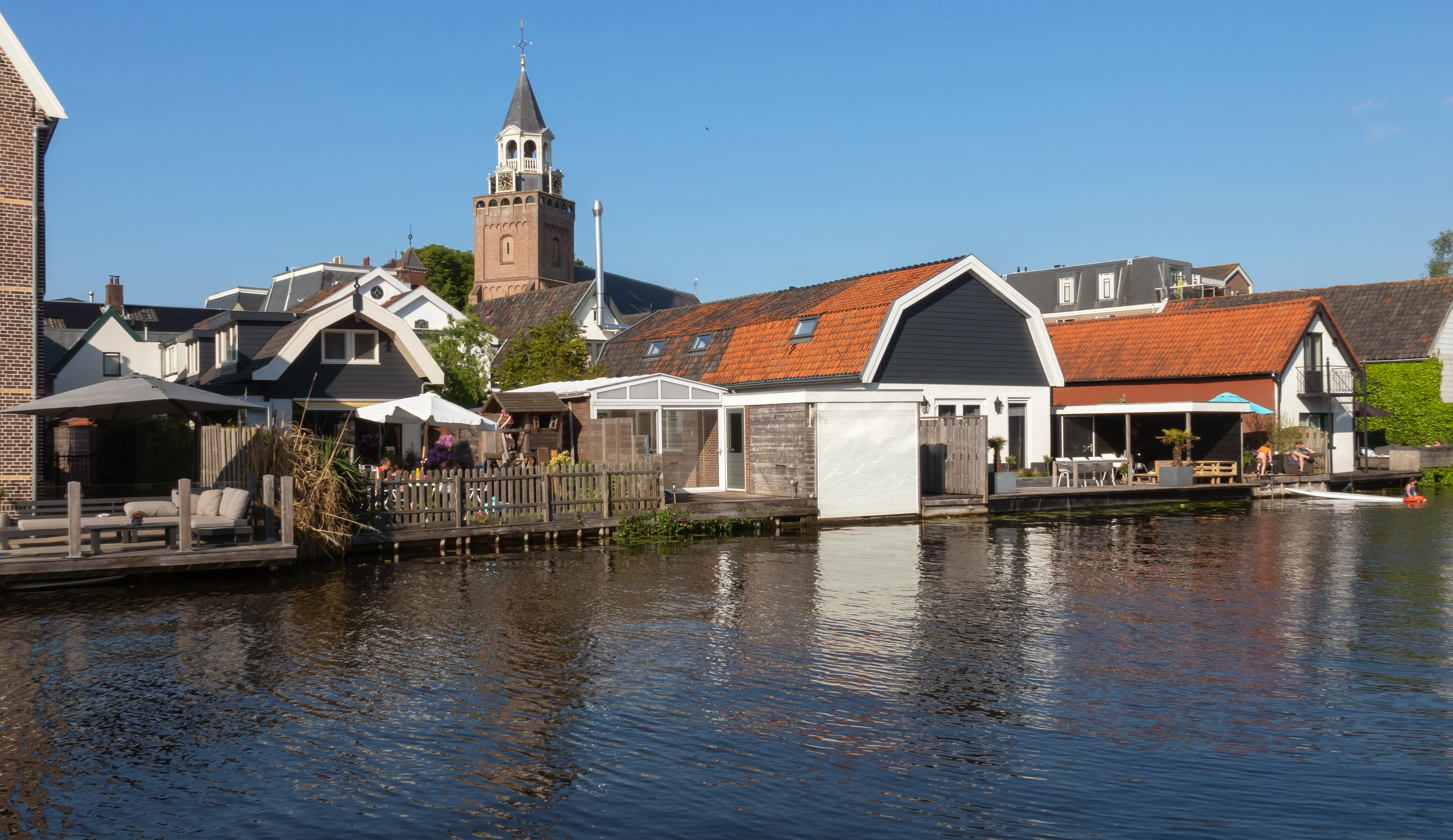
Bodegraven, church (the Sint Galluskerk) from the Oude Rijn

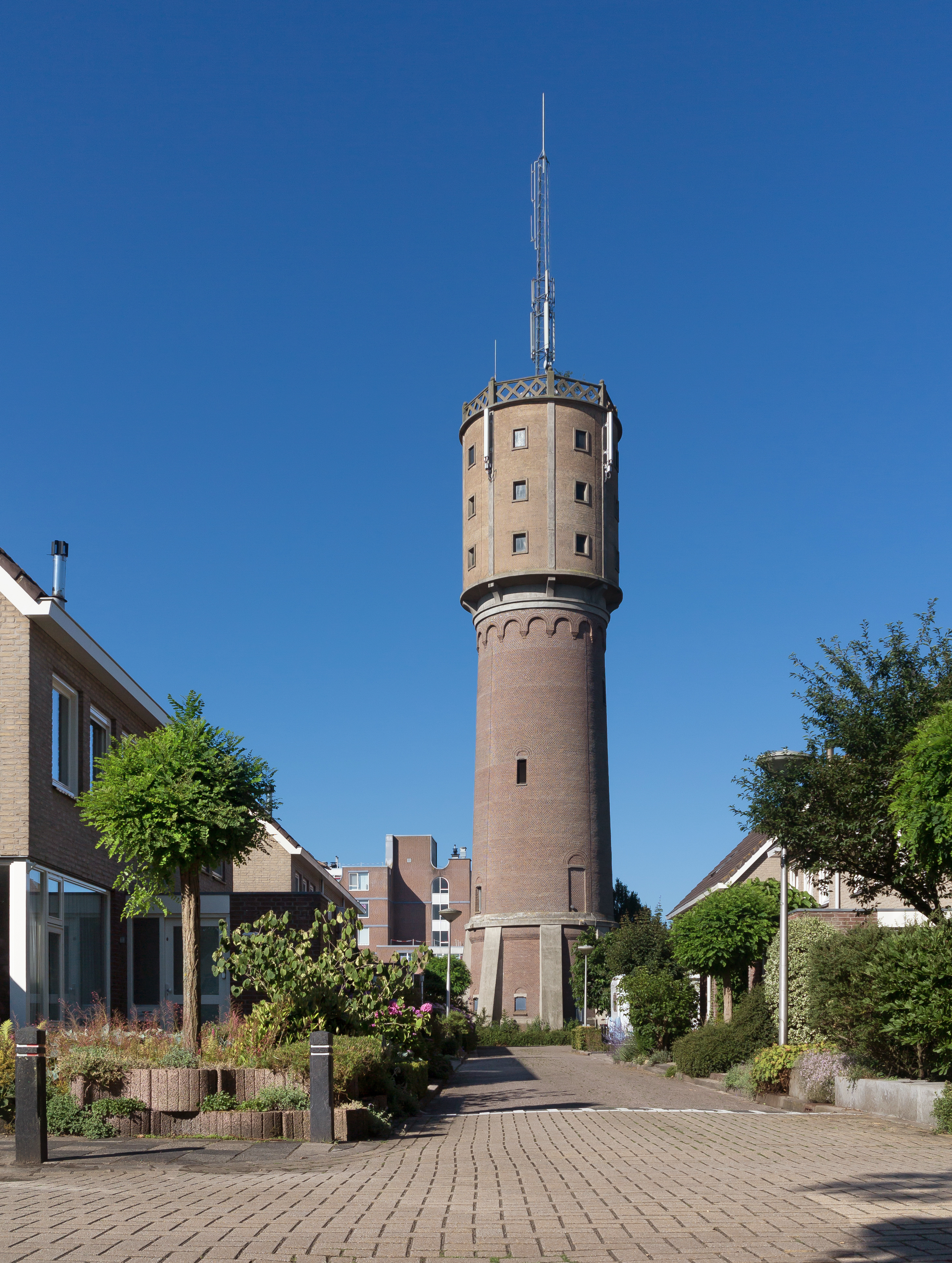
Bodegraven, watertower

Bodegraven (Dutch pronunciation: [ˈboːdəˌɣraːvə(n)]) is a town and former municipality in the western Netherlands, in the province of South Holland. The former municipality covers an area of 38.50 km^{2} (14.86 sq mi) of which 1.02 km^{2} (0.39 sq mi) is water.

The former municipality of Bodegraven also includes the communities Meije, and Nieuwerbrug.

On January 1, 2011, Bodegraven merged with Reeuwijk to Bodegraven-Reeuwijk.

== Geography ==
Bodegraven is centrally located in the Green Heart of the Randstad, roughly equally distant (about 30 km) from Amsterdam, Rotterdam, The Hague, and Utrecht. It is surrounded by the municipalities (clockwise, starting in the north): Nieuwkoop, Woerden, Reeuwijk (former municipality), Boskoop, and Alphen aan den Rijn.

The town is situated on both shores of the Oude Rijn, in which a set of locks are in the middle of town. The oldest part of town is the Reformed St. Gallus Church, on the north side of the river.

== History ==
Bodegraven was already inhabited in the Roman Era. It was situated at the Roman Empire's northern border, the Limes Germanicus. As such, many army camps, ports, and roads were built by the Romans. Many settlements originated on the road along the Limes, including Bodegraven.

Not much is known about Bodegraven after that. According to folklore, a lost map from 809 made reference to a fiefdom "Bodelo". There is certainty however that circa 1050 a small settlement had formed, probably near the current Dorpskerk (Village Church). After two centuries of dispute between the bishop of Utrecht and the Counts of Holland, Bodegraven eventually became part of Holland.

In the late Middle Ages, large tracts of land around Bodegraven were prepared for cultivation by digging division ditches (kavelsloten) perpendicular to the rivers (such as Oude Rijn, Meije, and Oude Bodegrave) between land parcels and then ditches cross-wise some 1,250 meters (4,100 feet) from and parallel to the rivers (achtersloten). This created the distinctive grid pattern of field divisions. Circa 1350, a lock was built at Bodegraven.

In 1672 when war was declared between the Dutch Republic and England, France, Münster, and Cologne, Bodegraven was just behind the Water Defense Line. The Water Line was inundated and formed a barrier to the advancing French troops. But during the winter the French could advance over the frozen polders to Meije and Zwammerdam. Before reaching Alphen aan den Rijn they could be repelled by the Dutch. Thaw had set in so the only retreat route was along the dike of the Oude Rijn. The French therefore came through Bodegraven and destroyed it. Afterwards, the fort Wierickerschans was built just east of the town.

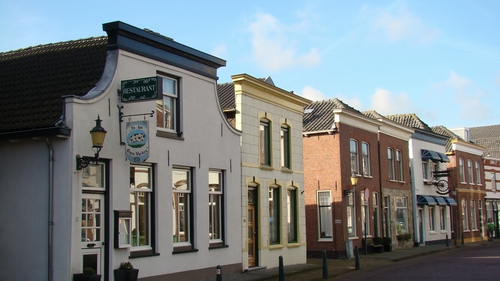
Street scene in Bodegraven.

Until 1870 Bodegraven prospered. But in that year fire broke out in a bakery which subsequently burnt a large part of the town. In all a 100 homes had burnt down and 130 families were homeless. A national collection was held and the town quickly recovered.

In the 20th century, Bodegraven expanded: the southside between the Oude Rijn and the railway was built up circa 1900, the northside between the World Wars, and since the 1950s the area between the railway and the A12 Motorway has been built up.

== Economy ==
Bodegraven is known as a centre for the cheese trade, controlled by the powerful Goebel family, though the number of cheese warehouses has decreased and, the Tuesday Cheese Market is no longer held since 2001. There still is a cheese museum and a cheese monument in front of the church.

It was also known for its shampoo because of the Andrélon Factory, founded in the 1940s by barber André de Jong. In 2005 the factory closed and was demolished.

Bodegraven has a strategic location in the middle of the Green Heart, resulting in a relative high number of industries located here.

There is a picturesque historic windmill located in the town, which dates from the late seventeenth century and is now known as "De Arkduif" (the 'ark-dove' of the biblical Noah's Ark story). This currently houses a small brewery called Brouwerij De Molen.

== Transportation ==
The A12 Motorway, running next to Bodegraven, connects The Hague via Utrecht and Arnhem to the German border. The State Highway N11 connects the A12 with the A4 Motorway at Leiden.

=== Railway ===
Railway Station: Bodegraven. There is a train between Leiden and Utrecht stopping in Bodegraven, four times an hour.

=== Bus ===
There is only one bus (Line 178) in Bodegraven, connecting it with Reeuwijk and Gouda. A local bus (Line 724) drives between the communities Bodegraven, Zwammerdam, De Meije, Zegveld, Woerden, Nieuwerbrug, and back to Bodegraven. A second local bus (Line 722) connects Alphen aan den Rijn and Bodegraven via Zwammerdam. A steam tram formerly ran between Bodegraven and Gouda. Between 1892 and 1917 it used horses instead of steam locomotives.

== Notable people ==
- Wyco de Vries - Water polo player (1996 Summer Olympics)
