= Zuidvleugel =

Band of towns in Southern Netherlands

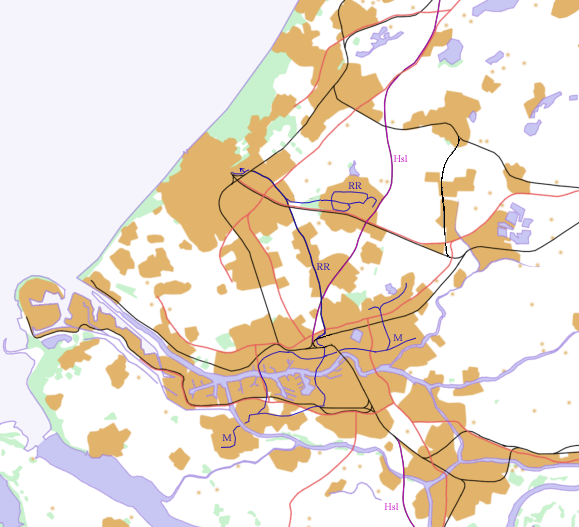
A map of the Zuidvleugel, with The Hague in the north-west and Rotterdam in the south-east.

The Zuidvleugel (Dutch pronunciation: [ˈzœytˌfløːɣəl], literally "south wing") is the band of cities and towns located along the southern wing of the Randstad in the Netherlands. It is that part of the Randstad that is located in the Province of South Holland. This developing conurbation extends around 60 kilometres from Dordrecht to Leiden. The two main focal points are the area around Rotterdam (called Rijnmond) and the area around The Hague (called Haaglanden).

With a population of around 3.5 million people, the Zuidvleugel is one of the largest urban areas in Europe.

The centre of the Zuidvleugel lies in the middle of Rotterdam and The Hague, near Delft.

Zuidvleugel includes the following:

- the Drechtsteden and some more of the Hoeksche Waard: Binnenmaas, Oud-Beijerland
- the region of Zuid-Holland West
- the Rijnmond area around Rotterdam
- the Haaglanden area around The Hague
- a small part of the region of Zuid-Holland Oost: Gorinchem, Hardinxveld-Giessendam

Consideration is being given to creating a Rotterdam-The Hague metropolitan region. This would be the centre of the Zuidvleugel, which is larger and includes other towns like Dordrecht and Leiden.

The Noordvleugel (North Wing) of the Randstad is centred on the area around Amsterdam (called Amstelland).

== See also ==
- Rotterdam
- The Hague
