= Randstad =

Conurbation in the western Netherlands

Randstad Randstad Regio
- Conurbation
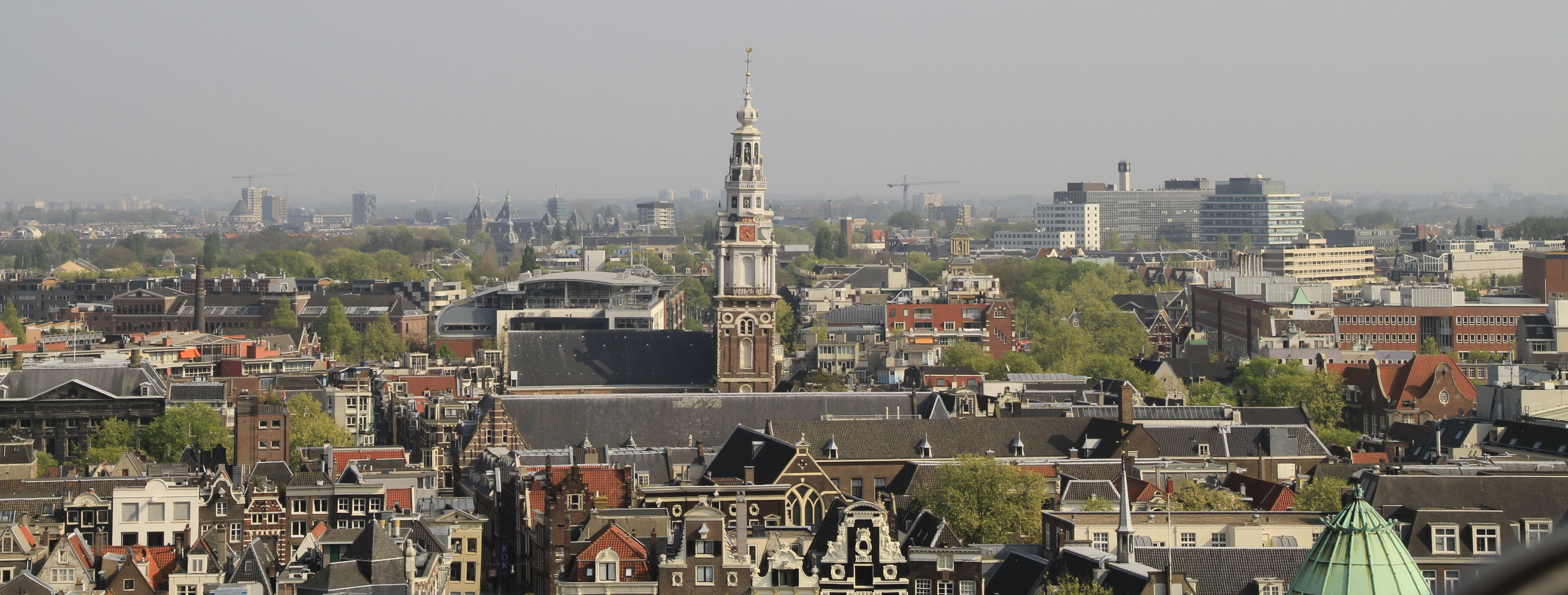
- Amsterdam, the Netherlands' capital and largest city

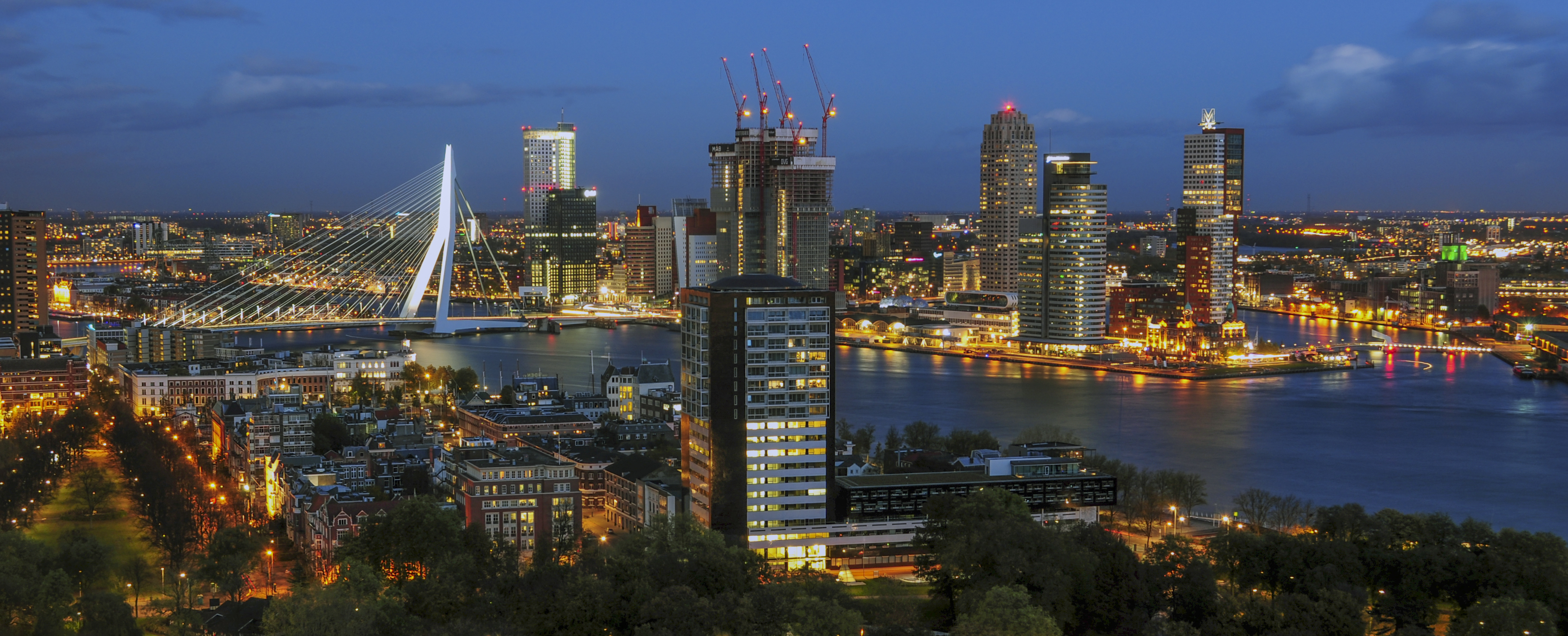
- Rotterdam, second largest city in the Netherlands
- Interactive map of Randstad
- Coordinates: 52.19083°N 4.65556°E
- Country: Netherlands
- Provinces: Flevoland; North Holland; South Holland; Utrecht
- Largest cities: Amsterdam; Rotterdam; The Hague; Utrecht
- Other municipalities: Almere; Haarlem; Haarlemmermeer; Zaanstad; Zoetermeer; Leiden; Dordrecht; Alphen aan den Rijn; Westland; Delft

Area^{[a]}
  - Conurbation: 11,372.15 km^{2} (4,390.81 sq mi)
  - Land: 8,261.98 km^{2} (3,189.97 sq mi)
  - Water: 3,110.17 km^{2} (1,200.84 sq mi)
  - Urban: 6,296.91 km^{2} (2,431.25 sq mi)
- Highest elevation: 69 m (226 ft)
- Lowest elevation: −6.76 m (−22.2 ft)

Population (1 January 2021)^{[b]}
  - Conurbation: 8,403,915
  - Density: 738.99/km^{2} (1,914.0/sq mi)
  - Urban: 7,146,249
  - Urban density: 1,134.88/km^{2} (2,939.3/sq mi)
- Demonym(s): Randstedeling (inhabitant), Randstedelijk (adjective)

GDP
  - Conurbation: €602.711 billion (2024)
  - Per capita: €71,700 (2024)
- Website: Regio-Randstad.eu/

The Randstad (Dutch pronunciation: [ˈrɑntstɑt]; "Rim City" or "Edge City") is a roughly crescent- or arc-shaped conurbation in the Netherlands, that includes almost half the country's population. With a central-western location, it connects and comprises the Netherlands' four biggest cities (Amsterdam, Rotterdam, The Hague, and Utrecht), their suburbs, and many towns in between, that all grew and merged into each other. Among other things, it includes the Port of Rotterdam (the world's busiest seaport outside Asia), the Port of Amsterdam (Europe's fourth-busiest seaport), and Amsterdam Airport Schiphol (Europe's fourth-busiest airport). With a population of approximately 8.4 million people it is one of the largest metropolitan regions in Europe,^{[b]} comparable in population size to the Rhine-Ruhr metropolitan region or the San Francisco Bay Area, and covers an area of approximately 11,372 km^{2} (4,391 sq mi).^{[a]} The Randstad had a gross regional domestic product of €510 billion in 2022, making it the second most productive region in the European Union, only behind the Paris metropolitan area. It encompasses both the Amsterdam metropolitan area and Rotterdam–The Hague metropolitan area. It is part of the larger Blue Banana megalopolis.

The Randstad's main cities are Almere, Amsterdam, Delft, Dordrecht, Haarlem, The Hague, Leiden, Rotterdam, and Utrecht. Other cities and towns include Alkmaar, Alphen aan den Rijn, Amersfoort, Amstelveen, Capelle aan den IJssel, Gouda, Heerhugowaard, Hilversum, Hoofddorp, Hoorn, Lelystad, Nieuwegein, Purmerend, Rijswijk, Schiedam, Spijkenisse, Vlaardingen, Zaandam, Zeist, and Zoetermeer.

Although the name Randstad is often translated into English as "edge city" or "border city", a more accurate translation would be "rim city". The Dutch name was coined in 1938 by KLM founder Albert Plesman who, while flying over the region, used it to describe a strip of cities at the rim of a large green agricultural area (the Green Heart). While technically more of a crescent (the southeastern edge of the rim is significantly less populated), the ring shape formed by connecting the four major cities of the region led to the use of the name "Ring City".

== Geography ==
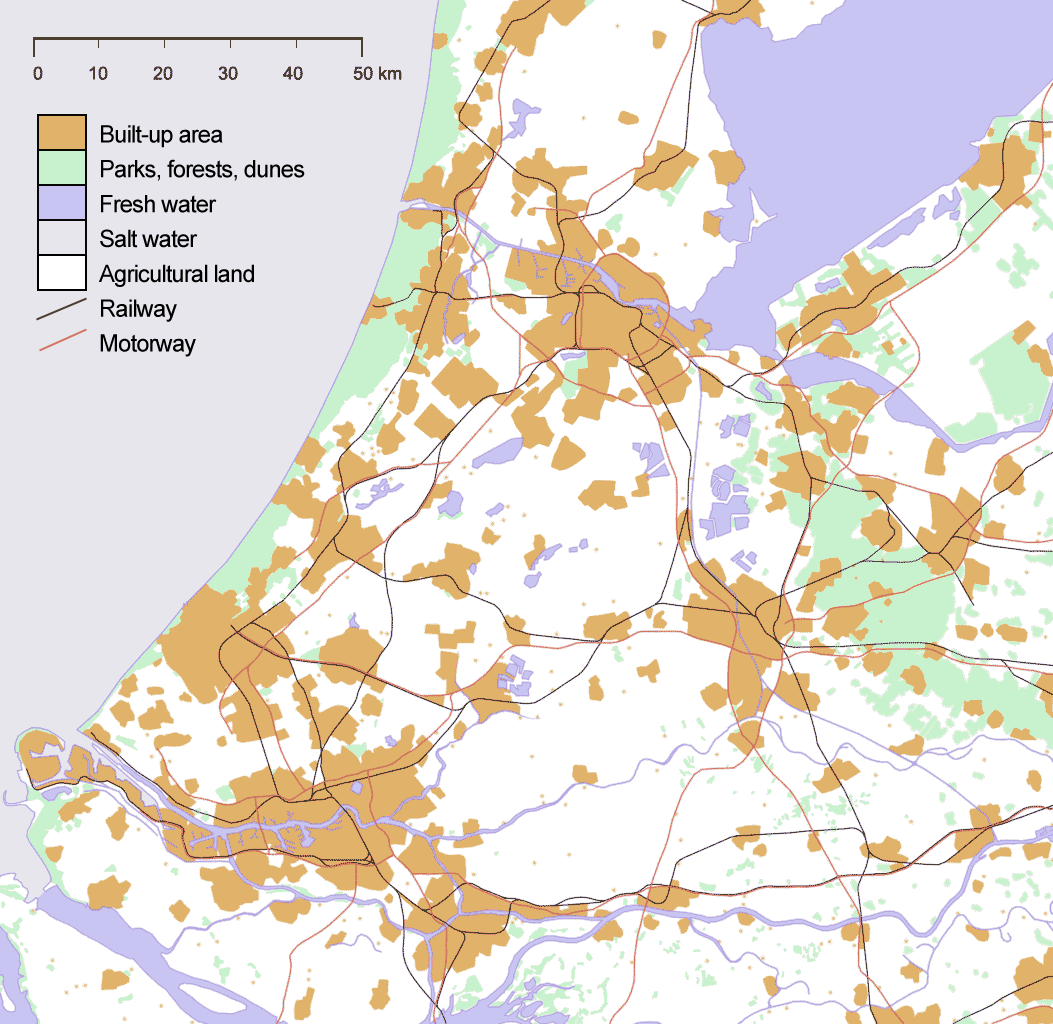
Schematic map of the Randstad

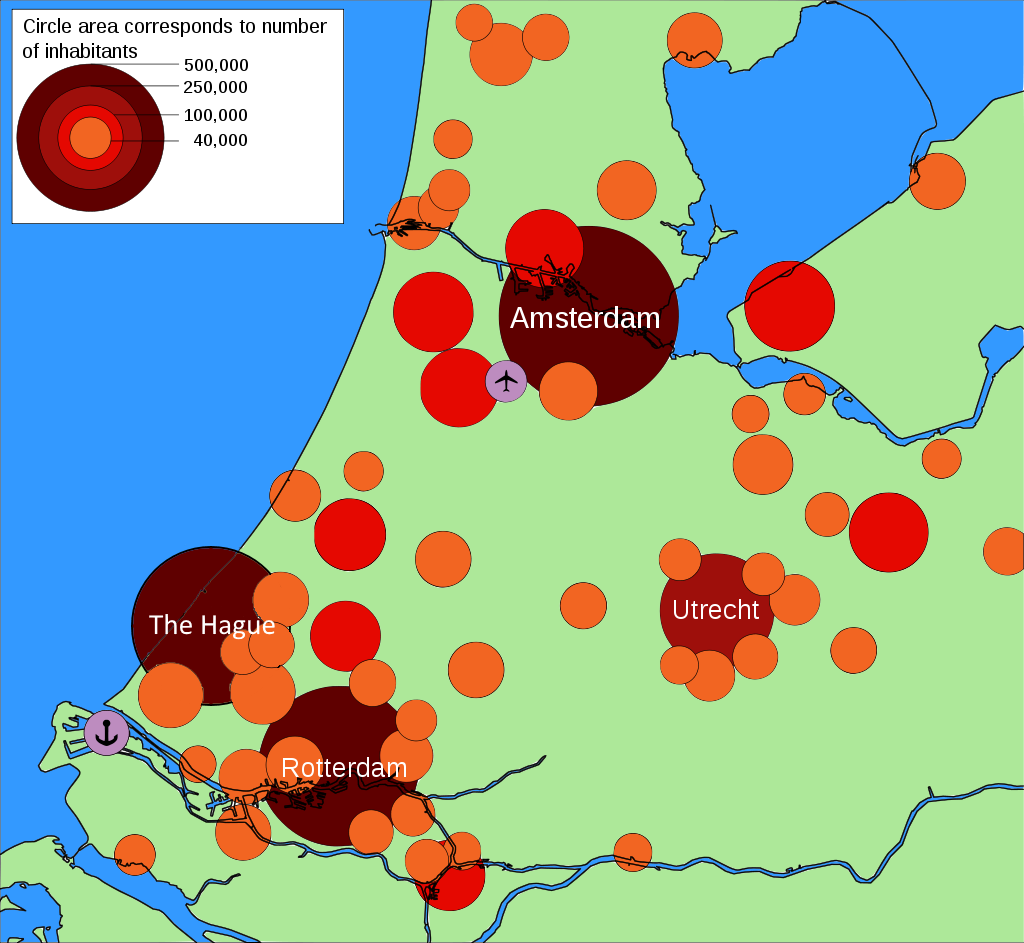
Bubble map showing the population sizes of larger towns and cities in the Randstad circa 2012

Recently, Dutch planners have started to refer to the Randstad as Deltametropool. This actually consists of two large metropolitan areas:

=== Noordvleugel ===
The Noordvleugel ("North Wing"), with a population of around 3.6 million people, consists of the Haarlem and IJmuiden conurbations in the west, Amsterdam at the centre and Almere, the Gooi area and Utrecht in the east. The conurbation of Utrecht (population around one million) can be considered to be part of this wing, but can also be excluded. The cultural centre of the Noordvleugel, however, is notably centered on Amsterdam, which could as such be considered a classical centralistic metropolis. Amsterdam recently started to present itself as the Amsterdam metropolitan area (Metropoolregio Amsterdam). The expectation is that the use of the terms Noordvleugel and the Randstad will become less prevalent as a result.

While Utrecht is not the center of the Noordvleugel, it is in fact the center of the whole of the Netherlands itself. While being categorised as part of the Randstad, the Utrecht agglomeration lies relatively further apart, owing to its long history of rivalry with Holland and Amsterdam in particular. Utrecht is much more monocentric than Amsterdam, which has booming satellite cities such as Haarlem and Almere. While Utrecht functions as the gateway to the Randstad for both car and rail transport, it is disconnected from the virtually continuous urbanised zone in western Holland by the protected polder landscape of the Groene Hart. The North Wing of the Randstad is expected to grow more in population than the Zuidvleugel and the Groene Hart areas, with the growth of population also being in effect for a longer period of time, compared to the other two areas.

=== Zuidvleugel ===
The Zuidvleugel ("South Wing"), with a population of around 3.5 million people, stretches some 60 kilometers from Dordrecht in the southeast to Leiden in the north. The main conurbations are the Rotterdam and The Hague areas. The virtual centre of the Zuidvleugel lies in between these two major cities, near Delft. The first steps toward this development were taken with the construction of a new fast light-rail connection between Rotterdam and The Hague: RandstadRail. A long-delayed extension of the western A4 motorway from the south of Delft to Rotterdam has also been constructed, creating a second connection from Rotterdam, via The Hague, to Amsterdam.

A possible new area would be the Zuidoostflank; parallel to the A2 motorway (from Amsterdam to Eindhoven) and parallel to the A12 motorway (Utrecht to WERV (Wageningen, Ede, Rhenen and Veenendaal)), as this region has much potential to strengthen the knowledge economy of the Randstad.

Over the last few decades, a major topic in the Randstad is the conflict between the cities and the towns in between. These towns and the surrounding countryside, known as the Groene Hart (Green Heart), are usually much greener than the cities, they house many commuters that work in the cities and the former strongly depend on the latter for facilities such as hospitals and large scale entertainment. Cities need more space to expand, yet the towns fear losing their identity and autonomy.

=== Boundary issues ===
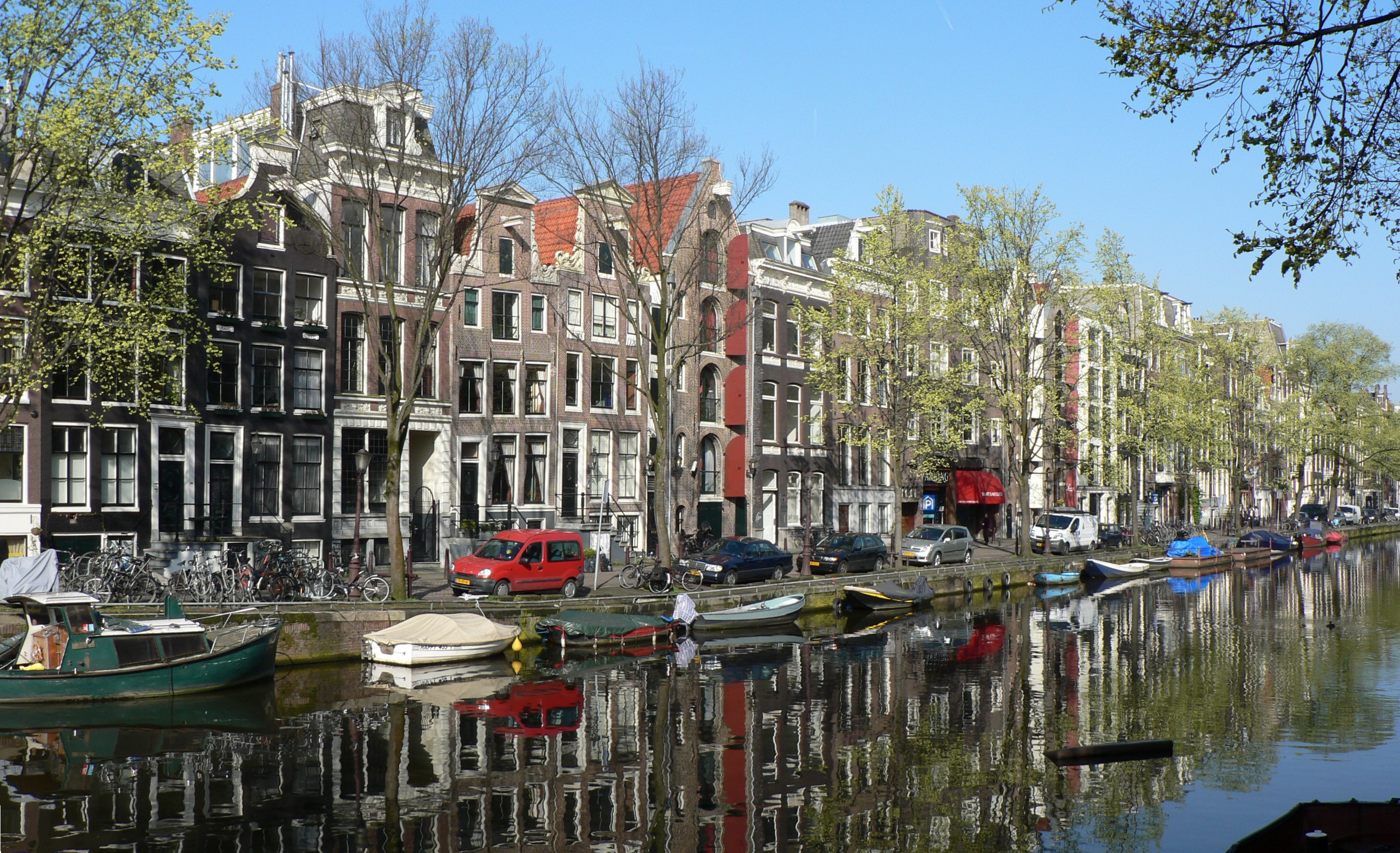
Amsterdam

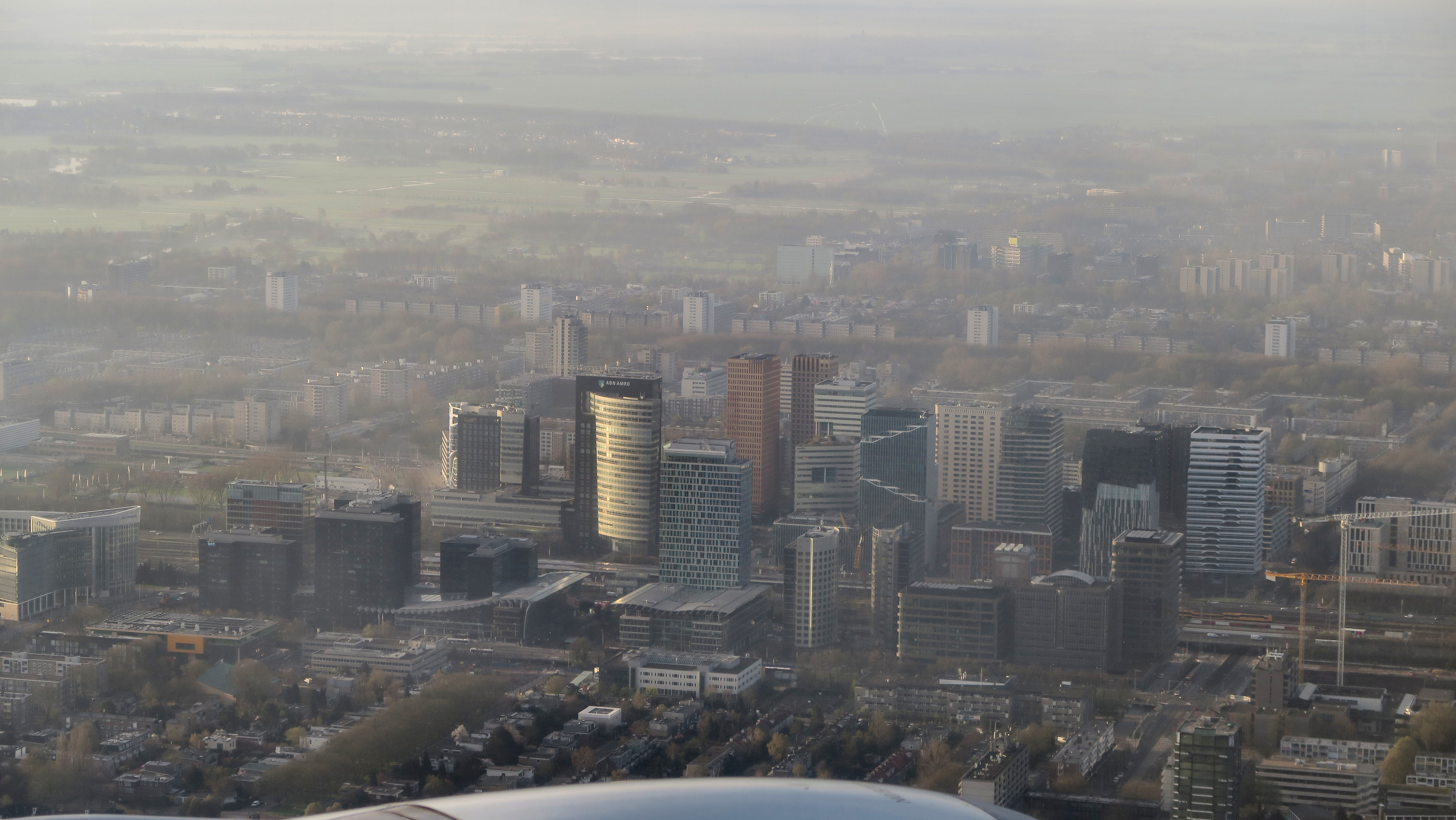
Zuidas

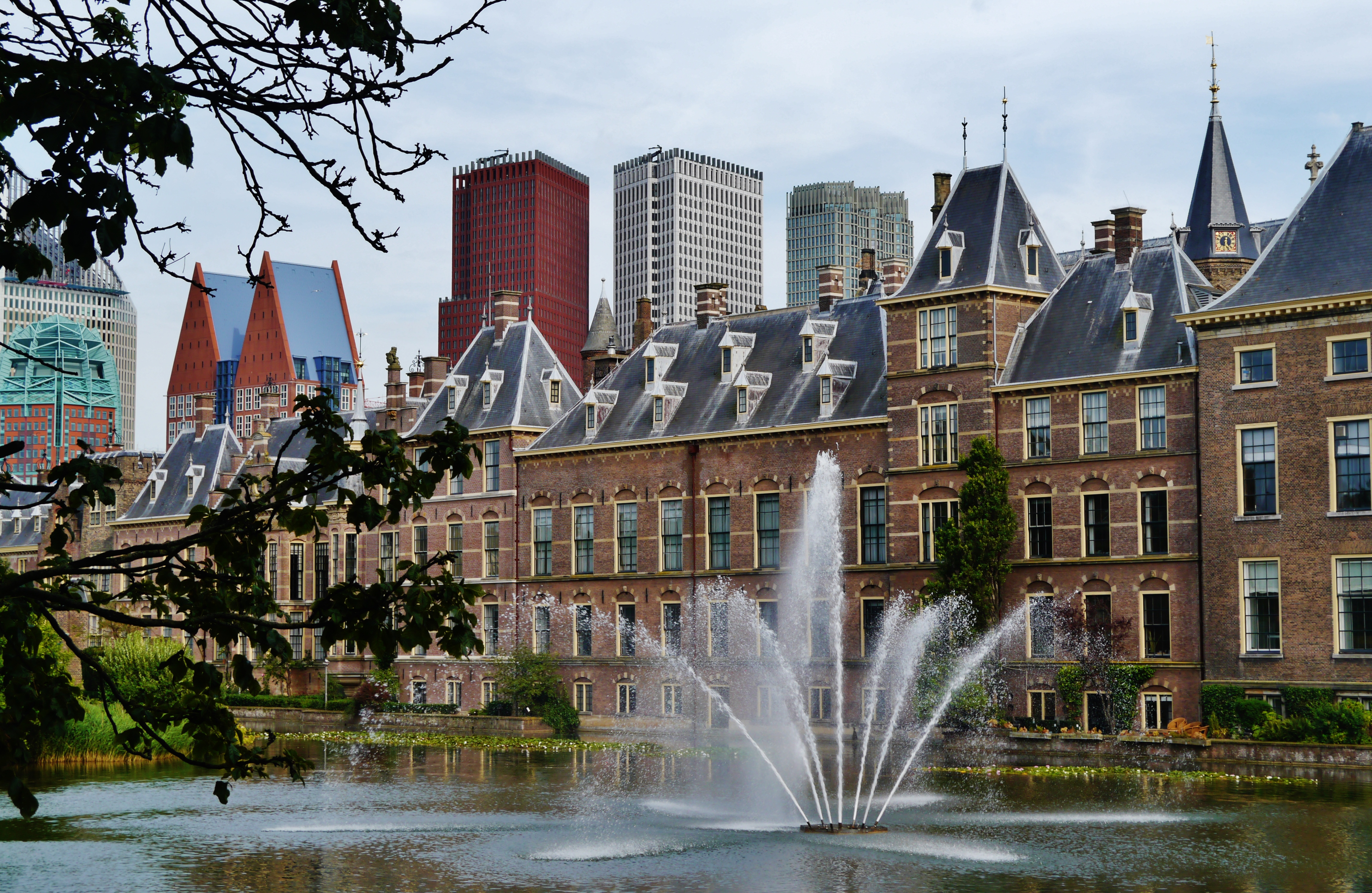
The Hague

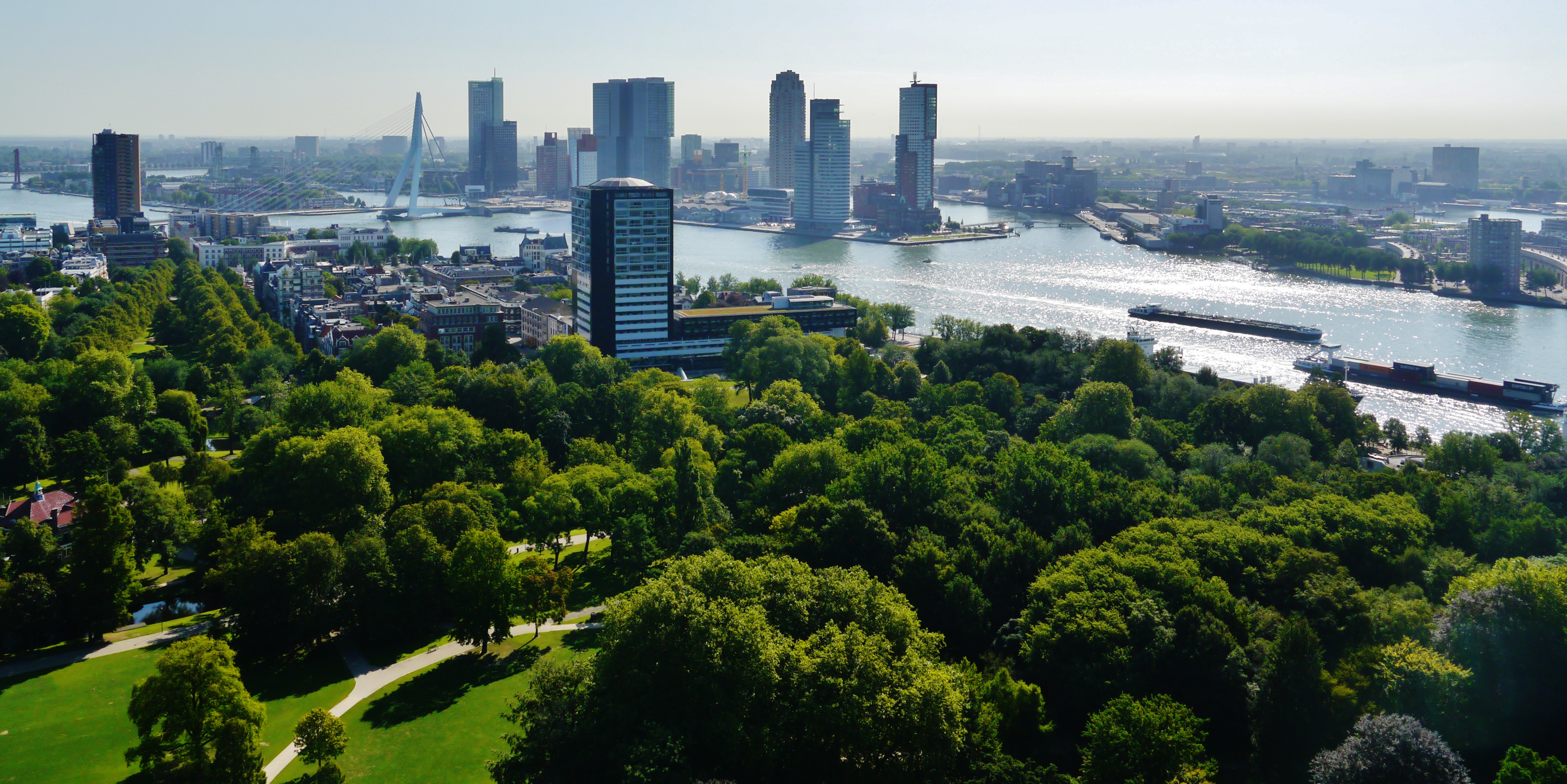
Rotterdam

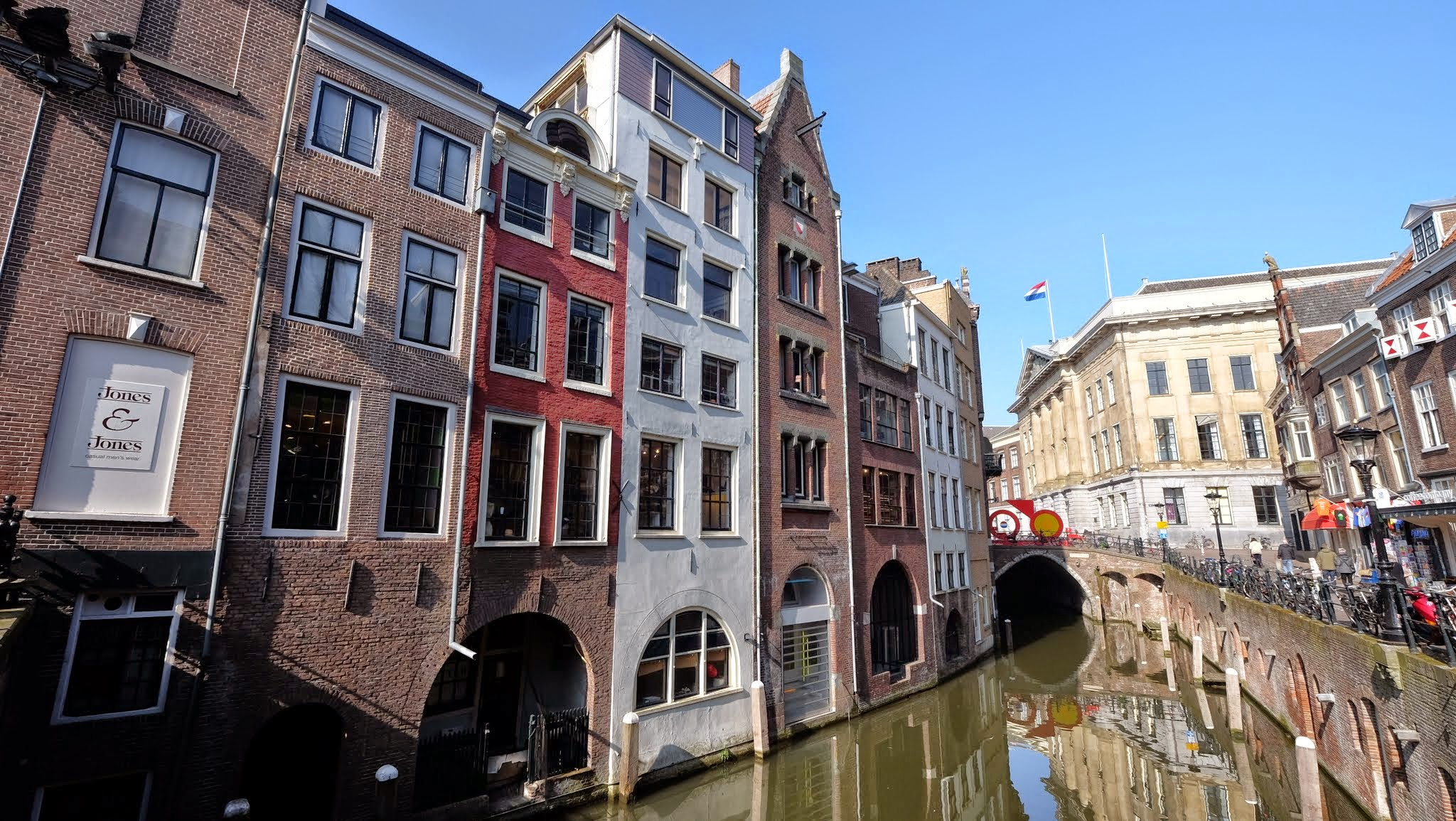
Utrecht

The Randstad's borders have never been officially specified. Some consider only the four most populous cities of the Netherlands (Amsterdam, Rotterdam, The Hague and Utrecht) part of it, others would say that areas such as Alkmaar (which represents itself as being part of it), Hoorn and Lelystad are also part of this conurbation.

The publication "Randstad 2040", released by the Government of the Netherlands, reveals that the Noordvleugel (Amsterdam and Utrecht region) is already growing parallel to the A1, A2, and A4 motorways, as well as into the northern part of North Holland (Alkmaar and Hoorn region) and Flevoland (Almere and Lelystad region). There is also a trend shown that the Noordvleugel is expanding parallel to the A2 (Amsterdam towards Eindhoven) and A12 (Utrecht towards the WERV region, encompassing the cities of Wageningen, Ede, Rhenen and Veenendaal) motorways. This region is called the Zuidoostflank (English: Southeastside).

== Economy ==
Randstad contributes around half of the Netherlands' total GDP.

	Area km^{2}	Population (2023)	GDP (Nominal, 2024)
North Holland	4,092	2,952,622	€243.327 billion
South Holland	3,308	3,804,906	€231.245 billion
Utrecht	1,560	1,387,643	€106.260 billion
Flevoland	2,412	444,701	€21.879 billion
Conurbation (Randstad)	11,372	8,589,872	€602.711 billion

== Culture ==
It is sometimes argued that a cultural divide exists between the Randstad and the rest of the country. This distinction is usually made in relation to Dutch politics and media, who according to critics are mostly interested in the affairs of the Randstad. Both branches (government and media) have their centre in the Randstad; respectively in The Hague and in Hilversum. The Randstad itself, however, does not represent a unified cultural zone. It is not a 'place' of residence or a carrier of cultural identity. According to the late influential urbanist Niek de Boer, the Randstad simply 'does not exist'. While the cities and landscapes in the Randstad share some commonalities, there are also large differences originating in centuries of divergent development. There are strong local identities within the region, especially in rural environments.

Politically the Randstad is often portrayed as a highly-educated progressive 'bubble', but reality is more nuanced here as well. The major urban centres of Amsterdam and Utrecht are indeed left-leaning, progressive strongholds, while Rotterdam and The Hague also include a notable presence of right-wing populist voters. As elsewhere in the Netherlands, other larger and mid-sized cities with substantial student populations, such as Leiden and Delft, also tend to lean left, whereas the suburban regions of the Randstad are generally more inclined towards right-leaning conservative parties.

The Randstad is home to some of the most reputable universities in Europe, including the University of Amsterdam, the VU Amsterdam, Leiden University, Erasmus University Rotterdam, Utrecht University and the Delft University of Technology.

== Transport ==
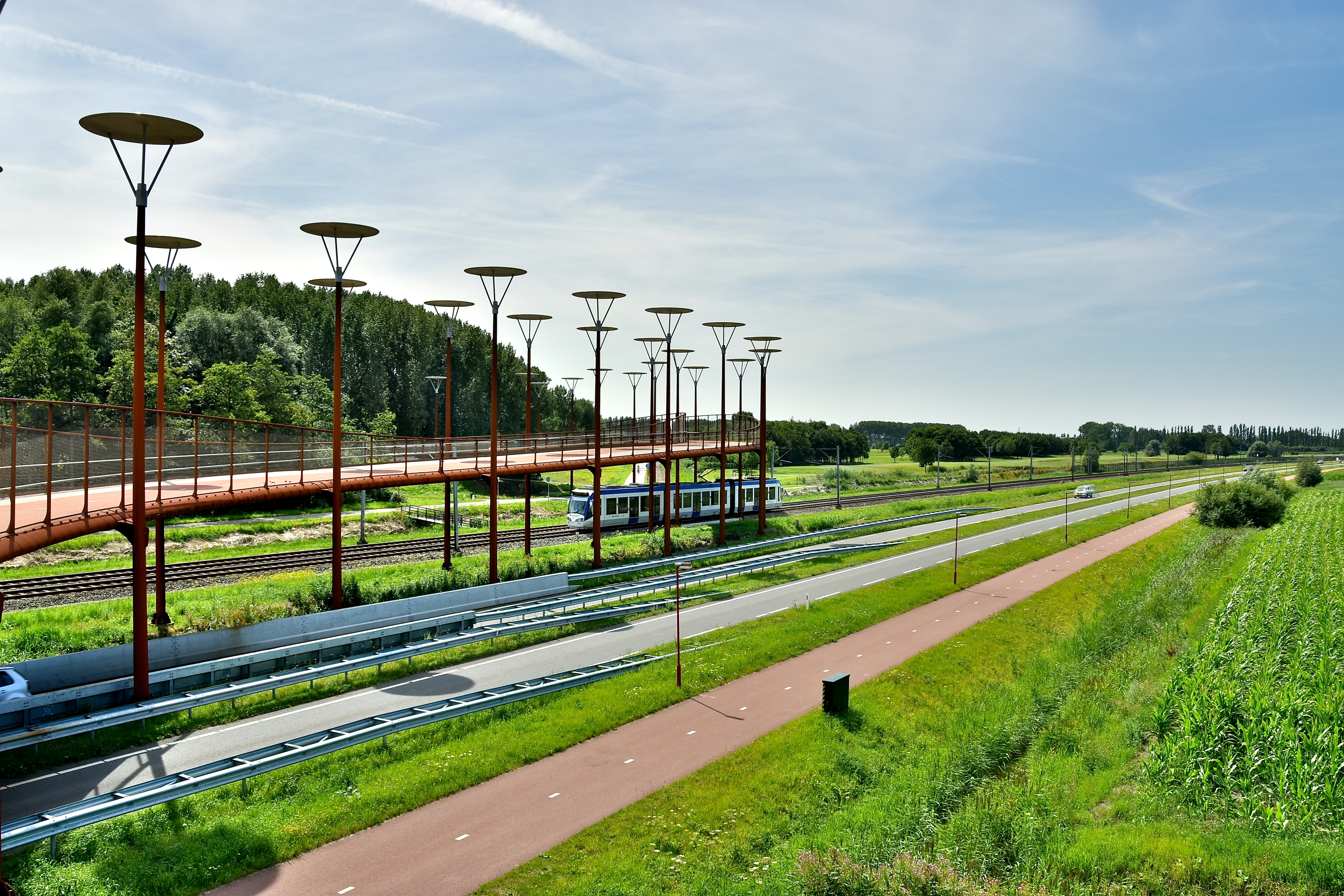
A RandstadRail LRV between Zoetermeer and The Hague

The Randstad possesses a large infrastructure system, with many railways, motorways, trams and subways in various cities. It is possible to cycle on reasonably safe and pleasant routes almost everywhere and cycling is a major mode of transport. The Port of Rotterdam, and Amsterdam Airport Schiphol, are both major international gateways. There are various smaller ports and airports in the Randstad, like the ports of IJmuiden, Amsterdam and Dordrecht, as well as Rotterdam The Hague Airport.

=== Motorways ===
The Randstad has various motorways, most of them starting around Amsterdam and Rotterdam. Many (inter)national corridors start in the Randstad, including the A1, A2, A4, A5, A6, A7, A8, A9, A10, A12, A13, A15, A16, A20, A27 and A28 autosnelwegen, as well as various commuter routes.

The Randstad network of motorways carry some of the highest traffic volumes in Europe. Until 2005 most motorways used to be no wider than four or six lanes, but from 2005 on capacity of most major highways expanded to six or eight and on some parts even ten lanes. A 14-lane highway is projected near Utrecht. Some hard shoulders are in use as peak hour lanes – traffic is allowed to use the hard shoulder as a third or fourth lane during periods of congestion, when traffic management signs indicate. Since these expansions traffic jams (which used to be quite intense) have been reduced by up to 25%. Traffic on the highway still is quite heavy however.

Because of the many obstructions in minor roads, such as one-way or circular routes (often created to make living neighbourhoods safer), a lot of local traffic also uses the motorways.

Another growing issue is the number of trucks on the radiating motorways from the Randstad; truck volumes can be as high as 20,000 trucks per day, occupying the entire right lane on some motorways.

=== Railways ===
The Randstad is the keystone of the Dutch railway network; most intercity connections terminate in one of the key cities in the Randstad. The railway network in the area is dense and heavily used. Together with the Swiss Federal Railways (1st), and the Belgian railways (3rd), the Dutch Railways are in the top 3 of Europe in punctuality. Larger cities in the Randstad have many railway stations, as well as light rail, subway and/or tram networks.

=== Cycling ===
Much effort is being expended in increasing the cycling rate of the Randstad. The campaign Fietsfilevrij exists to encourage cycling as an alternative to waiting in traffic jams on the motorway. "Bicycle highways" have been built on which cyclists have priority for long distance, high speed cycle commuting. For instance, one of these stretches the 50 km distance between Amsterdam and Utrecht.

== See also ==
- List of metropolitan areas in the European Union by GDP
- Blue Banana
- BrabantStad
- Global city
- Urban agglomeration

== Notes ==
1. Randstad is not an official statistical area. The 'land area' figure is the sum of the areas of the 4 member provinces. The Randstad is normally not considered to cover the whole of any of these provinces.
2. Estimates range from a conservative 7.1 million (agglomerations on the rim of the Groene Hart) to 8.4 million (full population of the 4 member provinces).
