= The Hague =

City and municipality in the Netherlands

The Hague Den Haag 's-Gravenhage
- City and municipality
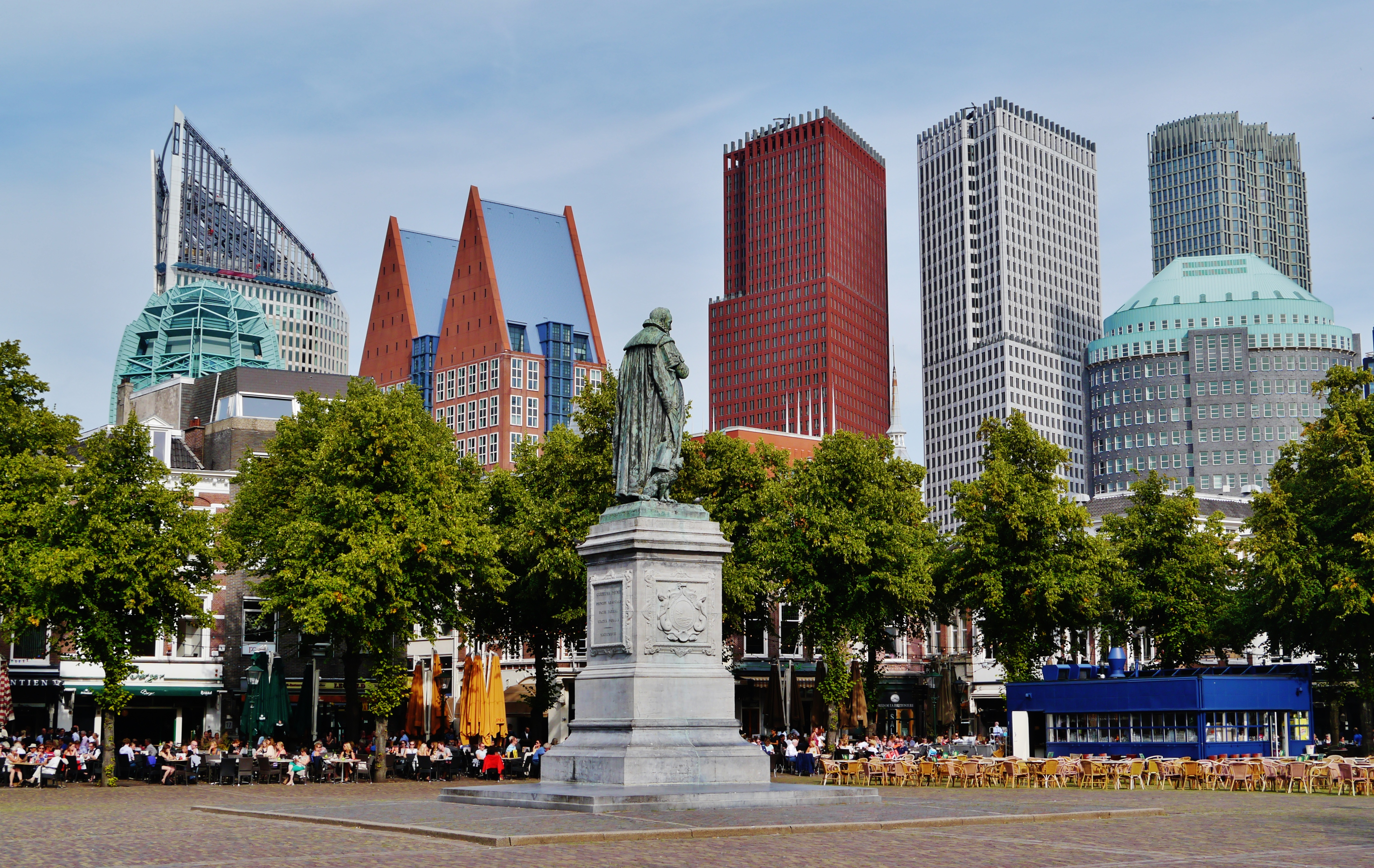
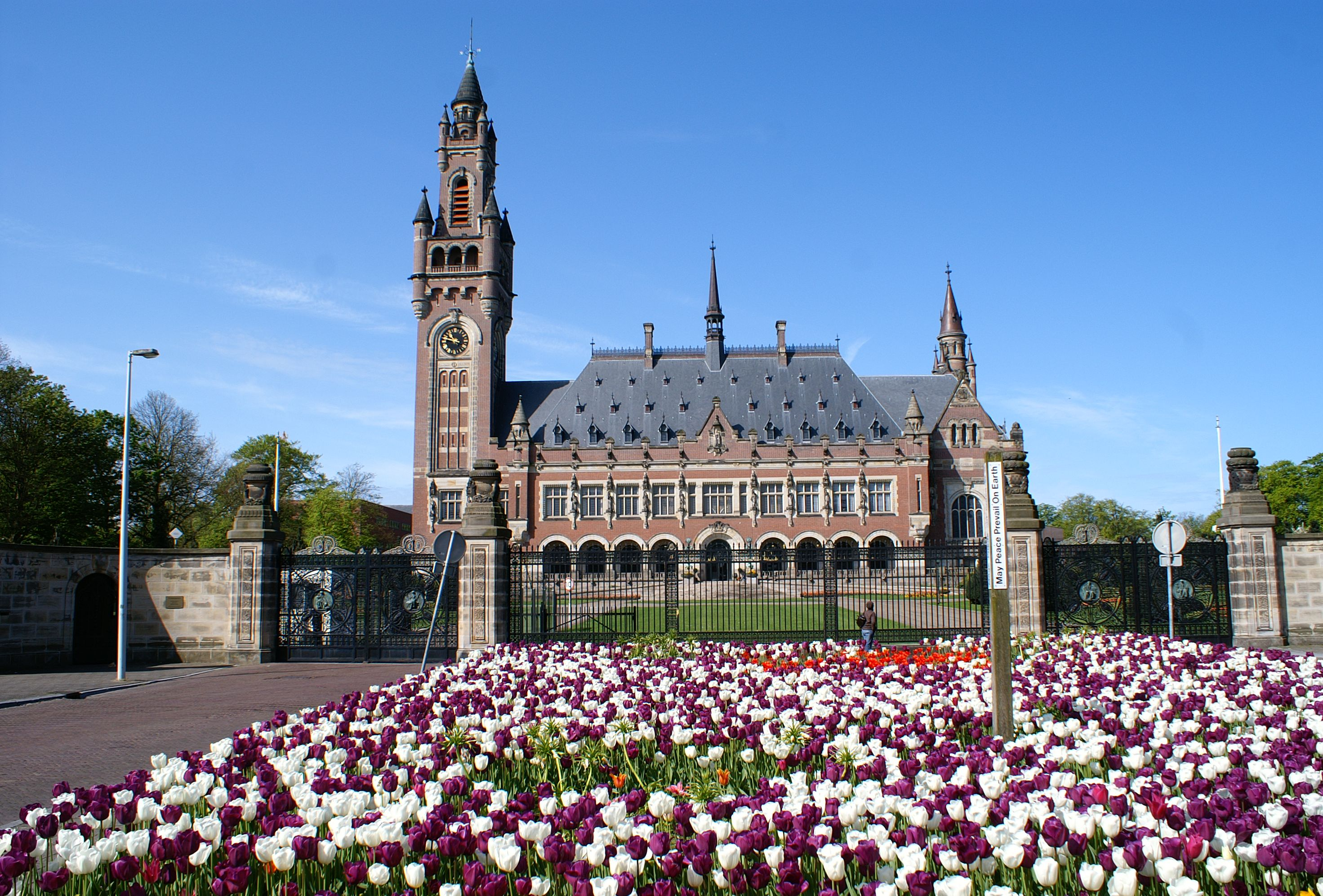
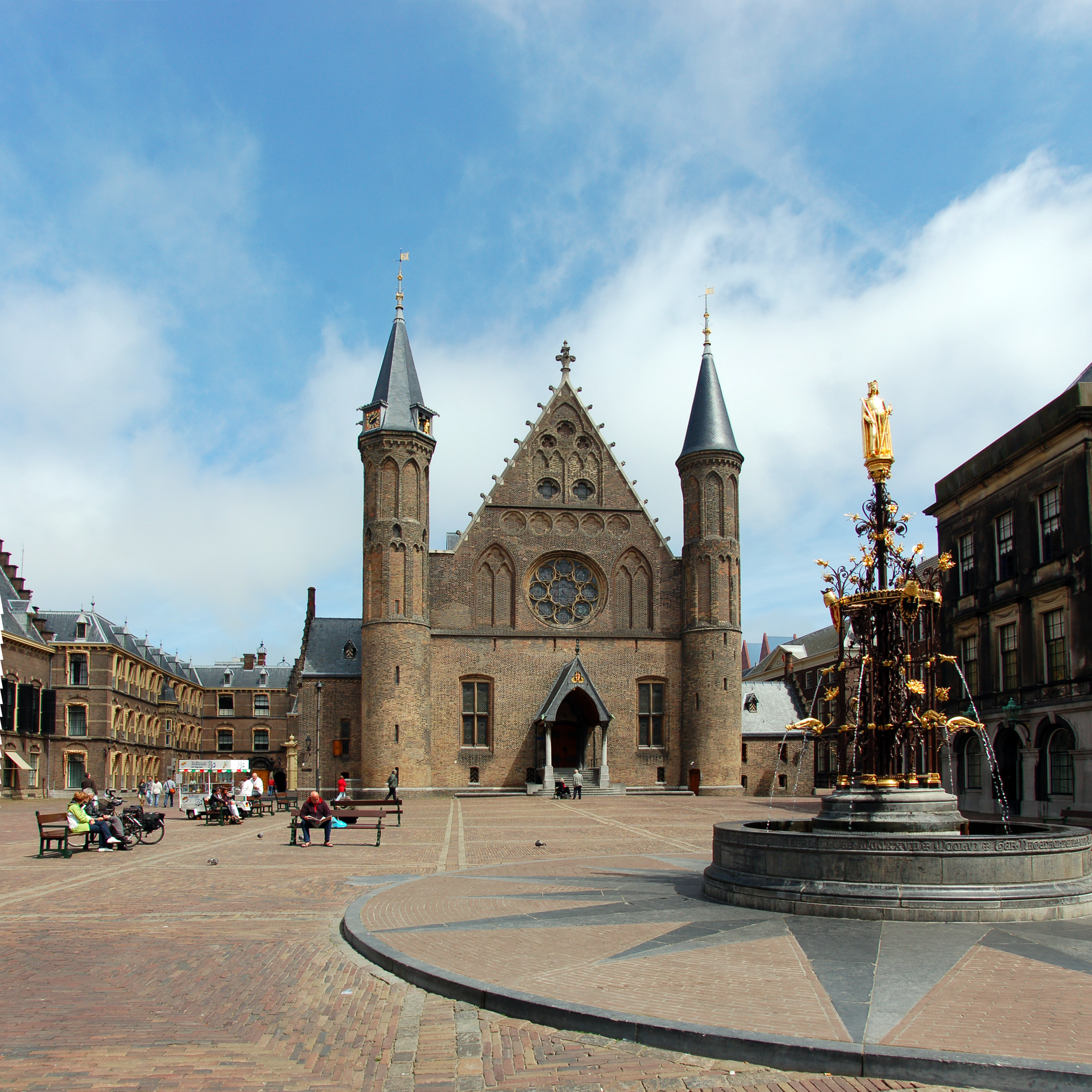
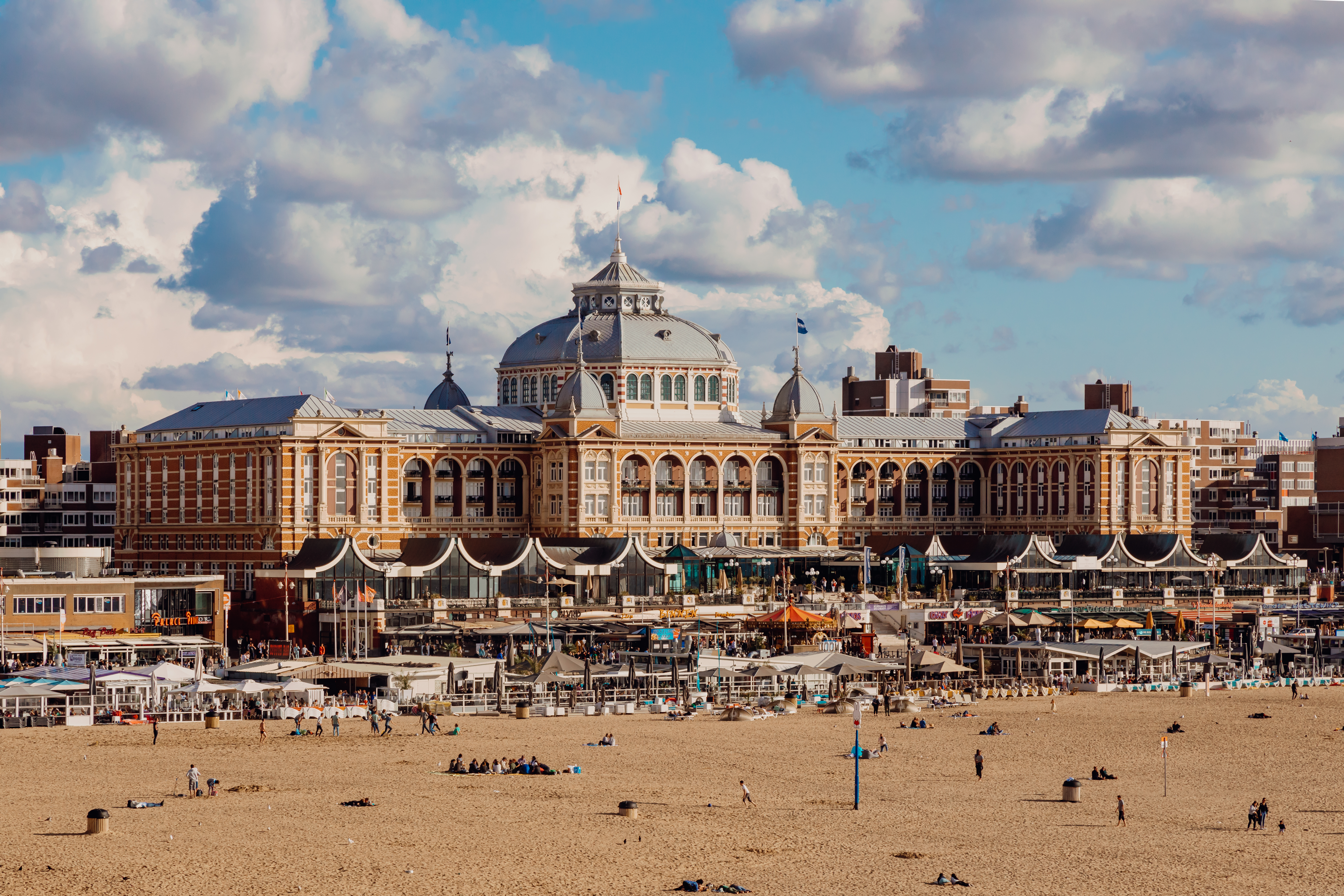
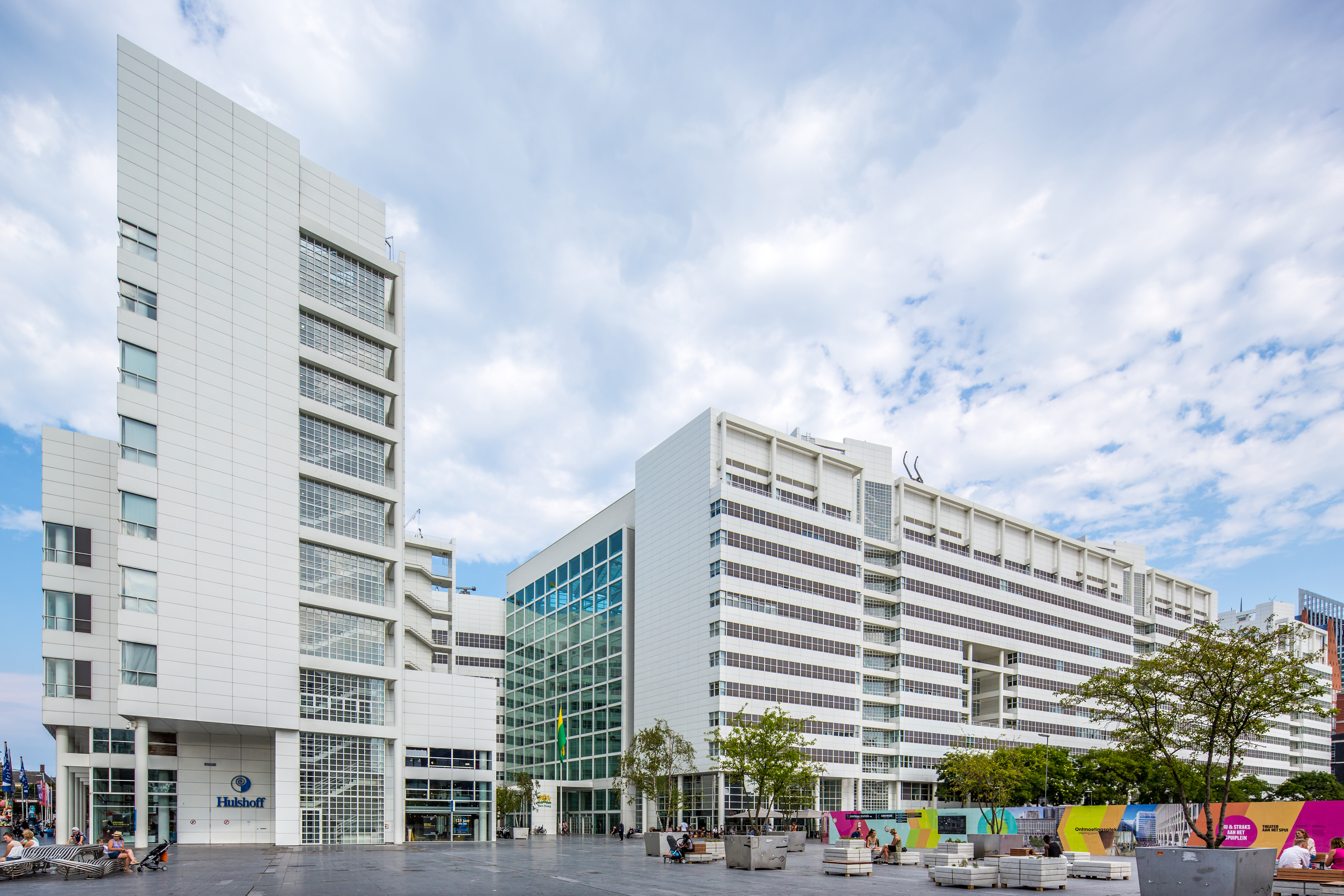
- Plein Peace Palace Binnenhof Kurhaus City Hall

- Flag Coat of arms
- Nicknames: De Hofstad, De Residentie, Agga, 070
- Motto(s): Vrede en Recht ('Peace and Justice')
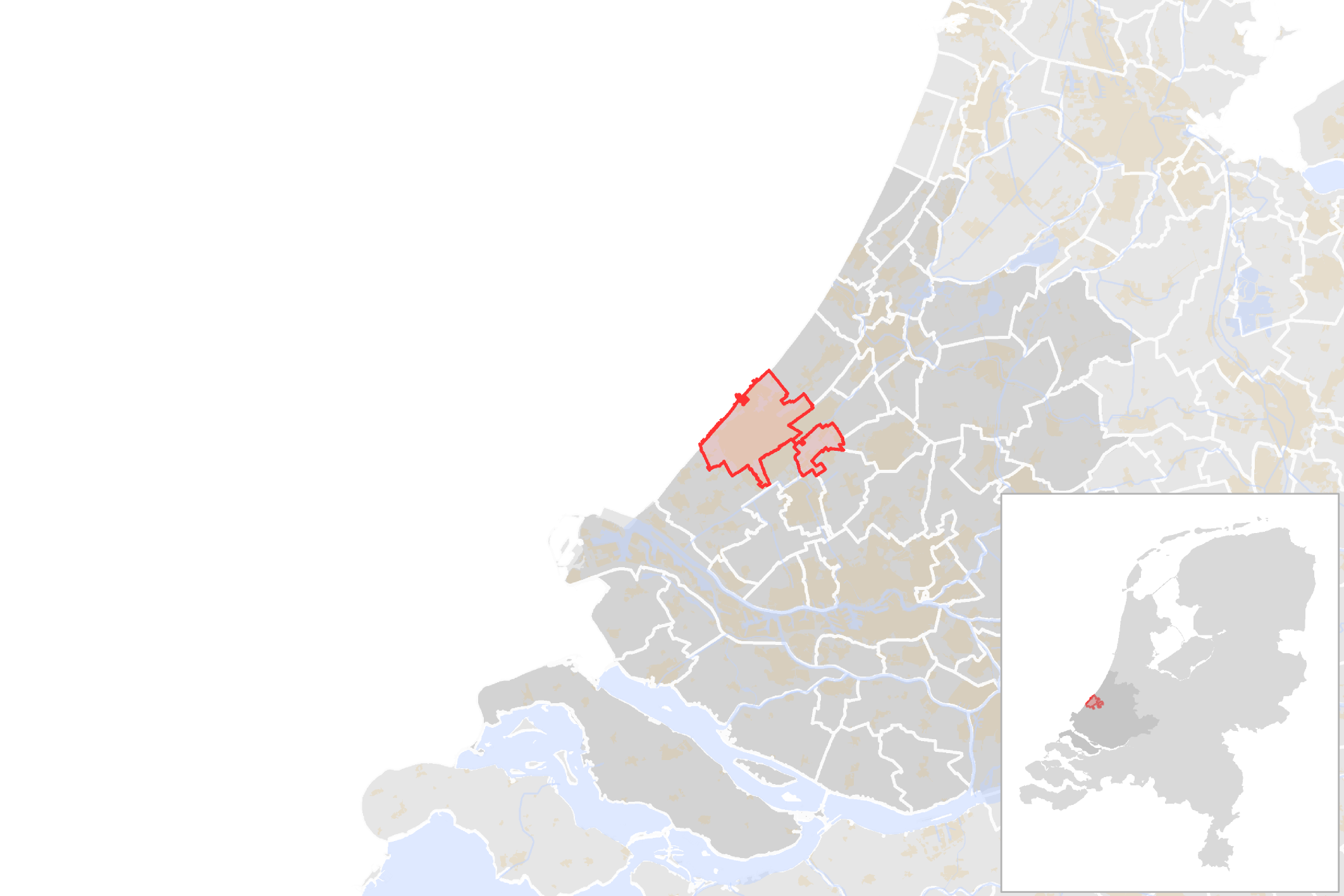
- Location within South Holland
- Interactive map of The Hague
- Location within the Netherlands Location within Europe
- Coordinates: 52°04′48″N 04°18′36″E
- Country: Netherlands
- Province: South Holland
- Subregion: Haaglanden
- District: 8 districts: Centrum; Escamp; Haagse Hout; Laak; Leidschenveen-Ypenburg; Loosduinen; Scheveningen; Segbroek

Government
  - Body: Municipal council
  - Mayor: Jan van Zanen (VVD)
  - Aldermen: List: Kavita Parbhudayal (VVD); Saskia Bruines (D66); Liesbeth van Tongeren (GL); Hilbert Bredemeijer (CDA); Martijn Balster (PvdA); Anne Mulder (VVD); Robert van Asten (D66); Bert van Alphen (GL)

Area
  - Municipality: 98.13 km^{2} (37.89 sq mi)
  - Land: 82.45 km^{2} (31.83 sq mi)
  - Water: 15.68 km^{2} (6.05 sq mi)
  - Urban: 286.31 km^{2} (110.54 sq mi)
  - Metro: 1,256.40 km^{2} (485.10 sq mi)
  - Randstad: 4,384.10 km^{2} (1,692.71 sq mi)
- Elevation: 1 m (3.3 ft)

Population (1 January 2021)
  - Municipality: 549,163
  - Rank: 3rd
  - Density: 6,907/km^{2} (17,890/sq mi)
  - Urban: 883,720
  - Metro: 2,390,101 (Note: Counted as one with the city of Rotterdam, its seaport and industrial area, and its suburbs / metro area.)
  - Randstad: 6,396,416
- Demonym: Hagenaar or Hagenees

GDP
  - Randstad: €602.711 billion (2024)
- Time zone: UTC+01:00 (CET)
  - Summer (DST): UTC+02:00 (CEST)
- Postcodes: 2490–2599
- Area code: 070, 015
- Website: www.denhaag.nl (in Dutch)

The Hague (Note: English pronunciation: /heɪɡ/ HAYG.) (Dutch: Den Haag, (Note: Dutch pronunciation: [dɛn ˈɦaːx].) short for 's-Gravenhage (Note: Dutch pronunciation: [ˌsxraːvə(n)ˈɦaːɣə].)) is the capital city of the South Holland province of the Netherlands. With a population of over half a million, it is the third-largest city in the Netherlands. Situated on the west coast facing the North Sea, The Hague is the country's administrative centre and its seat of government, and has been described as the country's de facto capital since the time of the Dutch Republic, while Amsterdam is the official capital of the Netherlands.

The Hague is the core municipality of the Greater The Hague urban area containing over 800,000 residents, and is also part of the Rotterdam–The Hague metropolitan area, which, with a population of approximately 2.6 million, is the largest metropolitan area of the Netherlands. The city is also part of the Randstad region, one of the largest conurbations in Europe.

The Hague is the seat of the Cabinet, the States General, the Supreme Court, and the Council of State of the Netherlands. King Willem-Alexander officially lives in the Huis ten Bosch and works at the Noordeinde Palace together with Queen Máxima. Most foreign embassies in the Netherlands are in the city. The Hague is also home to the headquarters of many Dutch companies, with Shell plc having major offices in the city as well. The Royal Library of the Netherlands is also located there. The Hague's coastal area includes the popular seaside resort Scheveningen.

The Hague is known as the global hub of international law and arbitration. The International Court of Justice, the main judicial arm of the United Nations, is based in the city, as are the International Criminal Court, the Permanent Court of Arbitration, the Organisation for the Prohibition of Chemical Weapons, Europol, and approximately 200 other international governmental organizations. The name "The Hague" is commonly used metonymically to refer to either of the international courts that reside in the city. The city has hosted several major international conferences, including the 2014 Nuclear Security Summit and the 2025 NATO Summit.

== Etymology ==
The name Den Haag (anglicised as The Hague and gallicised as La Haye) derives from the Middle Dutch word hag(h)e, meaning "hedge", "enclosure", or "hunting ground". It first appeared in 1242. The fuller form 's-Gravenhage, meaning "the count's enclosure", first appeared in 1347. (Note: 's is an abbreviated form of the genitive article des, while den is a fossilised dative article (see archaic Dutch declension). The name is grammatically masculine even though the word haag is normally feminine.) The count in question was the Count of Holland (as is the case with nearby 's-Gravenzande).

In deference to common usage, the municipal government adopted the shorter name in 1990, reserving the long-form name for official documents. The post office specifies that letters should be addressed to 's-Gravenhage, but a letter to Den Haag will be delivered just as well. The railway stations use the name Den Haag, as do signposts.

== History ==
=== Ancient history ===
The area was part of the Roman province of Germania Inferior and was close to the border of the empire, the Upper Germanic-Rhaetian Limes. In 1997, four Roman milestones were discovered at Wateringse Veld. The originals are in the "Museon" museum. The milestones indicate the distance from the nearest Roman city, Forum Hadriani (modern Voorburg), and can be dated to the reign of the emperors Antoninus Pius (138–161; the column is dated 151), Caracalla (211–217), Gordian III (238–244), and Decius (249–251).

=== Early history ===
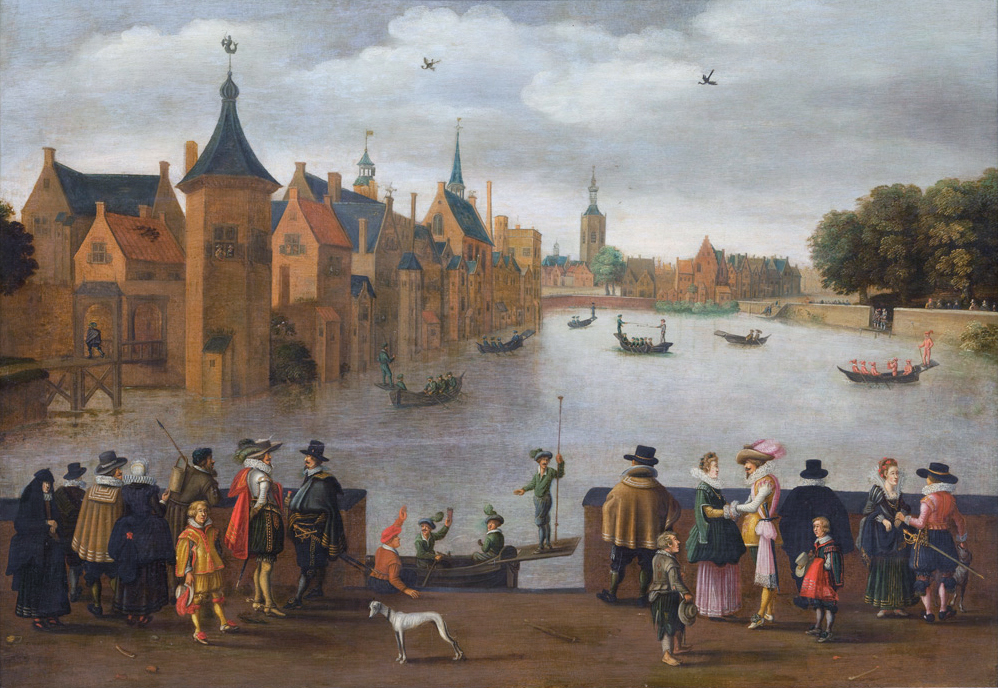
The Binnenhof at the Hofvijver, 1625

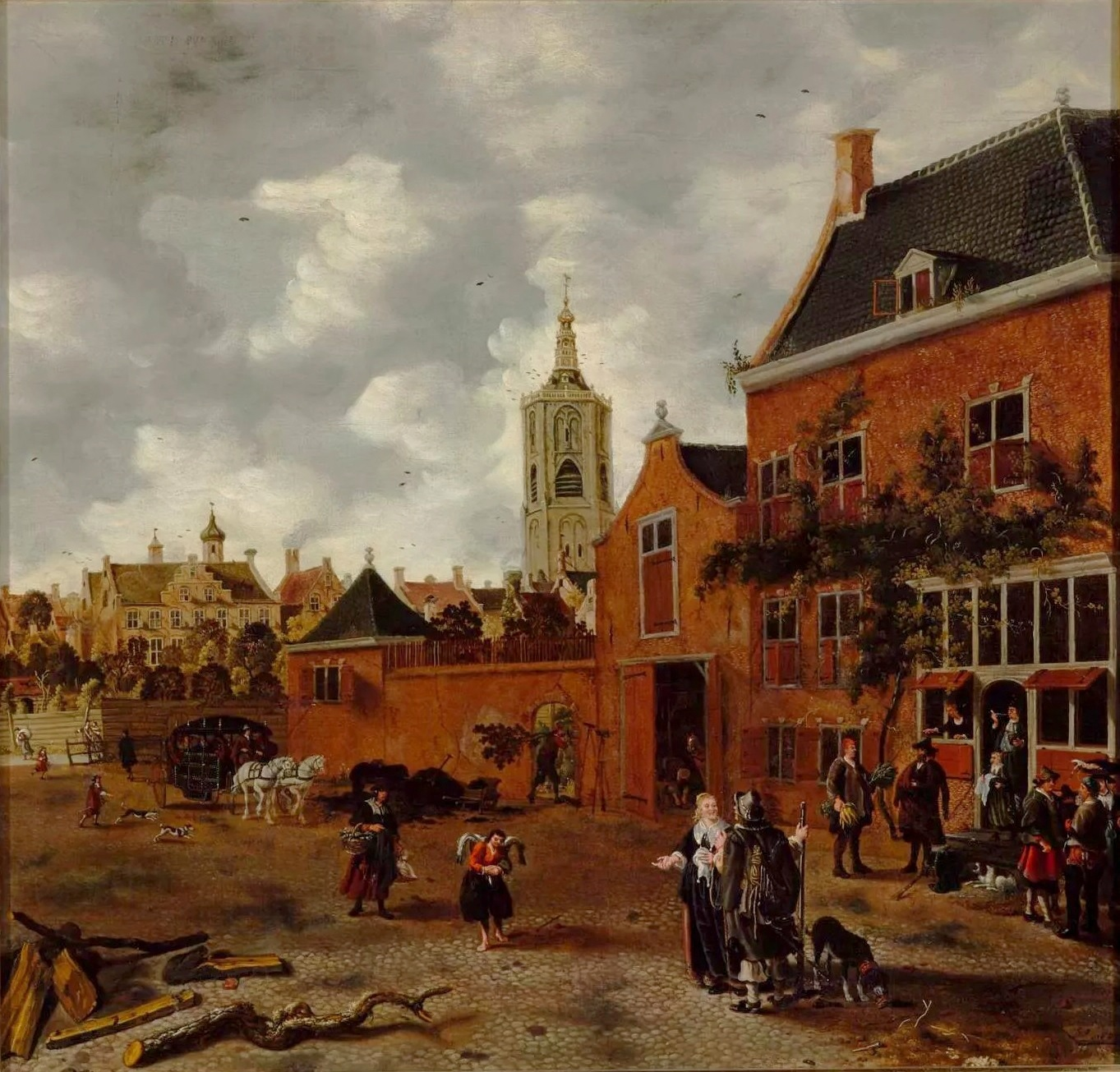
Street in The Hague by Sybrand van Beest, c. 1650, Royal Castle in Warsaw

Little is known about the origin of The Hague. There are no contemporary documents describing it, and later sources are often of dubious reliability. What is certain is that The Hague was founded by the last counts of the House of Holland. Floris IV already owned two residences in the area, but presumably purchased a third court situated by the present-day Hofvijver in 1229, previously owned by a woman called Meilendis. Presumably, Floris IV intended to rebuild the court into a large castle, but he died in a tournament in 1234, before anything was built. His son and successor William II lived in the court, and after he was elected King of the Romans in 1248, he promptly returned to The Hague, and had builders turn the court into a "royal palace" (regale palacium), which would later be called the Binnenhof ("Inner Court"). He died in 1256 before this palace was completed, but parts of it were finished during the reign of his son Floris V, of which the Ridderzaal ("Knights' Hall"), still intact, is the most prominent. It is still used for political events, such as the annual speech from the throne by the Dutch monarch. From the 13th century onward, the counts of Holland used The Hague as their administrative centre and residence when in Holland.

The village that originated around the Binnenhof was first mentioned as Die Haghe in a charter dating from 1242. It became the primary residence of the Counts of Holland in 1358 and thus became the seat of many government institutions. This status allowed the village to grow; by the Late Middle Ages, it had grown to the size of a city, although it did not receive city rights. In its early years, the village was in the ambacht, or rural district, of Monster, which was governed by the Lord of Monster. Seeking to exercise more direct control over the village, however, the Count split the village off and created a separate ambacht called Haagambacht, governed directly by the Counts of Holland. The territory of Haagambacht was considerably expanded during the reign of Floris V.

When the House of Burgundy inherited the counties of Holland and Zeeland in 1432, they appointed a stadtholder to rule in their stead with the States of Holland and West Friesland as an advisory council. Although their seat was in The Hague, the city became subordinate to more important centres of government such as Brussels and Mechelen, from where the sovereigns ruled over the increasingly centralised Burgundian Netherlands.

At the beginning of the Eighty Years' War, the absence of city walls proved disastrous, as it allowed Spanish troops to occupy the town easily. In 1575, the States of Holland, temporarily based in Delft, even considered demolishing the city, but this proposal was abandoned after mediation by William the Silent. In 1588, The Hague became the permanent seat of the States of Holland as well as the States General of the Dutch Republic. For the administration to maintain control over city matters, The Hague never received official city status. However, it did have many of the privileges normally granted only to cities. In modern administrative law, "city rights" have no place anymore.

=== Modern history ===
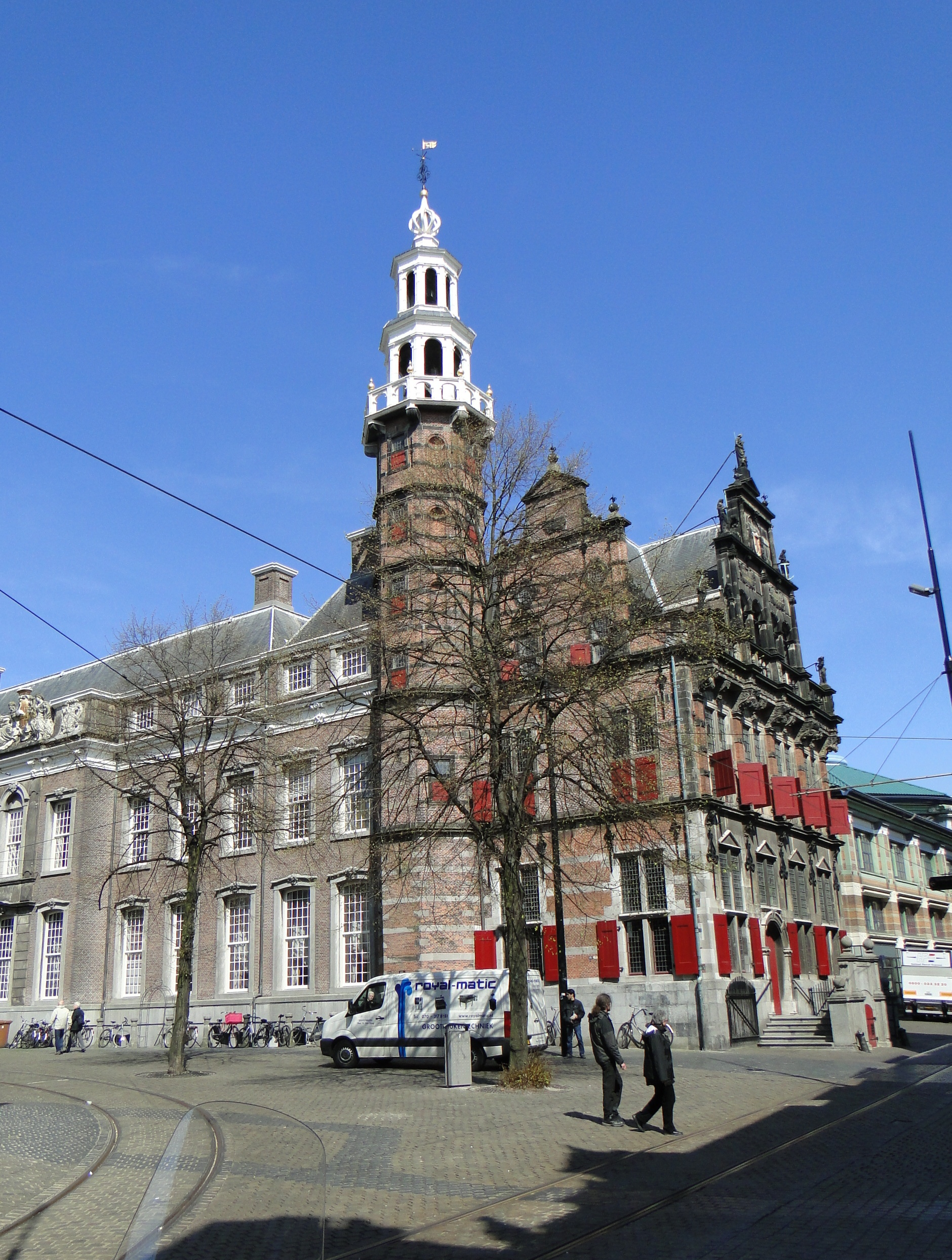
The Old City Hall (The Hague) on the Groenmarkt, seen from the Nieuwstraat. It was built in 1564, replacing the count's castle.

In 1806, when the Kingdom of Holland was a puppet state of the First French Empire, the settlement was granted city rights by Louis Bonaparte. After the Napoleonic Wars, modern-day Belgium and the Netherlands were combined in the United Kingdom of the Netherlands to form a buffer against France. As a compromise, Brussels and Amsterdam alternated as capital every two years, with the government remaining in The Hague. After the separation of Belgium in 1830, Amsterdam remained the capital of the Netherlands, while the government was situated in The Hague. When the government started to play a more prominent role in Dutch society after 1850, The Hague quickly expanded. Many streets were specifically built for the large number of civil servants employed in the country's government and for the Dutchmen who were retiring from the administration of the Netherlands East Indies. The growing city amalgamated the rural municipality of Loosduinen partly in 1903 and completely in 1923.

The city sustained heavy damage during World War II. Many Jews were killed during the German occupation. Additionally, the Atlantic Wall was built through the city, causing a large quarter to be torn down by the Nazi occupiers. On 3 March 1945, the Royal Air Force mistakenly bombed the Bezuidenhout quarter. The target was an installation of V-2 rockets in the nearby Haagse Bos park, but because of navigational errors, the bombs fell on a heavily populated and historic part of the city. The bombardment wreaked widespread destruction in the area and caused 511 fatalities.

Because of uncertainty about what to do after the destruction caused by the bombing, nobody attempted to plan a reconstruction of Bezuidenhout. In 1962, David Jokinen saw an opportunity to put an end to the situation where two main stations each served only part of the rail traffic. The Jokinen Plan included the intent to demolish the Staatsspoor Station, with Hollands Spoor becoming the central station. Jokinen's plan sparked fierce discussions. The plan was not implemented, in part because it was only presented when decision-making had finally reached an advanced stage. In the place of the Staatsspoor station now stands the Den Haag Centraal railway station.

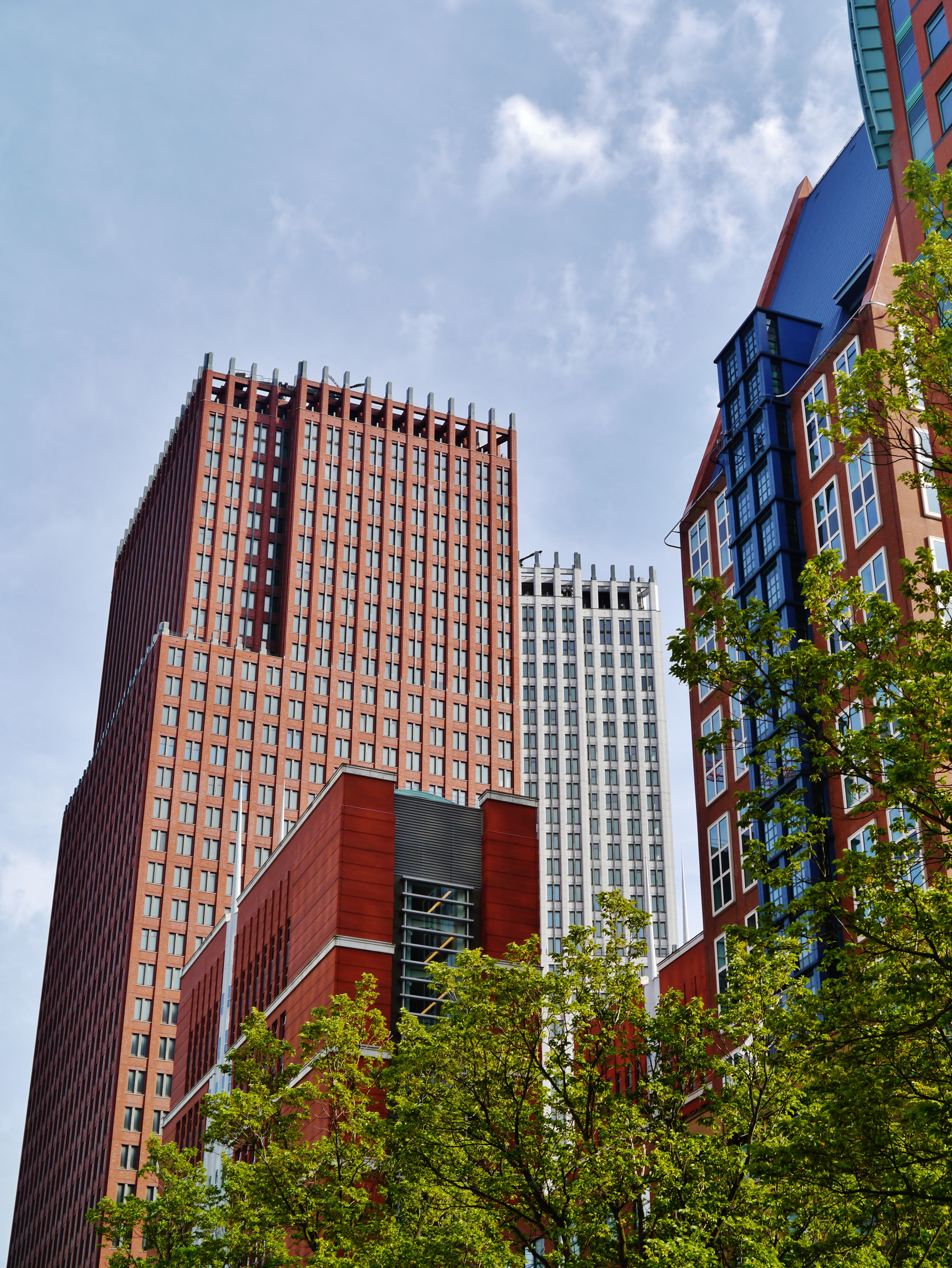
The Ministry of Justice and Security building, opened in 2012

After the war, The Hague became at one time the largest building site in Europe. The city expanded massively southwest, and the destroyed areas were quickly rebuilt. The population peaked at 600,000 inhabitants around 1965. In the 1970s and 1980s, mostly white middle-class families moved to neighbouring towns such as Voorburg, Leidschendam, Rijswijk and (most of all) Zoetermeer. This led to the traditional pattern of an impoverished inner city and more prosperous suburbs. Attempts to include parts of these municipalities in the city of The Hague were highly controversial. In the 1990s, with the consent of the Dutch Parliament, The Hague annexed large areas from neighboring and non-adjacent towns to build new residential areas, which are still being developed today.

== Geography ==
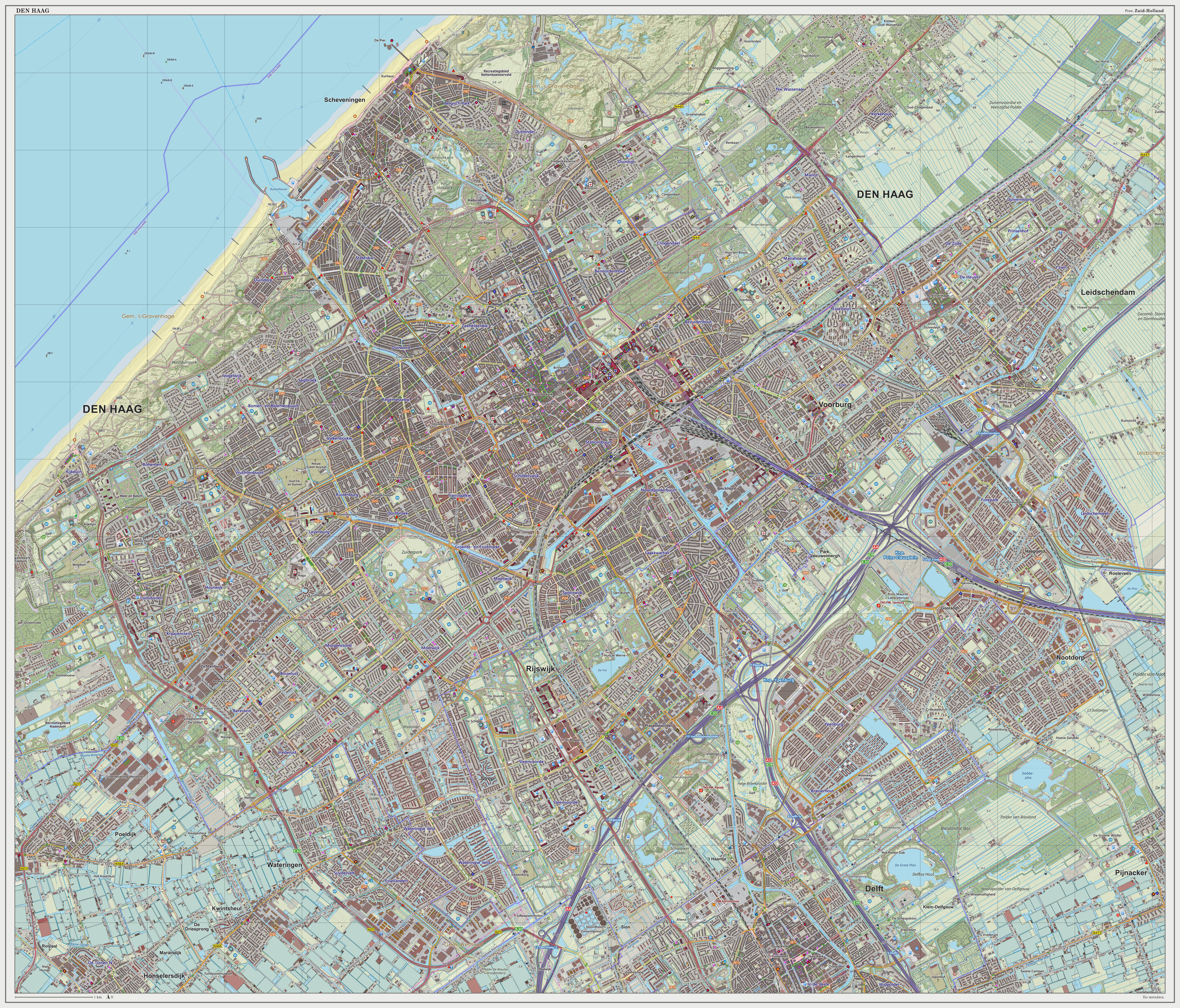
Detailed topographic map of The Hague, 2014

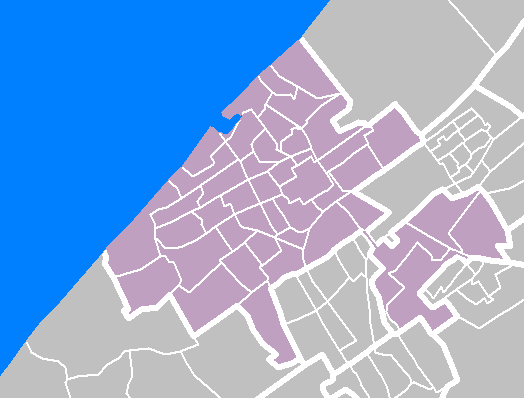
The Hague, divided into neighbourhoods

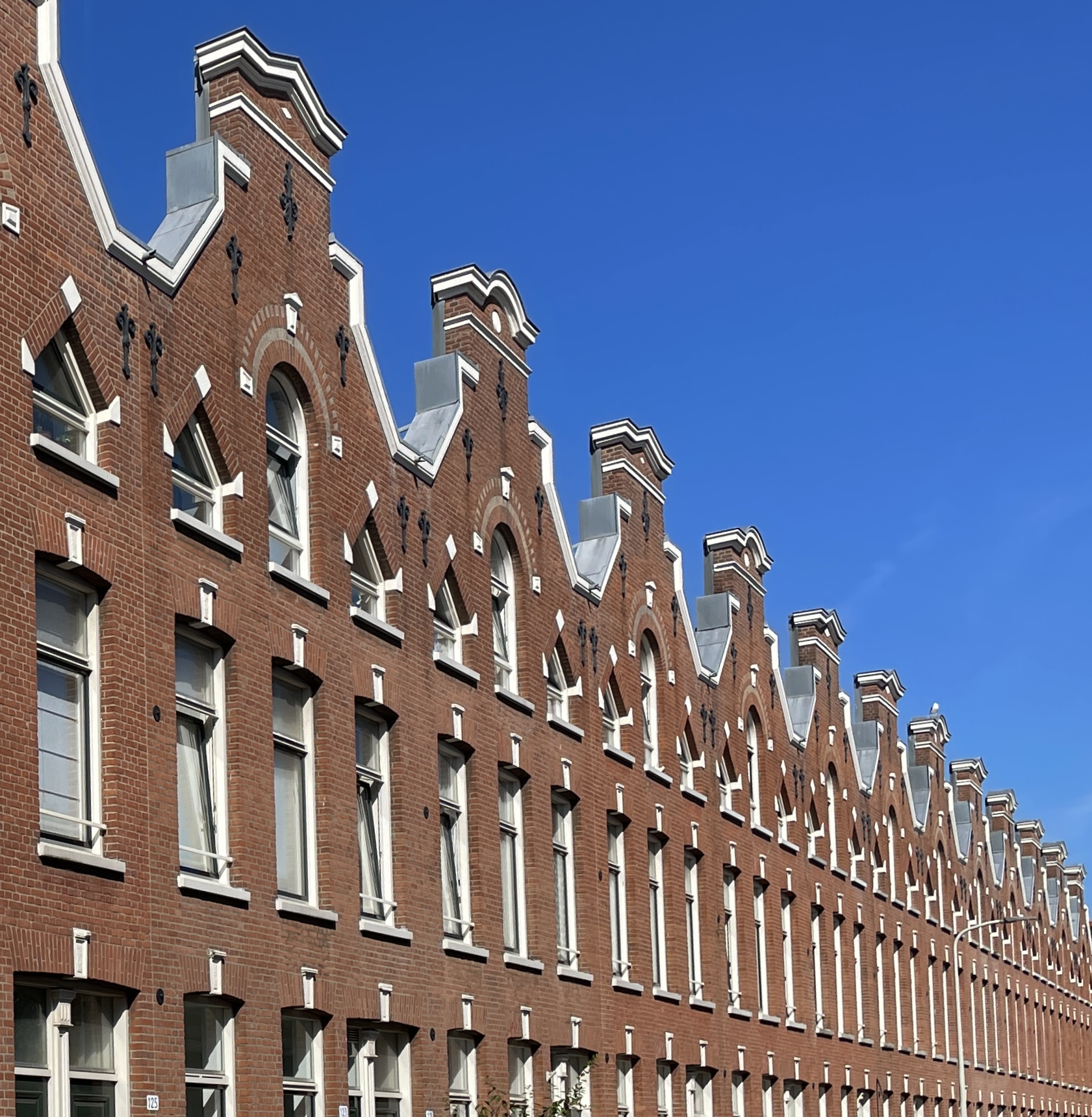
Rembrandt Street

The Hague is the largest Dutch city on the North Sea in the Netherlands and forms the centre of the Greater The Hague urban area. Westland and Wateringen lie to the south, Rijswijk, Delft and the Rotterdam conurbation (known as Rijnmond) to the southeast, Pijnacker-Nootdorp and Zoetermeer to the east, Leidschendam-Voorburg, Voorschoten and the Leiden conurbation to the northeast and Wassenaar to the north.

The conurbations around The Hague and Rotterdam are close enough to be seen as a single conurbation in some contexts. For example, they share the Rotterdam The Hague Airport and a light rail system called RandstadRail. This led to the creation of the Rotterdam-The Hague metropolitan area. This large conurbation centred on The Hague and Rotterdam is, in turn, part of the Randstad—specifically a band of municipalities called the South Wing (Zuidvleugel). The Randstad, which also includes, among others, Amsterdam and Utrecht, has a population of 6,659,300. The Hague lies at the southwestern corner of the second-largest conurbation in the European Union.

The Hague is divided into eight official districts, which are, in turn, divided into neighbourhoods. Some of the most prosperous and some of the poorest neighbourhoods of the Netherlands can be found in The Hague. The wealthier areas such as Statenkwartier, Belgisch Park, Marlot, Benoordenhout and Archipelbuurt are generally in the northwestern part of the city, closer to the sea, whereas the southeastern neighbourhoods such as Transvaal, Moerwijk, and the Schilderswijk are significantly poorer, except the Vinex-locations of Leidschenveen-Ypenburg and Wateringse Veld. This division is reflected in the local accent: The more affluent citizens are usually called "Hagenaars" and speak the so-called bekakt Haags ("posh"); this contrasts with the Hagenezen, who speak plat Haags ("vulgar"); see Demographics below.

The districts are:

- Centrum (110,000 inhabitants) forms the heart of The Hague. The Binnenhof, the Noordeinde Palace, the Mauritshuis museum, the Nieuwe Kerk, the Grote Kerk, the Old City Hall and the City Hall are located here. Architecture varies from medieval to the 20th century.
- Escamp (131,000 inhabitants) is the most populous district of The Hague, built largely after World War II as part of The Hague's large expansion to the southeast. One railway station can be found here: Den Haag Moerwijk. The district is divided into six neighbourhoods.
- Haagse Hout (51,000 inhabitants) is a wealthy district in the northeast of the city and the location of the Haagse Bos, a large forest. The King of the Netherlands lives in the royal palace Huis ten Bosch in this forest. The district also includes the financial centre of the city, the Beatrixkwartier.
- Laak (46,000 inhabitants) is the smallest district of the city, southeast of its centre, for the most part built in the 20th and 21st centuries. The area used to be part of Rijswijk until the municipality of The Hague bought the land in 1844. The Hollands Spoor railway station and The Hague University are located here, as well as the site of the planned mixed-use development Nieuw Binckhorst.
- Leidschenveen-Ypenburg (48,000 inhabitants) is an early 21st-century Vinex-location southeast of the city, geographically connected to the main body of the city only by a narrow corridor. The district is divided into Leidschenveen and Ypenburg, which were part of Leidschendam, Nootdorp, and Rijswijk before the areas were annexed by The Hague in 2002. This area was the site of Ypenburg Airport, which was a military airport during World War II.
- Loosduinen (53,000 inhabitants) is the westernmost district of The Hague. It was a village unto itself until 1923, when it was annexed by The Hague. The less popular of the city's two seaside resorts, Kijkduin, is located here. The district is divided into four neighbourhoods.
- Scheveningen (61,000 inhabitants) is the wealthy northernmost district of The Hague. A modern beach resort, Scheveningen is a popular tourist destination. It has a long sandy beach and its own esplanade, pier, and lighthouse, but also a Pathé cinema, a musical theatre, a casino, and a special Museum for Scheveningen. The district also includes a fishing harbour. Notable buildings include the Kurhaus and, farther inland, the Peace Palace.
- Segbroek (63,000 inhabitants) is a district located between Scheveningen and Loosduinen. The population decreased until around 2005, but since then has begun to grow again, driven by students and Eastern European immigrants. It became a district of The Hague in 1988 and is divided into five neighbourhoods.

=== Climate ===
The Hague experiences a temperate oceanic climate (Köppen: Cfb) similar to almost all of the Netherlands. Because of its location on the coast, it experiences milder winters and cooler summers than more inland locations. However, because of its location, it can also be extremely windy in the winter and humid in the summer. It also gets more sunshine.

Climate data for Valkenburg Naval Air Base
Month	Jan	Feb	Mar	Apr	May	Jun	Jul	Aug	Sep	Oct	Nov	Dec	Year
Record high °C (°F)	13.8 (56.8)	15.9 (60.6)	20.8 (69.4)	25.9 (78.6)	29.7 (85.5)	33.5 (92.3)	36.5 (97.7)	34.6 (94.3)	31.7 (89.1)	24.5 (76.1)	17.5 (63.5)	15.4 (59.7)	36.5 (97.7)
Mean daily maximum °C (°F)	6.4 (43.5)	6.9 (44.4)	9.8 (49.6)	13.6 (56.5)	17.0 (62.6)	19.6 (67.3)	21.6 (70.9)	21.8 (71.2)	18.9 (66.0)	14.7 (58.5)	10.2 (50.4)	7.1 (44.8)	14.0 (57.2)
Daily mean °C (°F)	4.1 (39.4)	4.2 (39.6)	6.4 (43.5)	9.4 (48.9)	12.8 (55.0)	15.6 (60.1)	17.8 (64.0)	17.8 (64.0)	15.0 (59.0)	11.4 (52.5)	7.6 (45.7)	4.8 (40.6)	10.6 (51.1)
Mean daily minimum °C (°F)	1.5 (34.7)	1.2 (34.2)	2.7 (36.9)	4.8 (40.6)	8.3 (46.9)	11.2 (52.2)	13.5 (56.3)	13.4 (56.1)	10.9 (51.6)	7.9 (46.2)	4.7 (40.5)	2.1 (35.8)	6.8 (44.2)
Record low °C (°F)	−16.4 (2.5)	−14.0 (6.8)	−11.1 (12.0)	−4.4 (24.1)	−1.5 (29.3)	1.7 (35.1)	5.4 (41.7)	5.5 (41.9)	1.2 (34.2)	−4.4 (24.1)	−7.1 (19.2)	−10.6 (12.9)	−16.4 (2.5)
Average precipitation mm (inches)	70.0 (2.76)	59.4 (2.34)	52.8 (2.08)	41.6 (1.64)	52.7 (2.07)	62.8 (2.47)	72.7 (2.86)	84.0 (3.31)	89.2 (3.51)	89.9 (3.54)	90.4 (3.56)	76.4 (3.01)	841.9 (33.15)
Average precipitation days (≥ 1 mm)	12	10	11	9	9	9	10	10	12	13	14	13	132
Average snowy days	5	5	3	1	0	0	0	0	0	0	2	4	20
Average relative humidity (%)	86	84	83	79	78	79	80	80	83	84	87	87	83
Mean monthly sunshine hours	71.7	96.7	152.0	207.2	240.5	229.3	237.5	213.4	160.0	116.7	68.2	56.5	1,849.7
Source 1: Royal Netherlands Meteorological Institute (1981–2010 normal, snowy days normal for 1971–2000)
Source 2: Royal Netherlands Meteorological Institute (1971–2000 extremes)

=== Cityscape ===
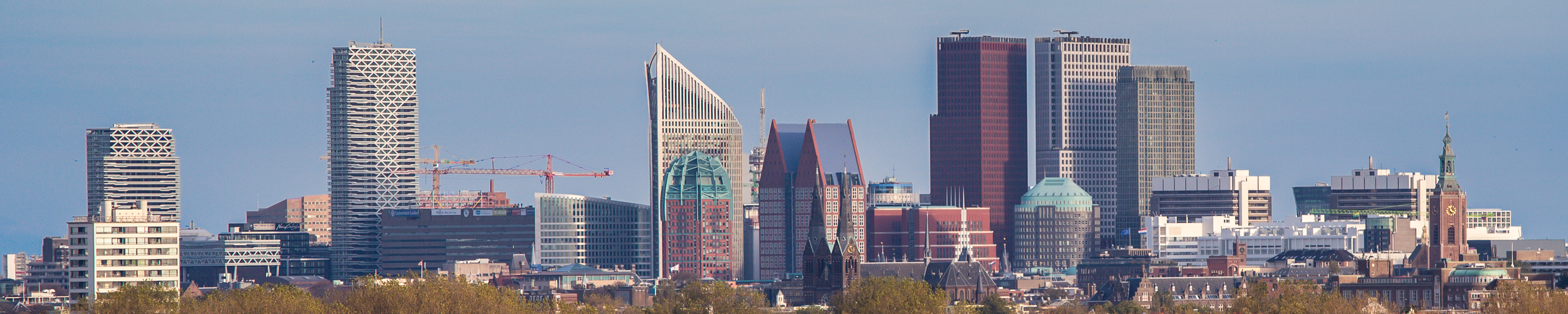

City life concentrates around the Hofvijver and the Binnenhof, where the States General of the Netherlands is located. Because of its history, the historical inner city of The Hague differs in various aspects from the nearby smaller cities of Leiden and Delft. It does not have a cramped inner city, bordered by canals and walls. Instead, it has some small streets in the town centre that may date from the late Middle Ages and several spacious streets boasting large and luxurious 18th-century residences built for diplomats and affluent Dutch families. It has a large church dating from the 15th century, a City Hall (built as such) from the 16th century, several large 17th-century palaces, a 17th-century Protestant church built in what was then a modern style, and many important 18th-century buildings.

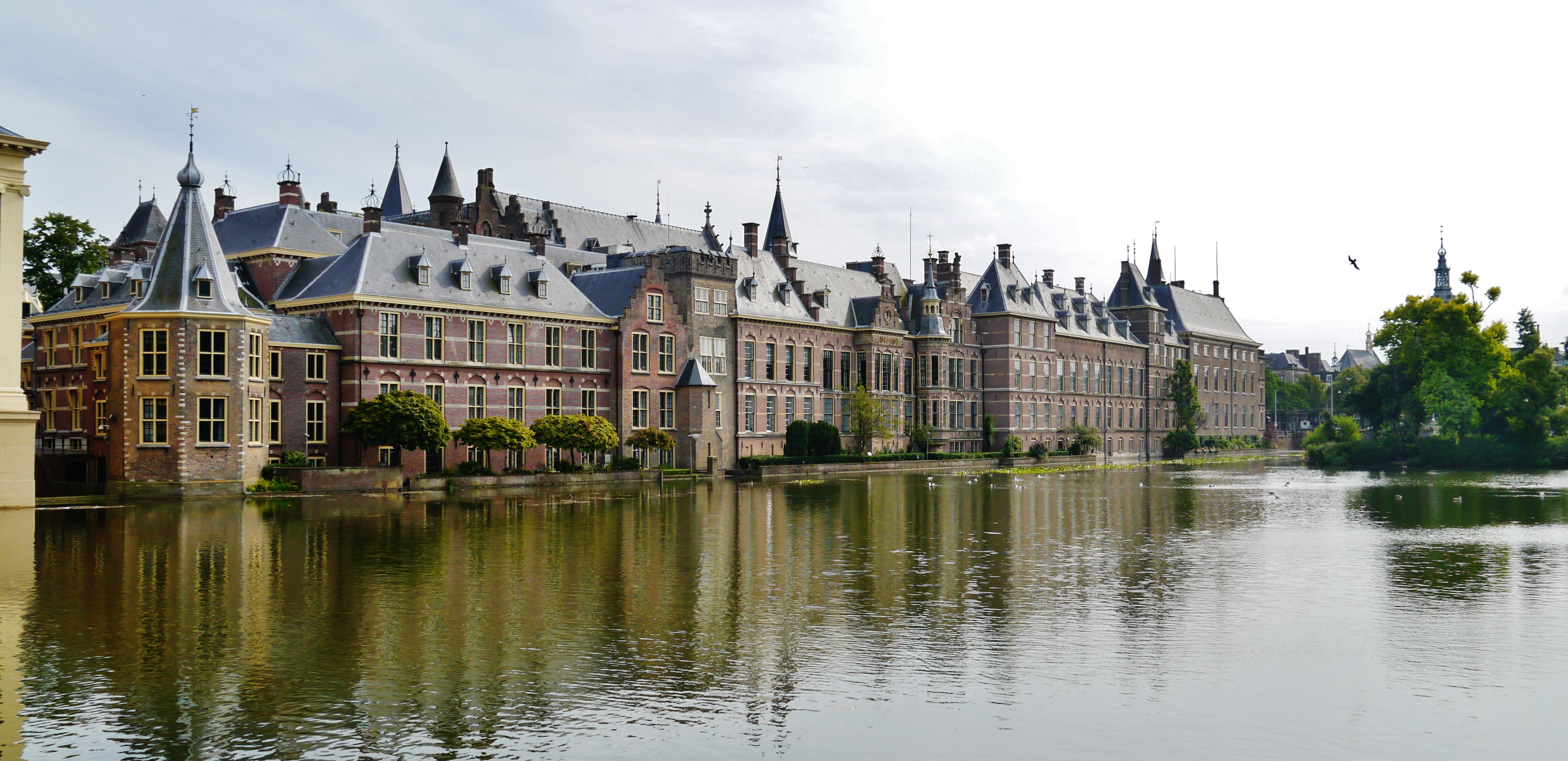
The Hofvijver and the buildings housing the States General of the Netherlands

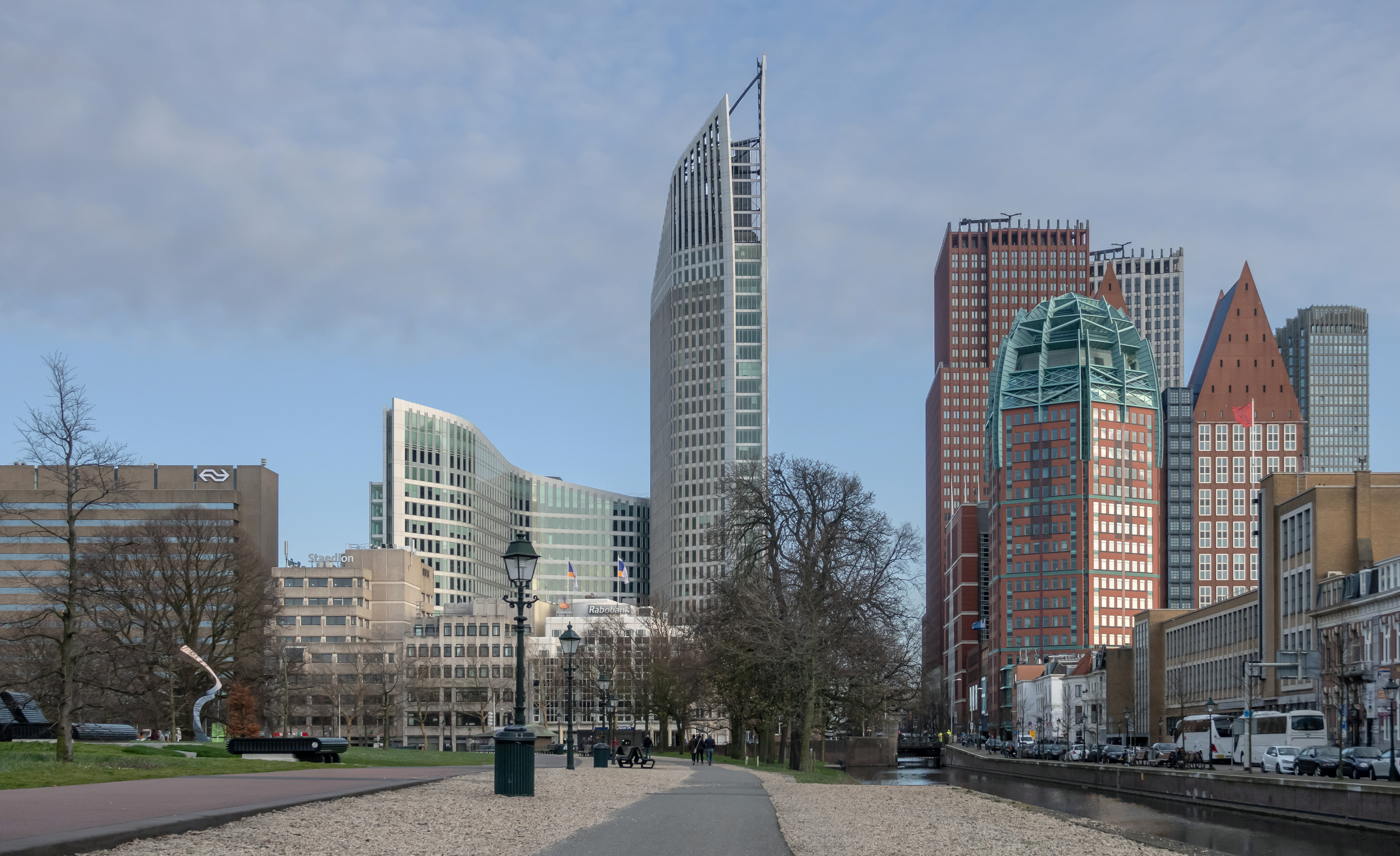
View of the Hoftoren (left) and the Ministry of Health, Welfare and Sport (the triangular gable right)

The city is becoming more student-friendly with the introduction of a new campus in 2012 of Leiden University as well as Leiden University College The Hague, which was established in 2010. The Royal Conservatory of The Hague and the Royal Academy of Art are also located there, as well as The Hague University, a vocational university, and a branch of the Open University of the Netherlands. The city has many civil servants and diplomats. In fact, the number and variety of foreign residents (especially the expatriates) make the city quite culturally diverse, with many foreign pubs, shops and cultural events.

The Hague is the largest Dutch city on the North Sea and includes two distinct beach resorts. The main beach resort, Scheveningen, in the northwestern part of the city, is a popular destination for tourists as well as for inhabitants. With 10 million visitors a year, it is the most popular beach town in the Benelux area. Kijkduin, southwest, is The Hague's other beach resort. It is significantly smaller and attracts mainly residents.

The former Dutch colony of the East Indies, now Indonesia, has left its mark on The Hague. Since the 19th century, high-level civil servants from the Dutch East Indies often spent long-term leave and vacations in The Hague. Many streets are named after places in the Netherlands East Indies (as well as other former Dutch colonies such as Suriname), and there is a sizable "Indo" (i.e., mixed Dutch-Indonesian) community. Since the loss of these Dutch possessions in December 1949, "Indo people", also known as "Indische people," often refer to The Hague as "the Widow of the Indies".

The older parts of the town have many characteristically wide and long streets. Houses are generally low-rise (often not more than three floors). A large part of the southwestern city was planned by the progressive Dutch architect H.P. Berlage about 1910. This 'Plan Berlage' determined the spacious and homely streets for several decades. In World War II, a large portion of the western portion of The Hague was destroyed by the Germans. Afterward, modernist architect W.M. Dudok planned its renewal, putting apartment blocks for the middle class in open, park-like settings.

The layout of the city is more spacious than other Dutch cities. Because of the incorporation of large and old nobility estates, the creation of various parks, and the use of green zones around natural streams, it is a much greener city than any other in the Netherlands. That is, except for some medieval close-knit streets in the centre. The Hague has a canal system around the old city centre, which is mainly used for boat tours around the city. Most of the canals were drained in the late 19th century, and some were filled between 1910 and 1970, but many have been restored recently.

The tallest buildings of The Hague are both 146-meter-tall ministries of Justice and Security and the Interior and Kingdom Relations of the Netherlands, designed by Hans Kollhoff. Other significant skyscrapers include the Hoftoren, Het Strijkijzer and De Kroon.

== Demographics ==
The Hague population pyramid in 2022

Historical population

Year	Pop.	±% p.a.
1369	1,494	—
1398	1,300	−0.48%
1477	6,066	+1.97%
1514	5,500	−0.26%
1550	6,000	+0.24%
1622	15,825	+1.36%
1632	16,600	+0.48%
1665	20,000	+0.57%
1732	33,500	+0.77%

Year	Pop.	±% p.a.
1795	38,433	+0.22%
1850	72,000	+1.15%
1874	90,000	+0.93%
1895	180,000	+3.36%
1900	206,022	+2.74%
1910	271,280	+2.79%
1920	359,610	+2.86%
1930	432,680	+1.87%
1940	504,262	+1.54%

Year	Pop.	±% p.a.
1950	558,849	+1.03%
1960	606,110	+0.82%
1970	550,613	−0.96%
1980	456,886	−1.85%
1990	441,506	−0.34%
2000	441,094	−0.01%
2010	488,553	+1.03%
2020	545,838	+1.11%
2023	562,839	+1.03%

Source: Lourens & Lucassen 1997, pp. 108–110 (1369–1795)
buurtmonitor.nl (1795–present)
Statistics Netherlands

City of Den Haag population by country of origin (2018)
Country/Territory	Population
Netherlands	246,633 (43%)
Suriname	46,346 (8.70%)
Turkey	40,064 (7.52%)
Morocco	31,455 (5.91%)
Indonesia	17,635 (3.31%)
Poland	14,094 (2.65%)
(Netherlands) Dutch Caribbean	13,218 (2.48%)
Other	123,116 (26%)

Religions in The Hague (2015)
1. Irreligion (49.6%)
2. Roman Catholic (14.9%)
3. Protestant Church in the Netherlands (9.40%)
4. Other Christian denominations (5.70%)
5. Islam (14.7%)
6. Hinduism (4.80%)
7. Buddhism (0.80%)
8. Judaism (0.20%)

As of 1 January 2021, The Hague counts 549,163 inhabitants, making it the third-largest city in the Netherlands. Between 1800 and 1960, the city saw considerable growth from 40,000 in 1800 to 200,000 in 1900 and eventually 600,000 in 1960. The growth following 1900 was partially caused by the Housing Act of 1901, which stimulated the expansion of cities such as The Hague. In the period between 1960 and 1980, The Hague saw a shrinkage from 600,000 to 440,000 inhabitants, caused mostly by spatial policy, demographic processes, and lack of space. After several annexations and housing constructions, The Hague has since grown again, celebrating its 500,000th inhabitant in 2011. The municipality expects the growth to continue to just over 600,000 inhabitants by 2030.

The demonym of The Hague officially is Hagenaar, but the term Hagenees is informally used for someone who was born and raised in The Hague. The usage of these demonyms appears to be class-bound, with Hagenaar being the upper-class term and Hagenees being that of the lower-class.

=== Origin make-up ===
43% of the population of The Hague has two parents who were born in the Netherlands, while 15.6% have at least one parent who was born abroad in a Western country, and 34.4% have at least one parent who was born in a non-Western country.

=== Inhabitants by birthplace ===
2020	Numbers	%
Both parents born in NL	242,441	44.42%
Western migration background	105,315	19.29%
Non-Western migration background	198,082	36.29%
Suriname	45,783	8.39%
Turkey	41,122	7.53%
Morocco	32,355	5.93%
Indonesia	17,187	3.15%
Netherlands Antilles and Aruba	14,037	2.57%
Total	545,838	100%

=== Religion ===
Just under half of The Hague's population identifies with a religious group. The two most popular religions are Christianity (29%) and Islam (14.1%). Religiosity is higher among people with a recent migration background from Indonesia, Turkey, Morocco, and Suriname. Islam is the most common religion among people with a Turkish or Moroccan migration background. Among people of Surinamese heritage, there is more religious diversity, with Hinduism being the most common. Of The Hague's native Dutch population, most people adhere to Christianity. Just under 40% of the population of The Hague regularly attends a house of worship.

== Politics ==
=== Municipal council ===
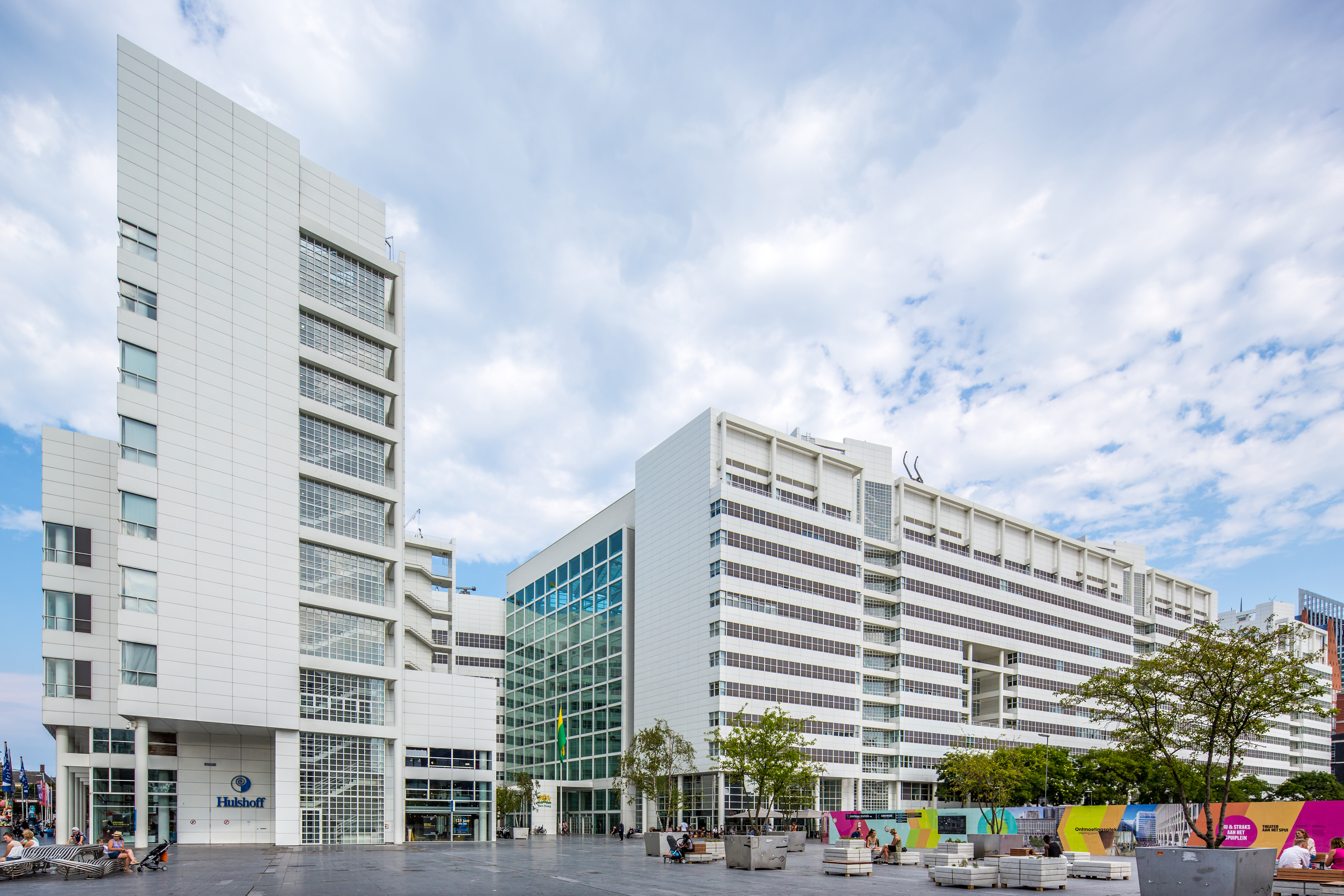
The Hague City Hall

Following the 2026 The Hague municipal election, the municipal council of The Hague contains eleven groups, most notably Heart for The Hague (HvDH; 16 seats), Democrats 66 (D66; 8 seats), and the Progressive Netherlands (Pro; 7 seats).

Group	Seats
Heart for The Hague	16 / 45
Democrats 66	8 / 45
Progressive Netherlands	7 / 45
People's Party for Freedom and Democracy	3 / 45
Denk	3 / 45
Party for the Animals	2 / 45
Christian Democratic Appeal	2 / 45
Socialist Party	1 / 45
Forum for Democracy	1 / 45
Volt Netherlands	1 / 45
Christian Union–SGP	1 / 45
Source: Municipal Council

=== Municipal executive ===
After the 2026 municipal elections, the local right-wing populist party Hart voor Den Haag formed a coalition with the VVD, DENK and CDA. From 16 July 2026, the municipal executive has been as follows:

Name	Party	Portfolio
Jan van Zanen	VVD	Mayor; Safety of The Hague, Police Unit The Hague, Fire Department, President of the City Council, Chairman of the Municipal Executive
Richard de Mos	HvDH	Alderman; Economy, International Affairs and the National Programme for the Southwest
Henk Harms	HvDH	Alderman; Area Development and Spatial Planning
Mariëtte van Leeuwen	HvDH	Alderwoman; Youth and Education
Ralf Sluijs	HvDH	Alderman; Care and Welfare
Arjen Dubbelaar	HvDH	Alderman; Social Services, Migrant Workers and City Districts & Neighbourhoods
Lotte van Basten Batenburg	VVD	Alderwoman; Finance, Culture and Scheveningen
Isabelle Broeders	VVD	Alderwoman; Outdoor Spaces, Energy Transition and Regional Cooperation
Nur Icar	Denk	Alderman; Work, Income and Sport
Adeel Mahmood	Denk	Alderman; Mobility, Services and Municipal Organisation
Kavish Partiman	CDA	Alderman; Social Housing, Integration and Volunteering

On 1 October 2019, the National Department of Criminal Investigation (Rijksrecherche) performed a raid on the homes and offices of then-aldermen Richard de Mos and Rachid Guernaoui, as part of an investigation into alleged administrative corruption, bribery, and violation of confidentiality. The offices of several municipal civil servants and the homes of three entrepreneurs were also searched for the investigation. The aldermen were suspected of receiving bribes in exchange for granting permits. In April 2023, De Mos and Guernaoui were acquitted of all charges.

=== City of Peace and Justice ===
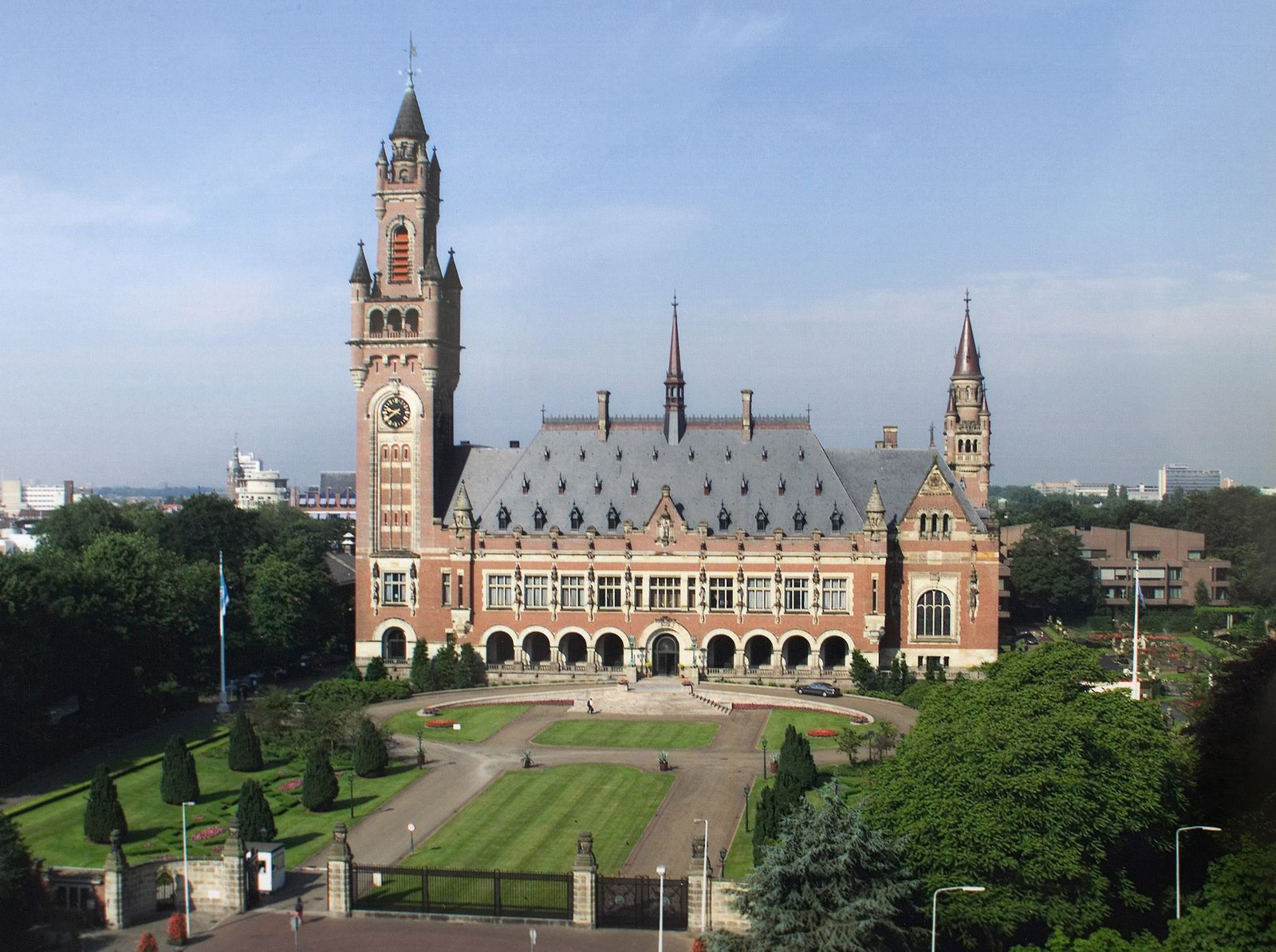
The Peace Palace, headquarters of the International Court of Justice and Permanent Court of Arbitration.

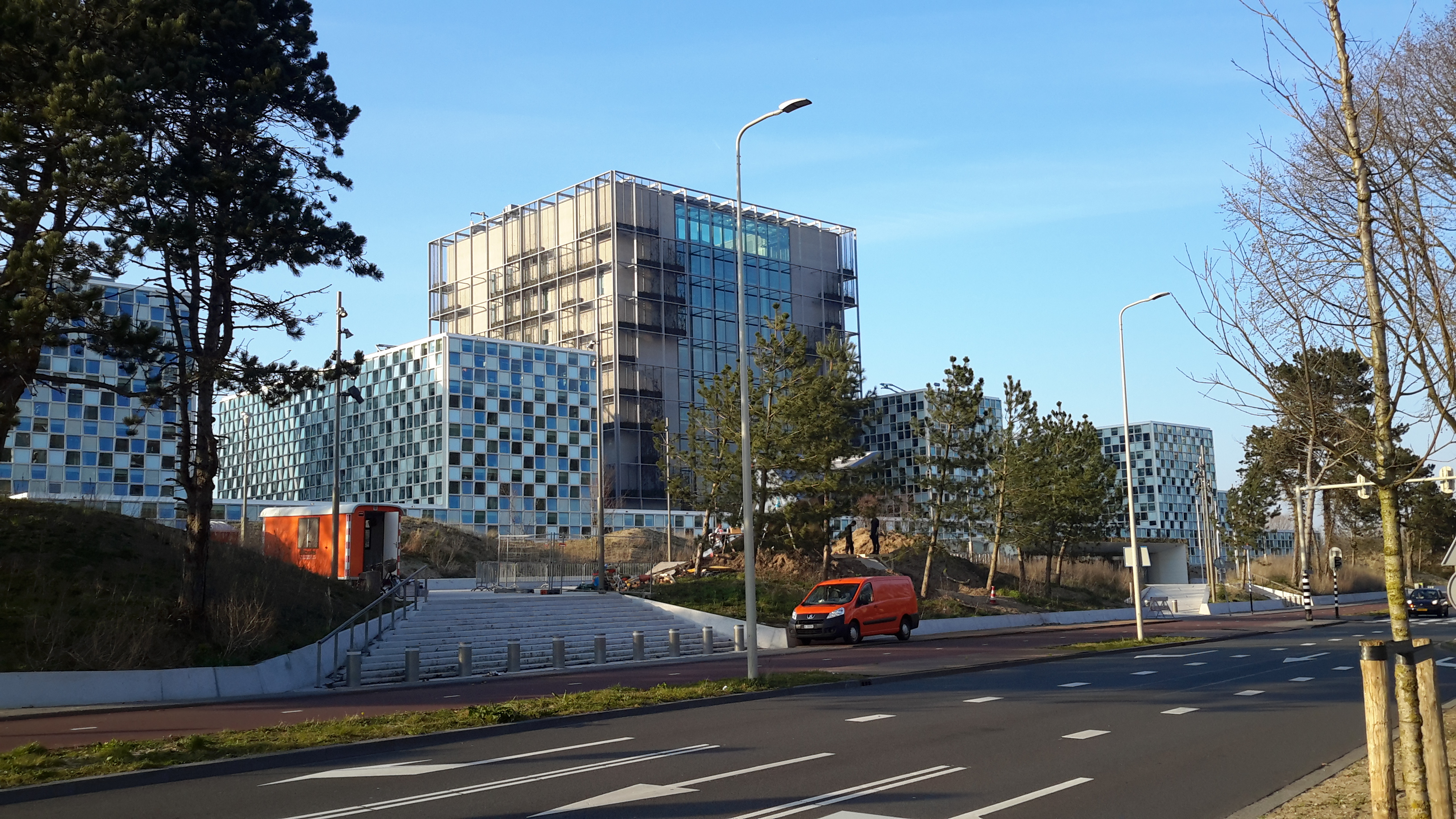
International Criminal Court

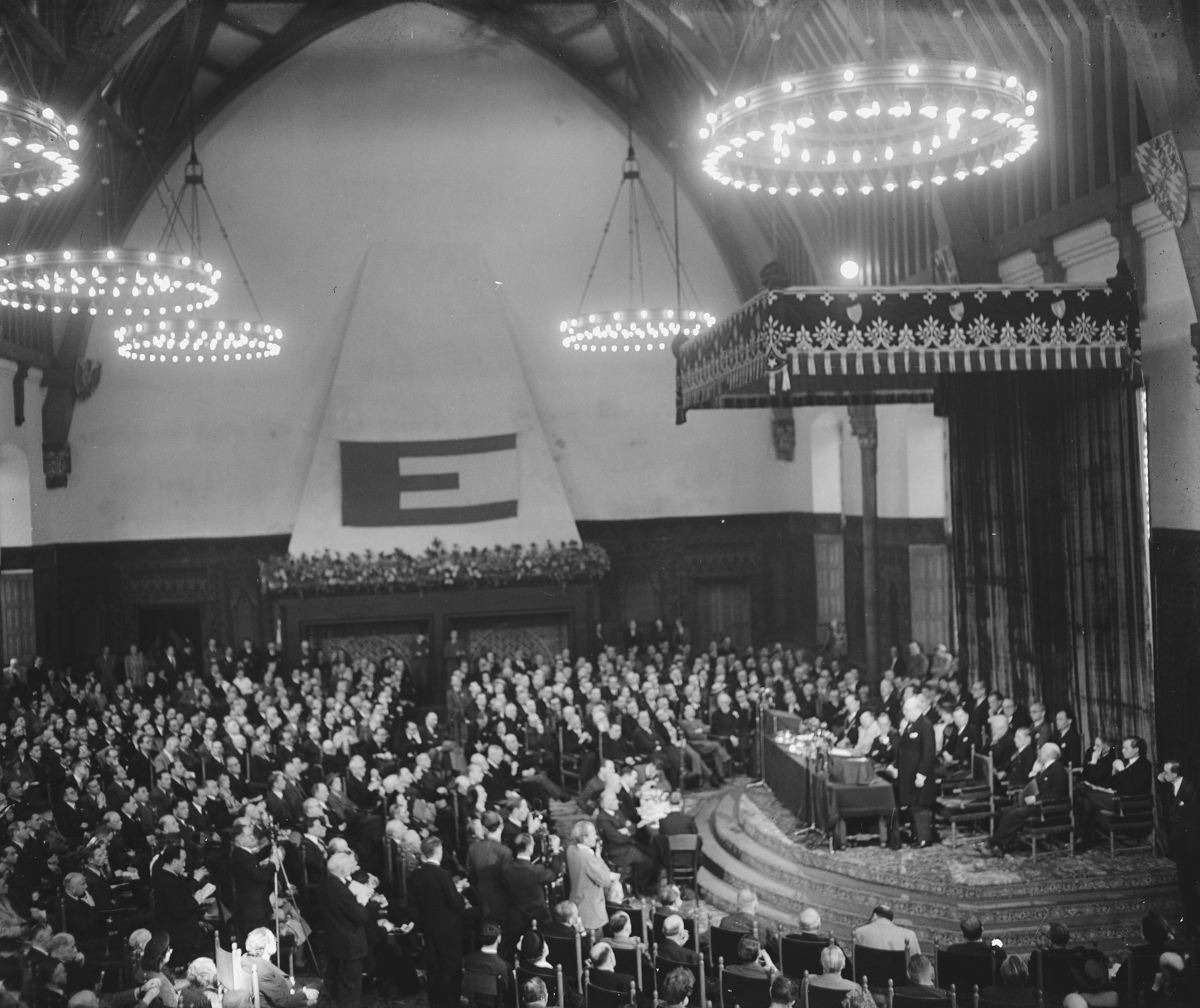
Meeting in the Hall of Knights during the Congress of Europe (9 May 1948)

The Hague is home to many different international judicial bodies, such as the Permanent Court of Arbitration (PCA), the International Court of Justice (ICJ), the International Criminal Court (ICC), and the International Residual Mechanism for Criminal Tribunals (IRMCT). It houses Scheveningen Prison, the ICC's detention centre for those suspected of war crimes and other violations of international law. The Hague is the fourth major centre for the United Nations, after New York, Geneva and Vienna.

The foundation of The Hague as an "international city of peace and justice" started at the end of the 19th century, when the international community chose The Hague as the home of the Permanent Court of Arbitration (PCA), the world's first organisation for the settlement of international disputes, during the first global peace conference. The subsequent construction of the PCA's headquarters, the Peace Palace, between 1907 and 1913 gave this new international institution an architectural symbol worthy of its global mission. After the establishment of the League of Nations, The Hague became the seat of the Permanent Court of International Justice, which was replaced (after World War II) by the UN's International Court of Justice. The establishment of the Iran–United States Claims Tribunal (1981), the International Criminal Tribunal for the former Yugoslavia (1993), and the International Criminal Court (2002) in the city further consolidated its role as a centre for international legal arbitration. Most recently, on 1 March 2009, the Special Tribunal for Lebanon, a UN tribunal to investigate and prosecute suspects in the 2005 assassination of Lebanese Prime Minister Rafik Hariri, opened in the former headquarters of the Dutch General Intelligence and Security Service in Leidschendam, a town within the greater area of The Hague.

Other major international and European organisations based in The Hague include:

- Europol, European Union Agency for Law Enforcement Cooperation
- Eurojust, European Union Agency for Criminal Justice Cooperation
- Europeana, European Union digital platform for cultural heritage
- The Hague Academy of International Law, centre for high-level education in both public and private international law
- Hague Conference on Private International Law (HCCH), the oldest and preeminent private international law harmonisation institution
- International Commission on Missing Persons (ICMP)
- European Patent Office
- Unrepresented Nations and Peoples Organization
- NATO Communications and Information Agency, (NCI Agency)
- Organisation for the Prohibition of Chemical Weapons (OPCW)
- The European Library

Many academic institutions in the fields of international relations, international law, and international development are based in The Hague. The Hague Academic Coalition (HAC) is a consortium of those institutions.

Its member institutions are:

- Carnegie Foundation
- Hague Institute for the Internationalisation of Law (HiiL)
- International Institute of Social Studies (ISS) of Erasmus University Rotterdam
- Leiden University College The Hague
- Netherlands Institute of International Relations 'Clingendael'
- The Hague Academy of International Law
- The Hague University of Applied Sciences
- T.M.C. Asser Instituut

In 1948, the Congress of Europe was held with 750 delegates from 26 European governments, providing them with the opportunity to discuss ideas about the development of European integration, which eventually culminated in the creation of the modern-day European Union.

== Economy ==
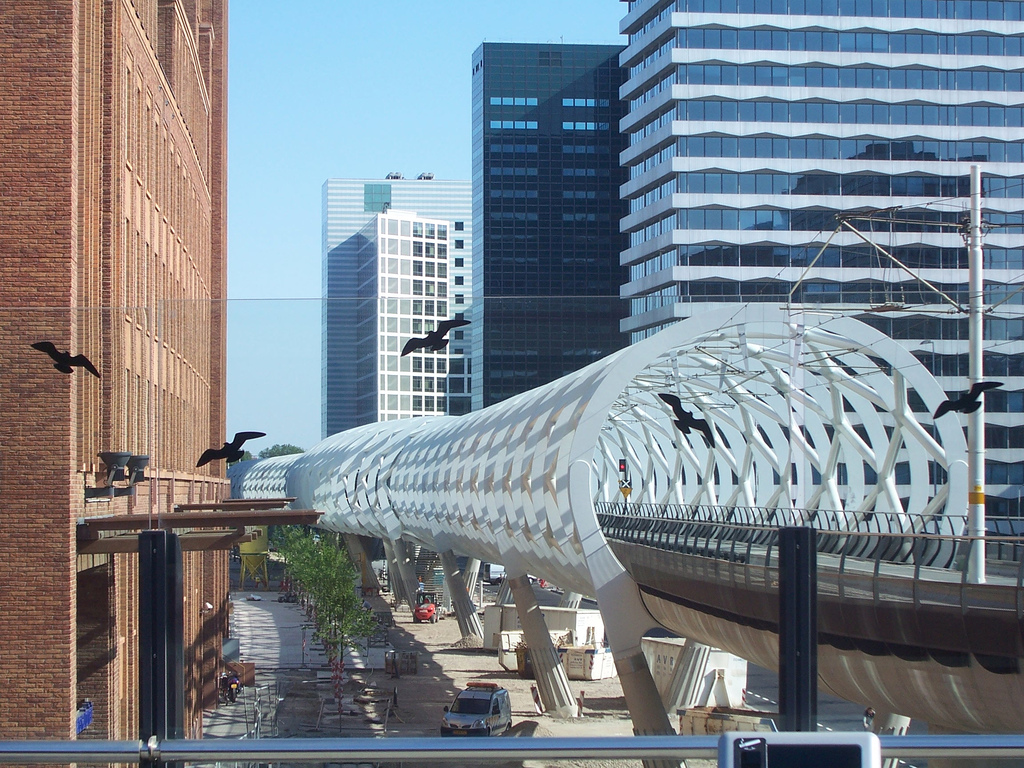
The Hague's central financial district, Beatrixkwartier, with the modern tram viaduct called the Netkous ("Fishnet stocking")

The Hague has a service-oriented economy. Professional life in the city is dominated by a large number of civil servants and diplomats working in the city; as of 2006, 26% of the jobs in The Hague are those offered by the Dutch government or international institutions. Large employers in this sector include the ministries of Defence, Justice, Housing, Spatial Planning and the Environment, Foreign Affairs, the Ministry of the Interior and Kingdom Relations and Transport, Public Works and Water Management.

Several large international businesses have their headquarters in The Hague. Significant companies headquartered in The Hague include Aegon, APM Terminals, Damco, NIBC Bank, Chicago Bridge & Iron Company and PostNL. The city is also host to the regional headquarters of Siemens, T-Mobile, AT&T, Huawei, Kuwait Petroleum Corporation, McDermott International, Saudi Aramco, TotalEnergies and Worley. There has never been any large-scale industrial activity in The Hague, with the possible exception of the fishing activities of the harbour in Scheveningen. Many of the city's logistical and minor-industrial services are in the Binckhorst in the Laak district, which contains many sizeable warehouses.

The city is the second biggest Dutch tourist destination after Amsterdam. In 2012, The Hague welcomed 1.2 million tourists, half of whom came from abroad. Tourists spend an average of €2 billion a year in the local economy. 1 in 10 residents makes their living in the tourism sector.

== Culture ==
The Hague originated around the 13th century Binnenhof, and this is still considered the cultural centre of the city. Nightlife centres around the three main squares in the city centre. The Plein (meaning "Plaza" or "Town square") is taken by several large sidewalk cafés, where politicians are often spotted. The Grote Markt (literally "Big Market") is completely strewn with chairs and tables, summer or winter. The Buitenhof (literally "Outer Courtyard", located just outside the Binnenhof) contains a six-screen Pathé cinema and a handful of bars and restaurants in the immediate vicinity. Adjacent to the Buitenhof is De Passage, the country's first covered shopping mall. Dating from the late 19th century, it contains many expensive and speciality shops. One of the country's largest music venues, Paard van Troje, can be found in the centre of The Hague. Another popular music venue in The Hague is Muziekcafé de Paap.

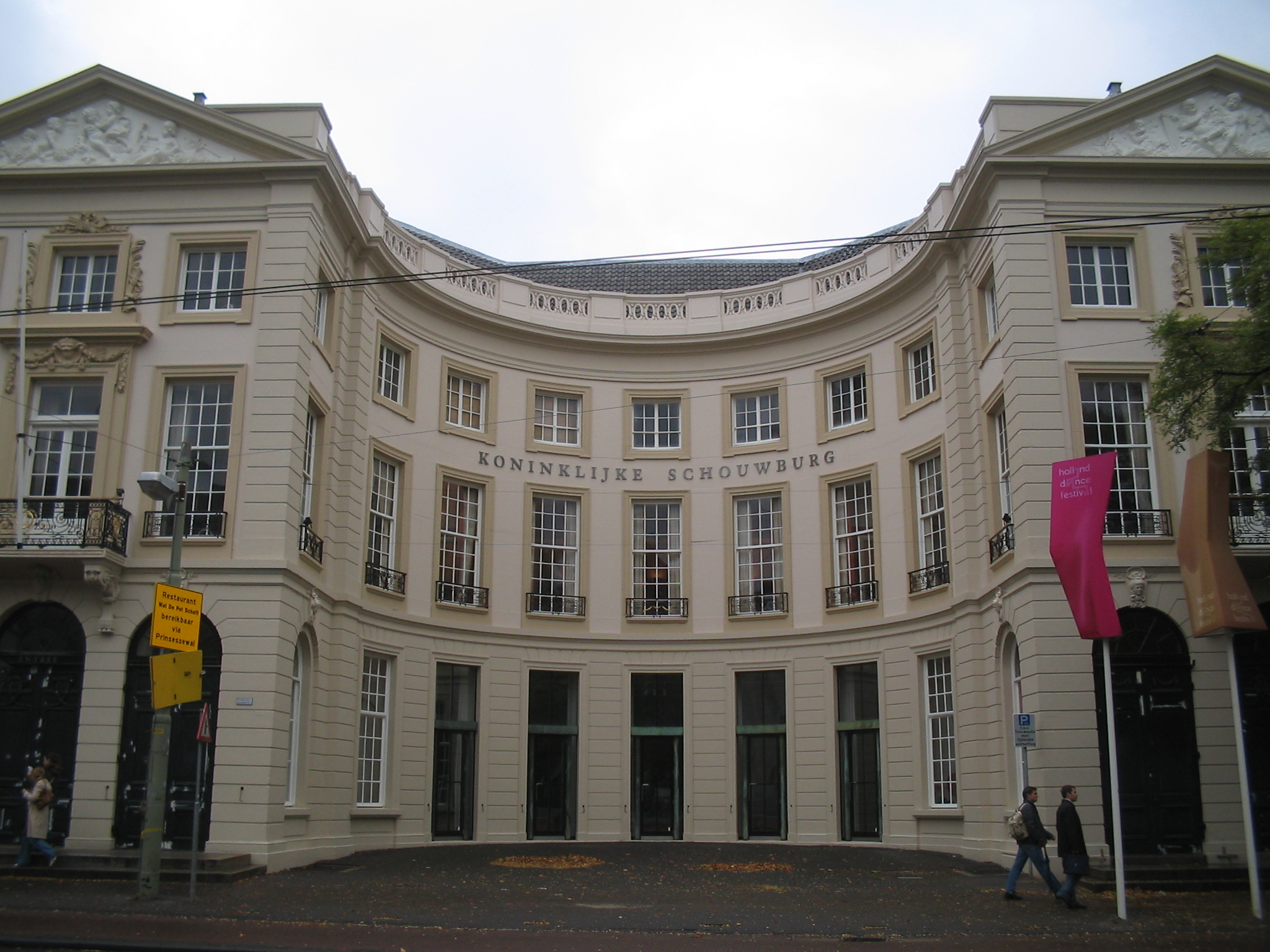
The Koninklijke Schouwburg, home to Het Nationale Theater

The Spuiplein is a modern fourth square in the city centre, opposite the Nieuwe Kerk. Besides the City Hall, this was also the location of the Anton Philipszaal, home to the Residentie Orchestra, and the Lucent Danstheater, home to the internationally celebrated modern dance company Nederlands Dans Theater. These buildings, designed by Rem Koolhaas in 1988, have been demolished to make space for a new theatre, Amare, which would house both institutes as well as the Royal Conservatory. Despite the efforts of the municipality, public support for the proposed theatre remains low. At the heart of the city centre, across the palace gardens, is the home of Summerschool Den Haag, an international school for dance with guest teachers such as Valentina Scaglia, Igone de Jongh, and Maia Makhateli. The Koninklijke Schouwburg, home to Het Nationale Theater, can also be found in the city centre – on the Korte Voorhout. New European Ensemble is a collective for contemporary music consisting of international musicians. The ensemble has its main base in the city.

Scheveningen forms a second cultural centre of The Hague, having its own Pathé cinema as well as the musical theatre Circustheater, although, especially in the summer, most nightlife concentrates around the seafront boulevard with its bars, restaurants, and gambling halls. Several other attractions can be found in Scheveningen, such as the miniature park Madurodam, the Beelden aan Zee museum, and a Sea Life Centre.

The Hague is the residence of the Dutch monarch, and several (former) royal palaces can be found in the city. King Willem-Alexander of the Netherlands and Queen Máxima of the Netherlands live in Huis ten Bosch in the Haagse Bos and work in the Noordeinde Palace in the city centre. Moreover, there are two former royal palaces in The Hague. The Kneuterdijk Palace, built in 1716, is now home to the Council of State of the Netherlands, and the Lange Voorhout Palace is now occupied by the Escher Museum, dedicated to Dutch graphic artist M. C. Escher.

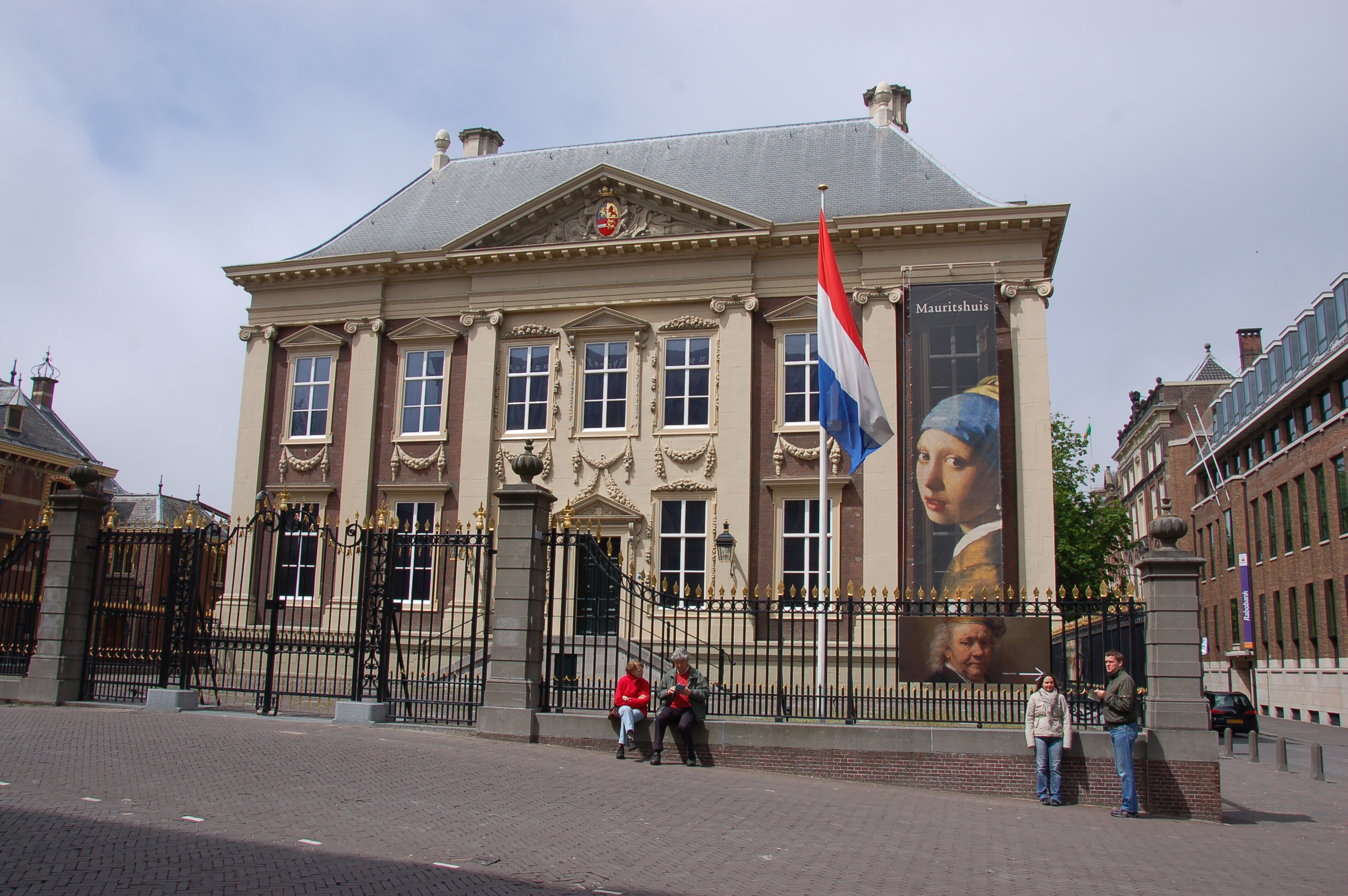
Mauritshuis

The Hague has numerous museums, most notably the Mauritshuis, located next to the Binnenhof, which exhibits many paintings by old masters up to 1800, such as Johannes Vermeer, Rembrandt van Rijn and Paulus Potter. The art museum Kunstmuseum, housed in a striking building by architect HP Berlage, exhibits art from after 1800, including the world's largest collection of paintings by Piet Mondrian. Other museums include the science museum Museon, the historic museum Haags Historisch Museum, the national postal museum Museum voor Communicatie, the Museum Bredius, the Louis Couperus Museum, the museum Beelden aan Zee in Scheveningen, Panorama Mesdag, and the Gevangenpoort, a former prison housed in a 15th-century gatehouse.

Since early times, possibly as far back as the 16th century, the stork has been the symbol of The Hague. Several films have been (partially) shot in The Hague, including Mindhunters (2004), Hum Tum (2004), Ocean's Twelve (2004), Black Book (2006) and Sonny Boy (2011). Parts of the second season of the Netflix series Sense8 were filmed in The Hague. Notable actors and filmmakers from The Hague include Martin Koolhoven, Georgina Verbaan, Carel Struycken, Frederique van der Wal, Marwan Kenzari, Anna Drijver, Renée Soutendijk and Paul Verhoeven, who grew up in the city from an early age.

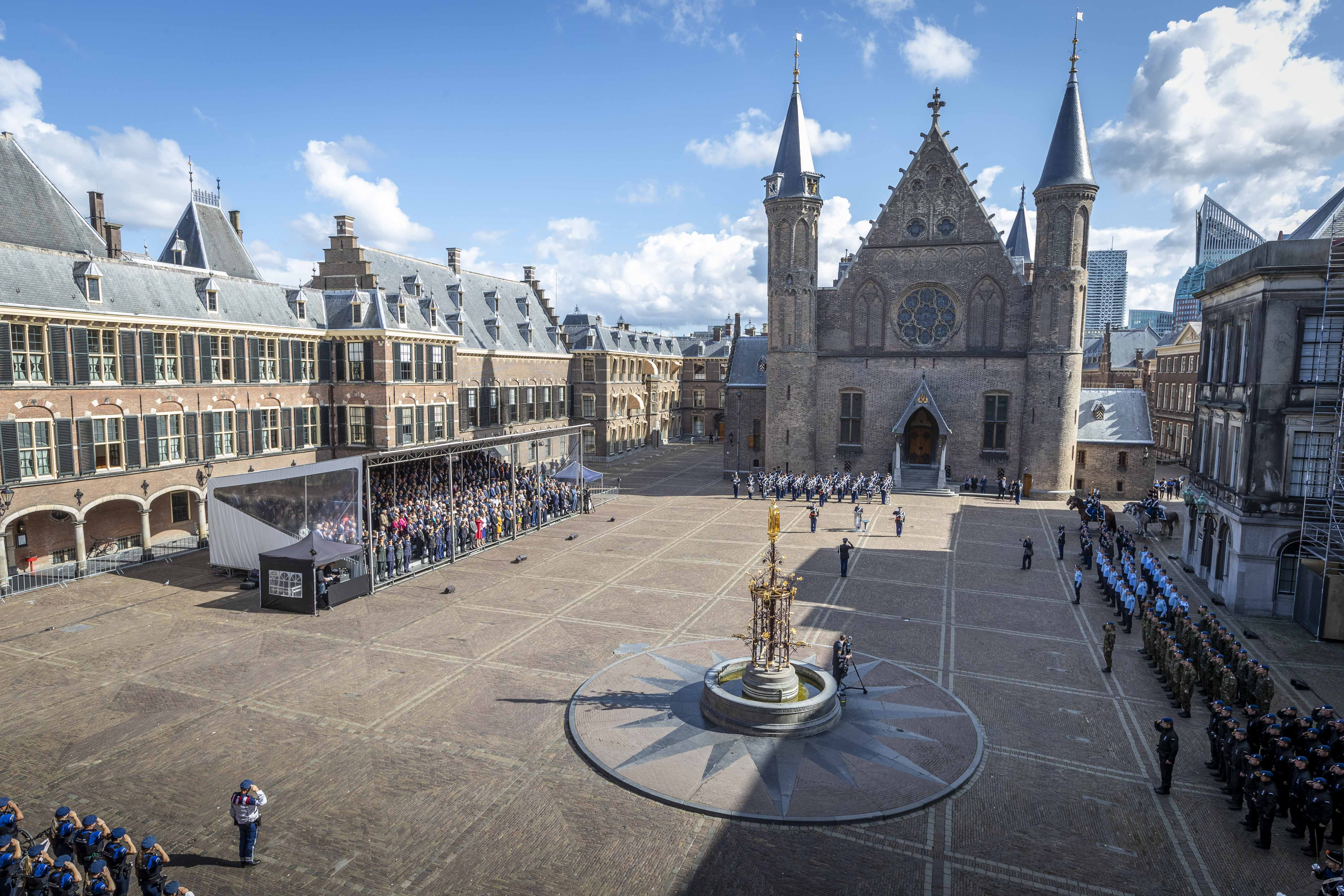
The Ridderzaal inside the Binnenhof, the political centre of the Netherlands

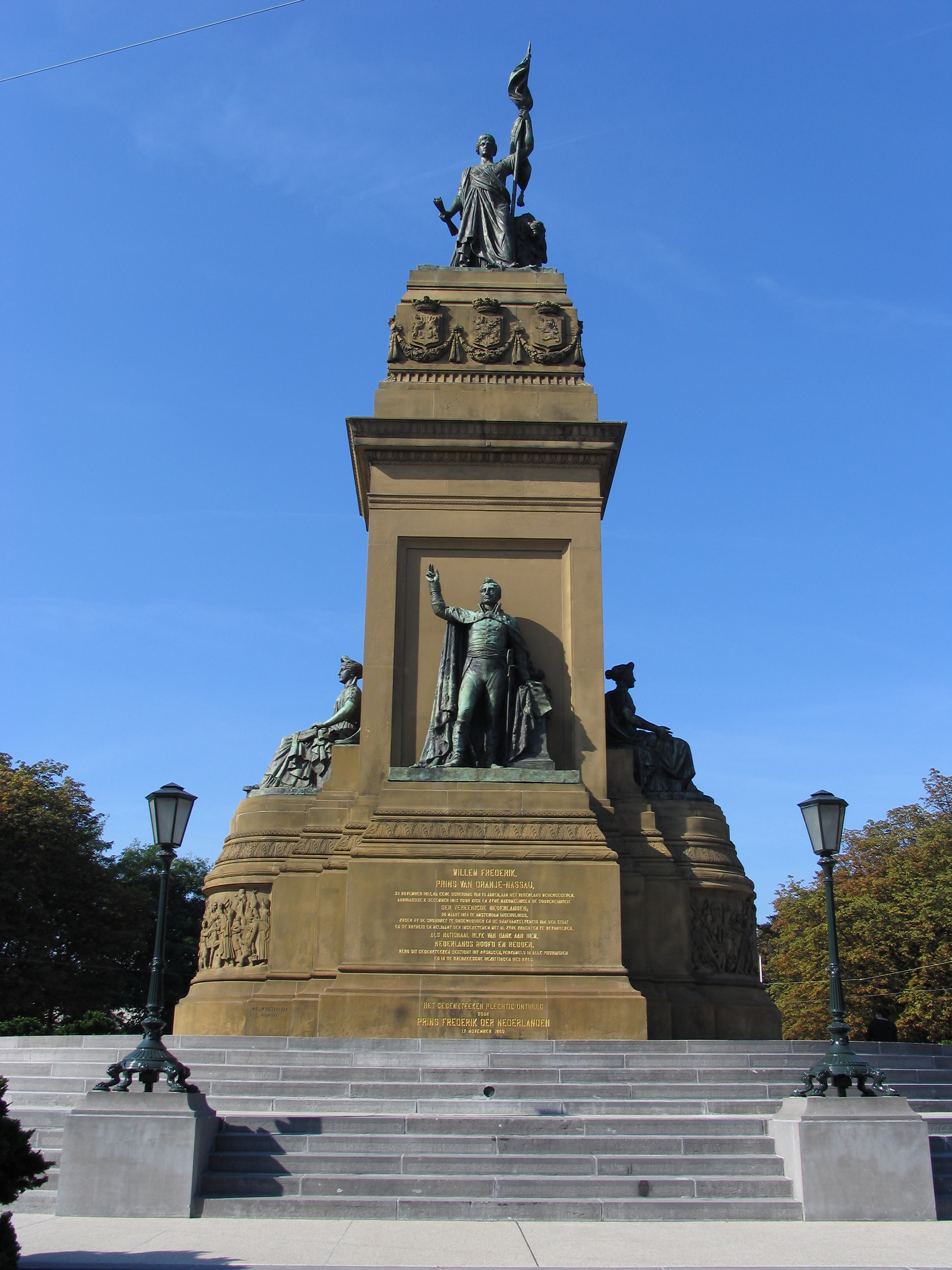
Monument commemorating the founding of the Kingdom of the Netherlands at Plein 1813

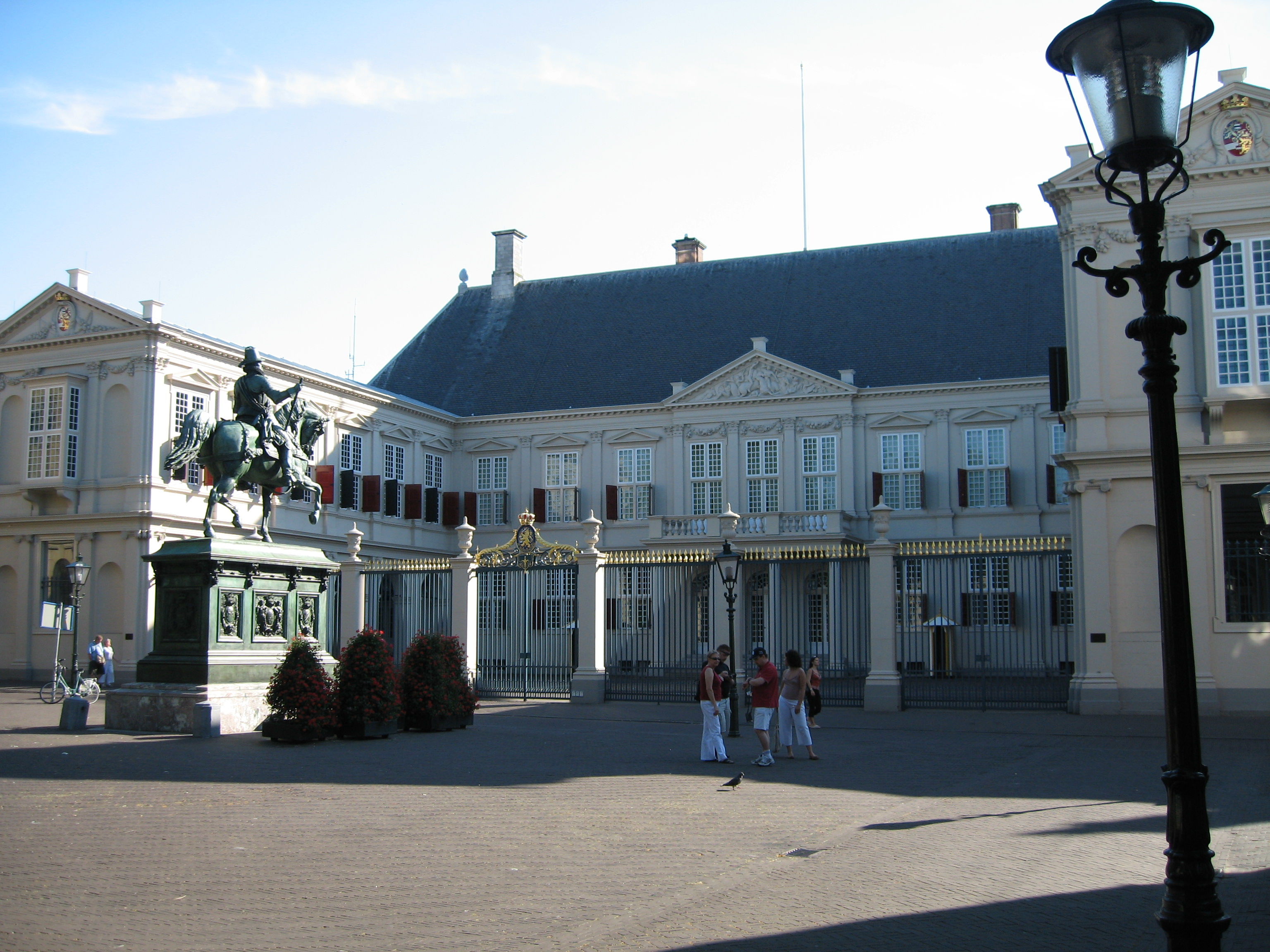
Noordeinde Palace

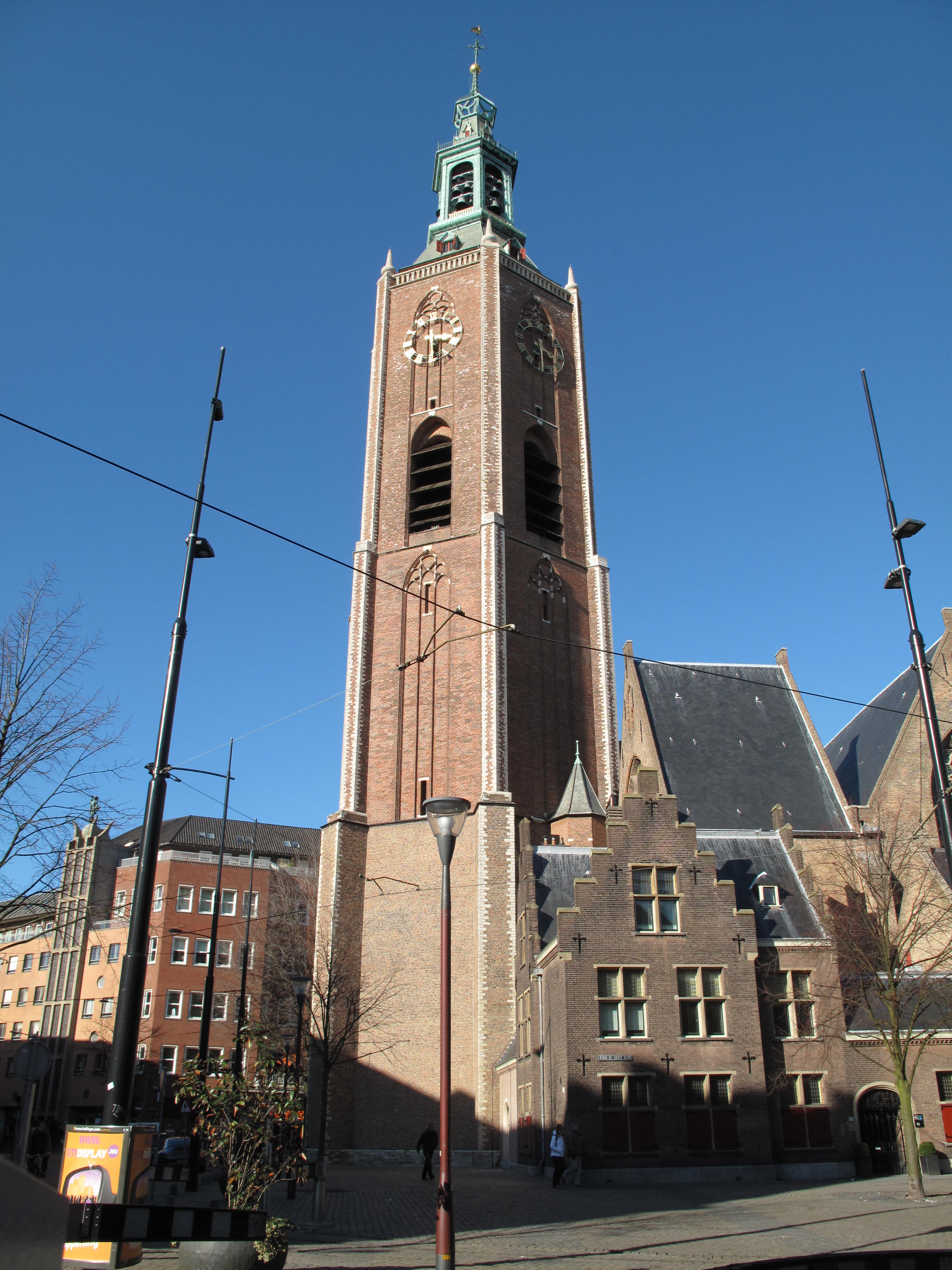
Grote or Sint-Jacobskerk

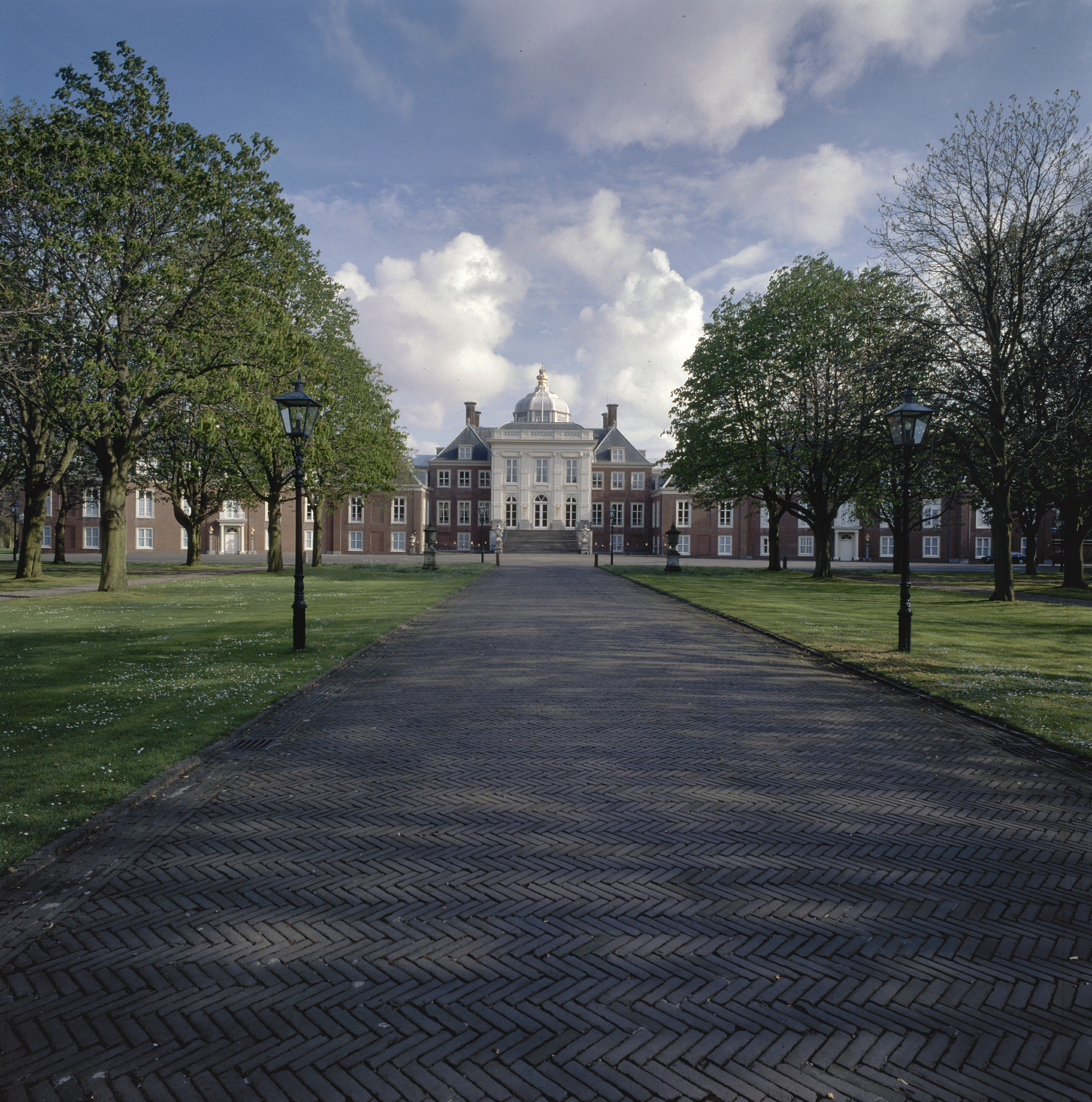
Huis ten Bosch is the residence of the King.

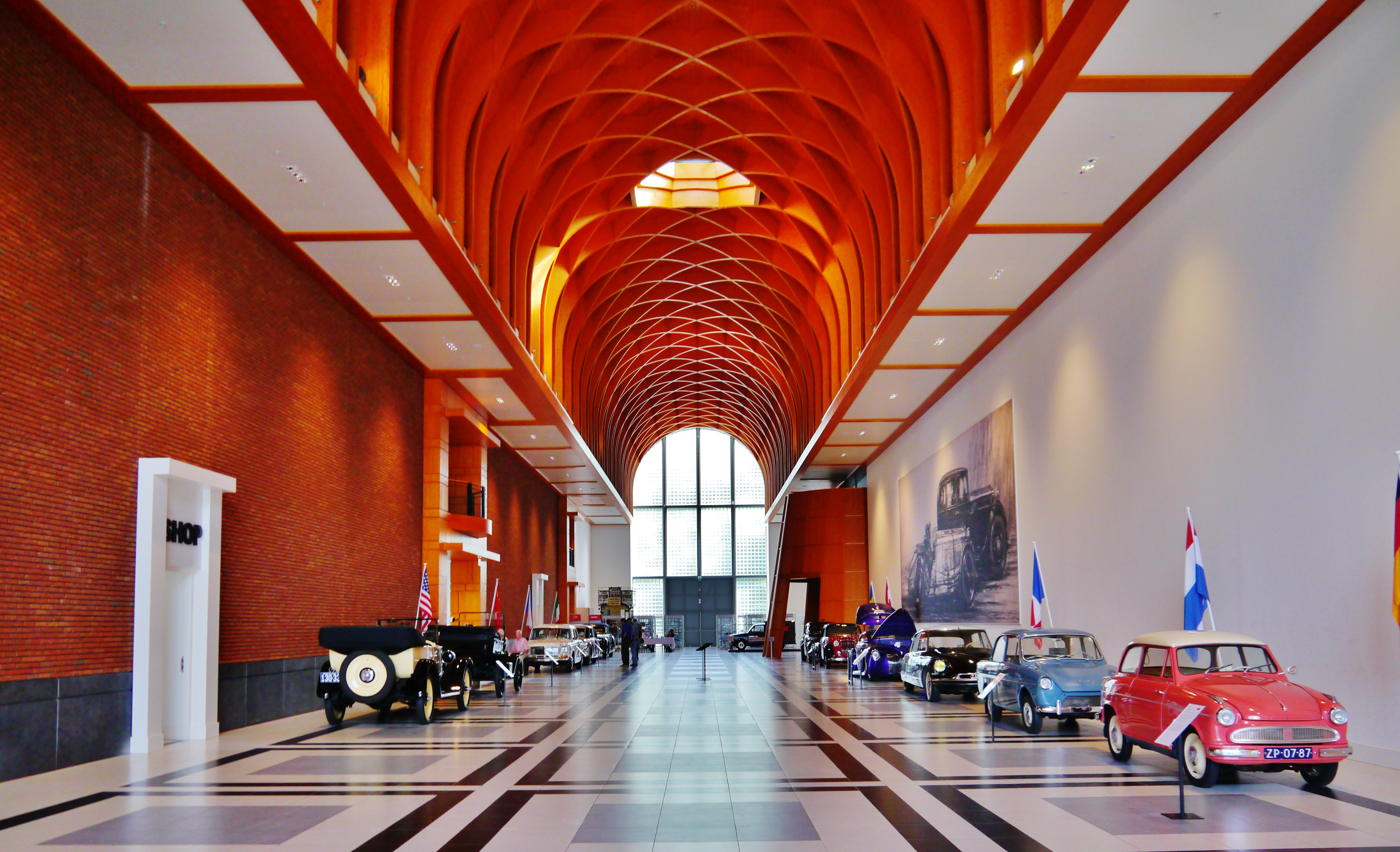
Louwman Museum is a museum for historic cars, coaches, and motorcycles.

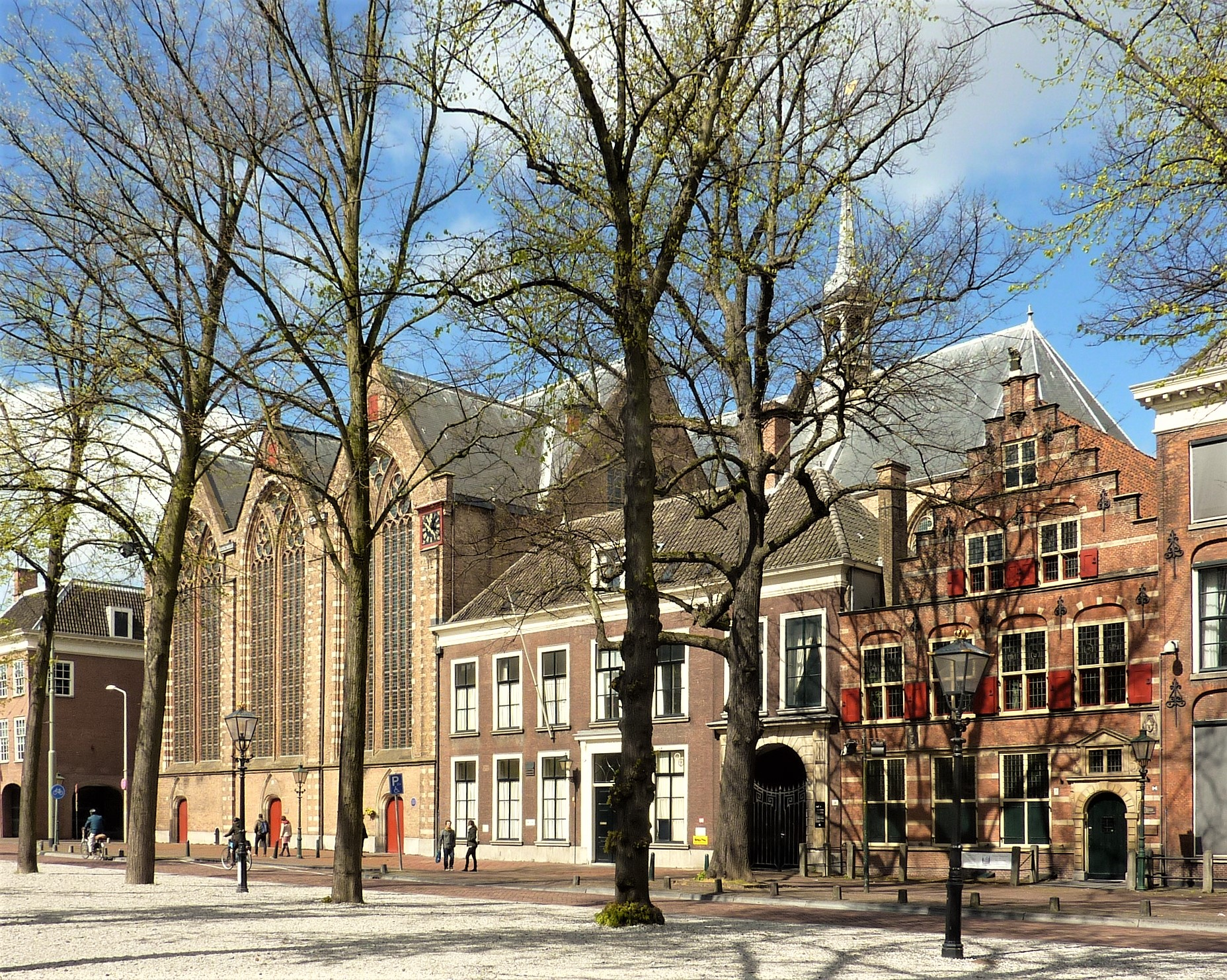
The Lange Voorhout is a street in the old city centre

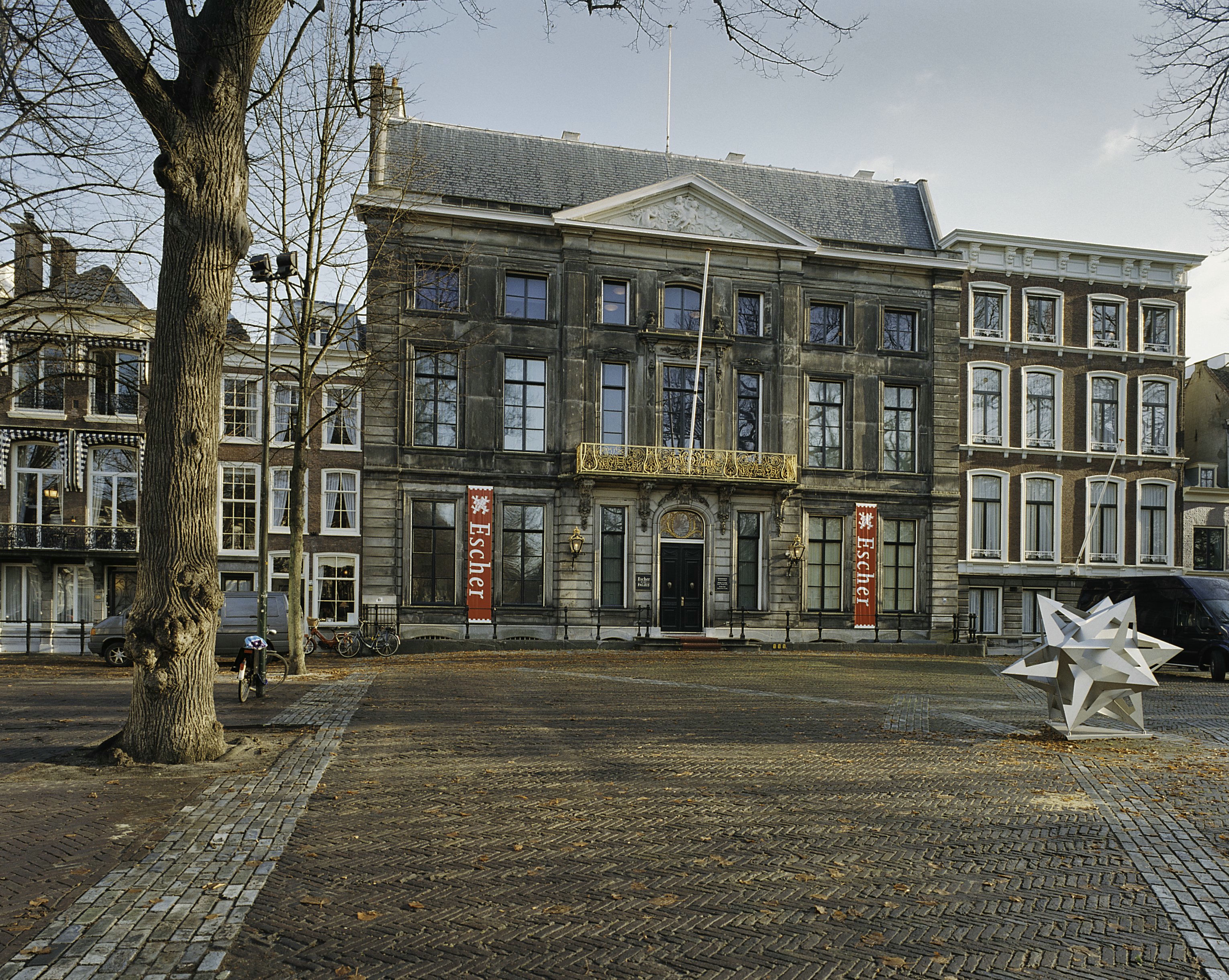
Escher in the Palace

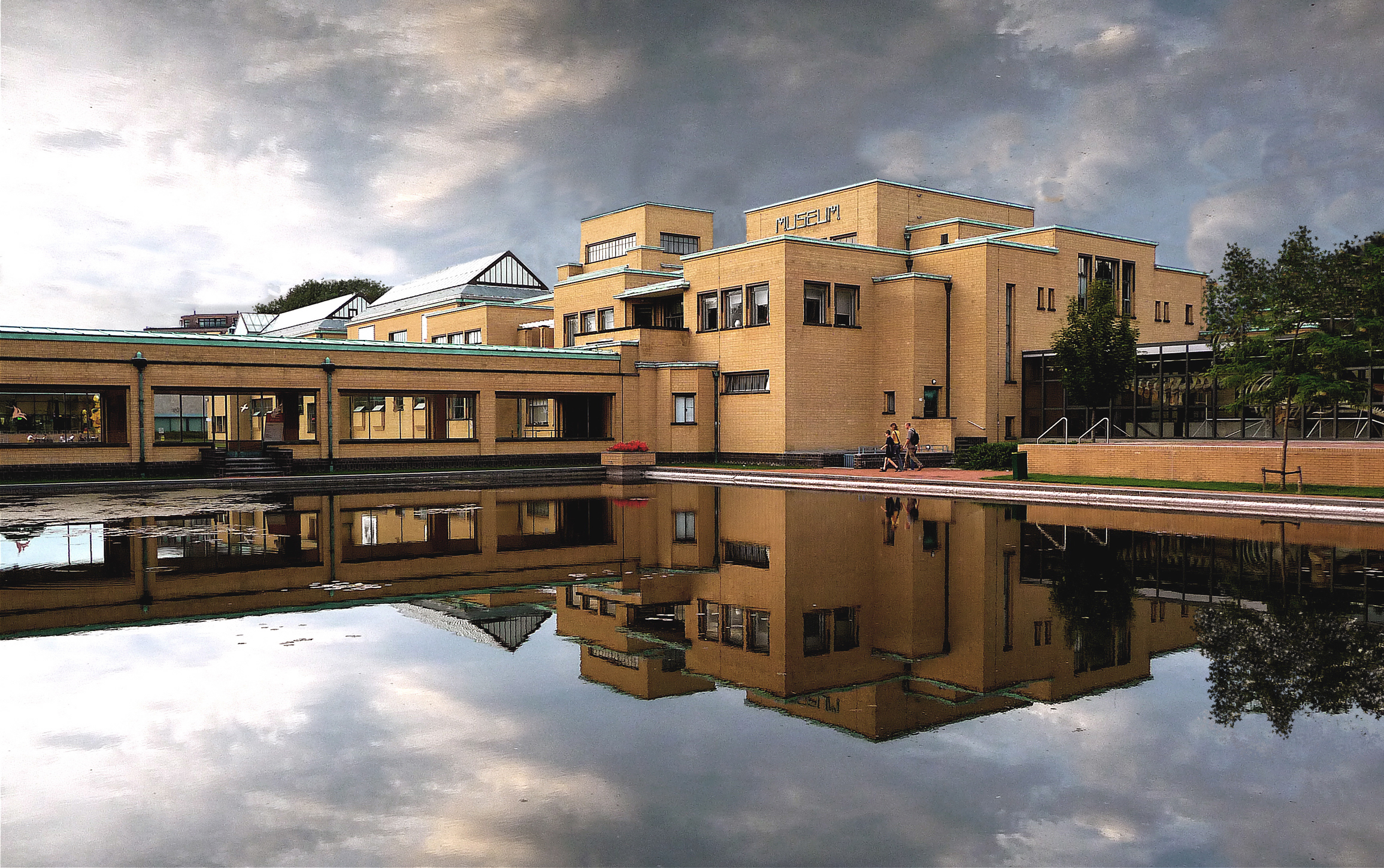
View of the Kunstmuseum Den Haag, designed by H. P. Berlage, and opened in 1935

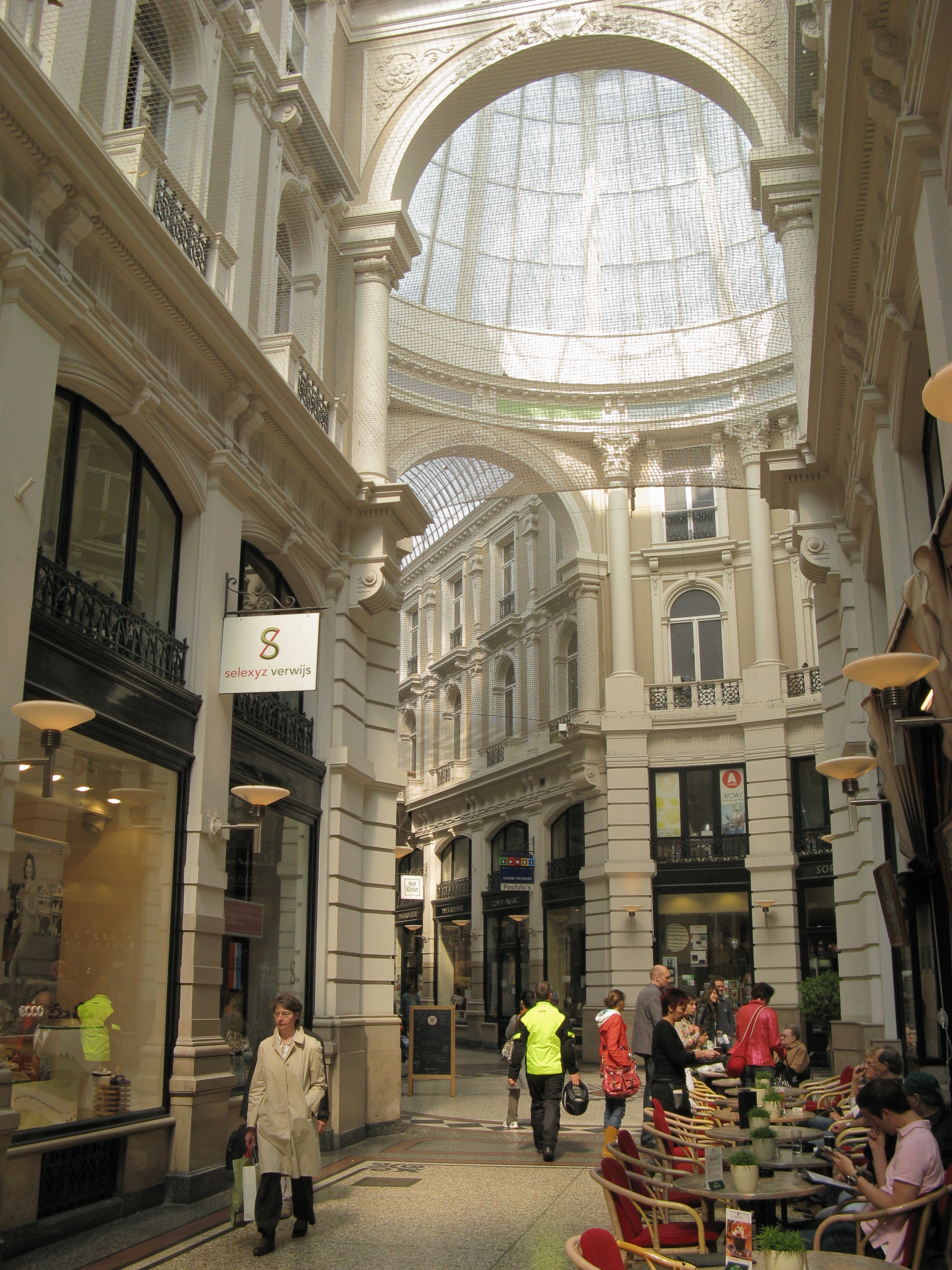
De Passage is the oldest surviving shopping arcade in the Netherlands.

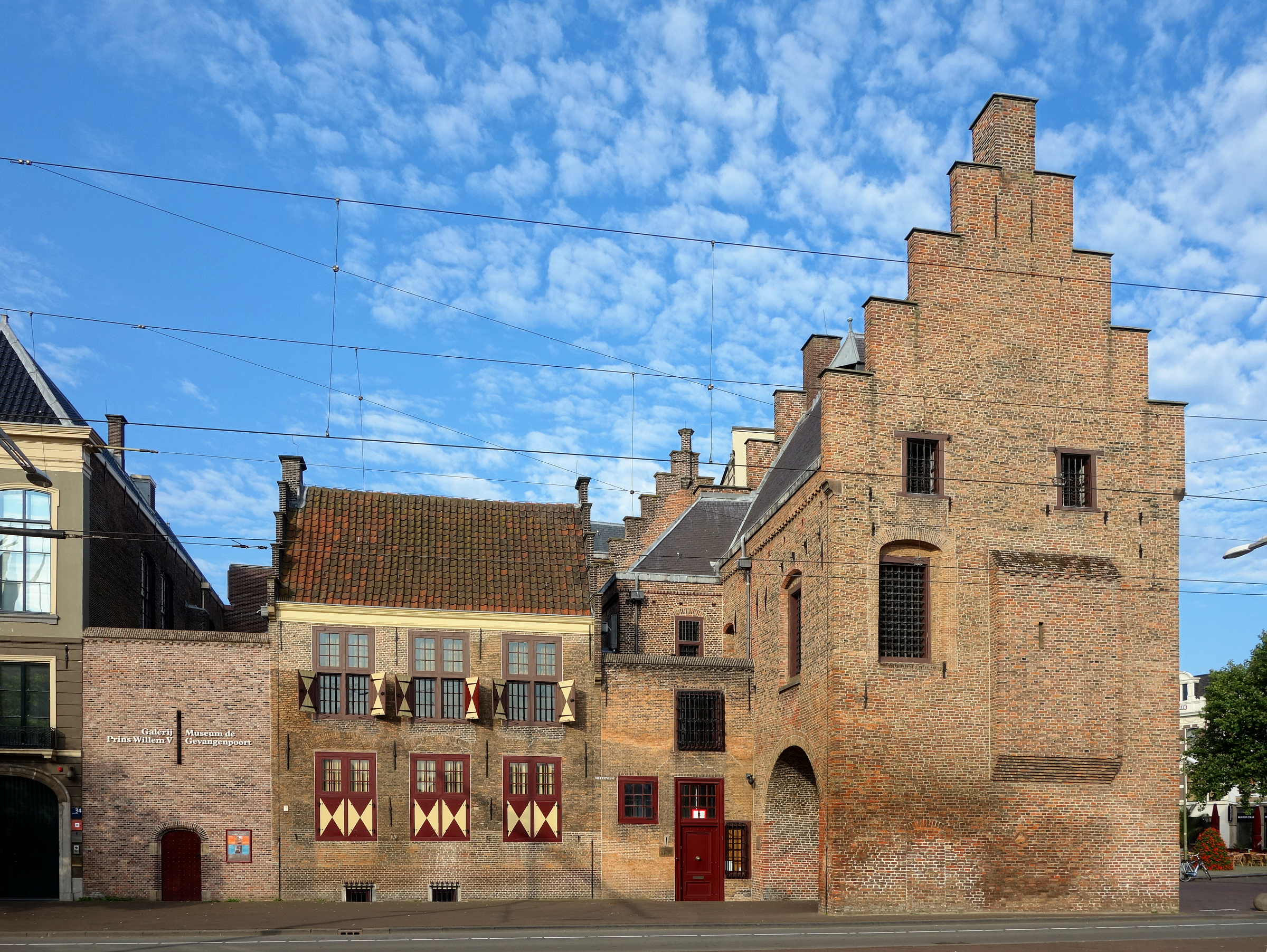
The Gevangenpoort is a medieval prison in The Hague. A museum has been housed in the building since 1882.

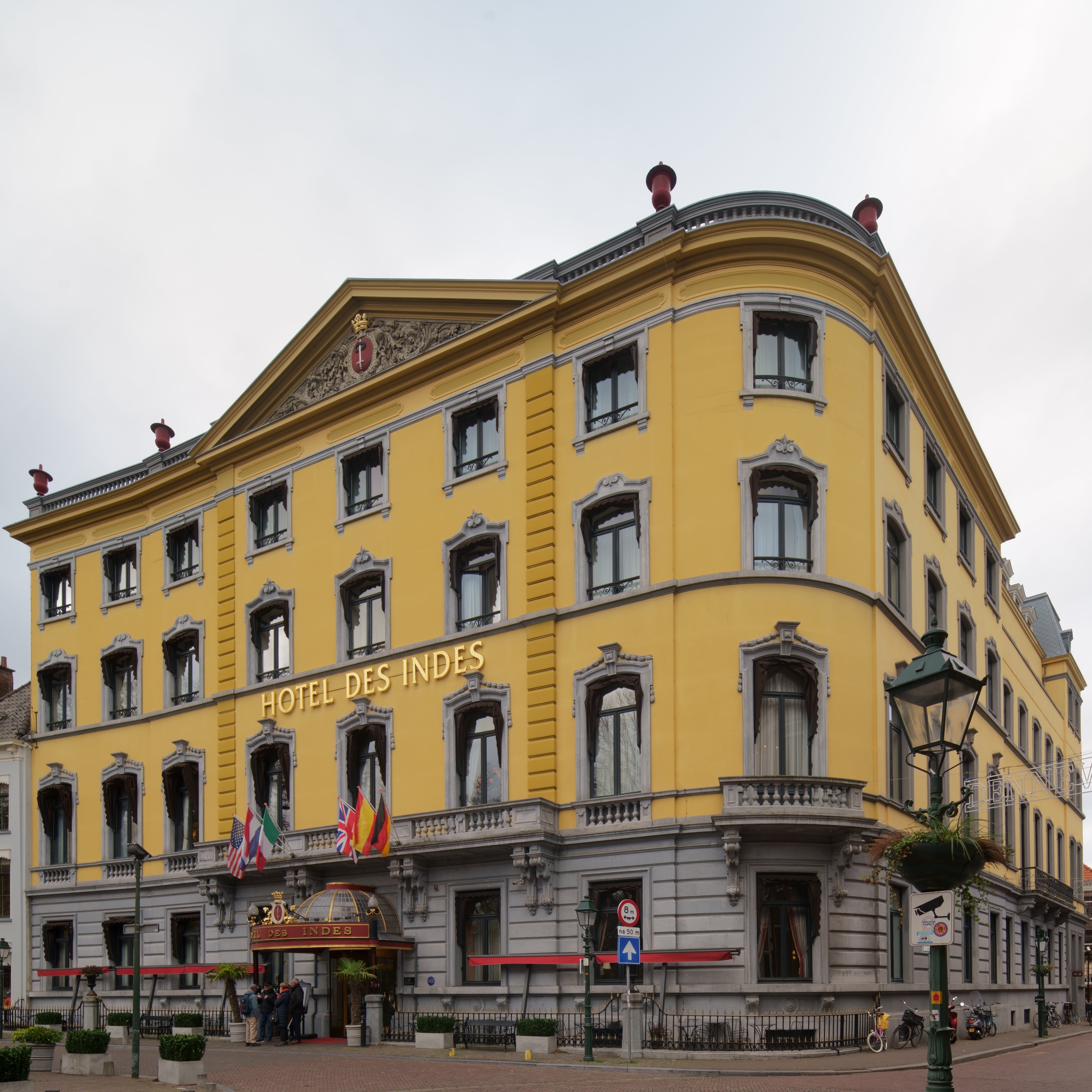
Hotel des Indes (The Hague) is located at the Lange Voorhout.

=== Sports ===
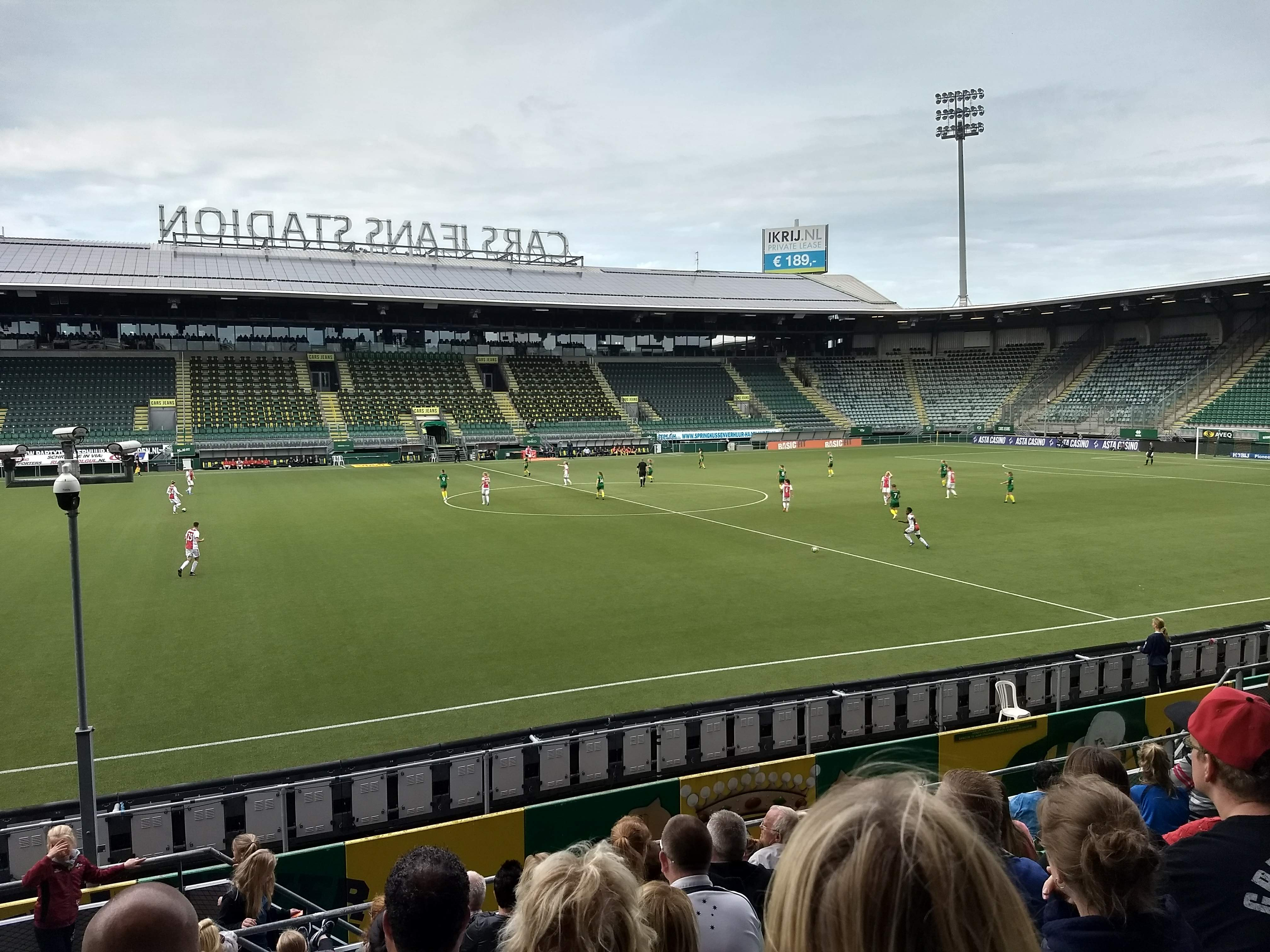
ADO Den Haag Stadium

The city's major football club is ADO Den Haag, which competes in the Eredivisie, the highest tier of football in the Netherlands. ADO Den Haag has won the KNVB Cup twice and won the League twice in the era before professional football. They play their matches at the 15,000-seat ADO Den Haag Stadium. The amateur team HVV is also based in the city. Before the professional era, the club won 10 national titles and one KNVB Cup. They remain fourth in the all-time list of national title winners. HBS Craeyenhout is another amateur club in the city, which won three national titles before the establishment of the Eredivisie. On 13 May 2021, football club ADO Den Haag was relegated from the Eredivisie as they lost their final game of the season against Willem II. In effect, ADO Den Haag no longer holds a position in the top division of professional Dutch football.

Since 2020, the basketball club The Hague Royals has played in the professional Dutch Basketball League (DBL). Home games are played at the Sportcampus Zuiderpark.

The local rugby union team is Haagsche Rugby Club (a.k.a. HRC). The ice hockey team is HYS The Hague, and the local American football team is Den Haag Raiders '99.

Darts is another sport played in The Hague; its popularity was increased by Raymond van Barneveld winning several World Championships.

The half-marathon race CPC Loop Den Haag is held annually in The Hague. In 1994, The Hague held the FEI World Equestrian Games.

=== Annual events ===
Koningsdag, or King's Day, is held annually on 27 April. It is traditionally celebrated with fairs and flea markets throughout the city. On this day, the colour orange predominates at a funfair (which sells orange cotton candy) and scores of informal street markets. The day is a vrijmarkt (literally "free market"), which means no licence is needed for street vending; children traditionally use this day to sell old, unwanted toys. Since King's Day is a national holiday and thus a day off, many people also go out and party on the evening before King's Day. This evening is called King's Night, or Koningnacht in The Hague. The "t" is left out because nacht is pronounced as nach in The Hague. Outdoor concerts throughout the city centre of The Hague draw tens of thousands of visitors every year.

Every third Tuesday in September is Prinsjesdag, or Prince's Day, the opening of the Dutch parliament. On a festive day, children in The Hague are free from school so they may watch the procession of the Golden Coach. The King is driven in the coach from Noordeinde Palace to the Ridderzaal in the Binnenhof. Here, the King reads the Speech from the Throne, written jointly by the Ministers and Secretaries of State. This troonrede outlines the government's plans for the coming year. As the procession returns to the Noordeinde Palace, the road is lined with members of the Dutch Royal Armed Forces, and in the afternoon, the Royal Family appears on the palace balcony to address an adoring and often frenzied public (balkonscène).

Vlaggetjesdag (nl), literally Flag Day, is the annual celebration of the arrival of the year's first herring (Hollandse Nieuwe) in Scheveningen. Hundreds of thousands of people gather in Scheveningen for the festivities, and the fishing boats are decorated specially for the occasion. In addition to the omnipresent herring, this day also features several activities unrelated to fish. In Scheveningen, the first barrel of herring is traditionally sold at an auction on the Thursday preceding the official Vlaggetjesdag, and the proceeds go to charity. Vlaggetjesdag was made official in 1947, although the festive tradition around the beginning of herring season is much older: in the 18th century, the villages along the coast, including Scheveningen, were forbidden to gut the caught herring. Since herring was most appropriate for smoking around September, most fishing boats caught flatfish or round-bodied fish during part of the summer to avoid a surplus of fresh herring. In July or August, The Hague hosts a series of weekly firework displays by the sea front in Scheveningen, as part of an international fireworks festival and competition.

Tong Tong Fair, formerly Pasar Malam Besar, is the largest festival in the world for Indo culture. Established in 1959, it is one of the oldest festivals and the fourth-largest grand fair in the Netherlands. It is also the annual event with the highest number of paying visitors to The Hague, having consistently attracted more than 100,000 visitors since 1993. The Milan Festival is Europe's biggest Hindustani open-air event, annually held in Zuiderpark. The Hague also hosts several annual music festivals; on the last Sunday in June, the city hosts Parkpop, the largest free open-air pop concert in Europe. Crossing Border Festival, State-X and The Hague Jazz festival are among other music festivals in The Hague.

Crossing Border Festival is an annual festival in November, focusing on music and literature. The first edition took place in 1993.

Movies That Matter is an international film and debate festival about peace and justice that takes place every year at the end of March; nine days filled with screenings of fiction films and documentaries, daily talk-shows, music performances, and exhibitions. The first such event took place in 2006.

Moreover, the Hague International Model United Nations, annually held in January, is a five-day conference held at the World Forum, gathering over 4,000 students from over 200 secondary schools across the globe. It is the oldest and largest high school United Nations simulation in the world. Den Haag Sculptuur is an open-air exhibition of sculptures; the tenth such event, in 2007, celebrated the 400 years of the relationship between the Netherlands and Australia. Since 2009, the city of The Hague has also annually presented an LGBTQ+ emancipation award, called the John Blankenstein Award. The exact date of the ceremony varies each year.

== Transport ==
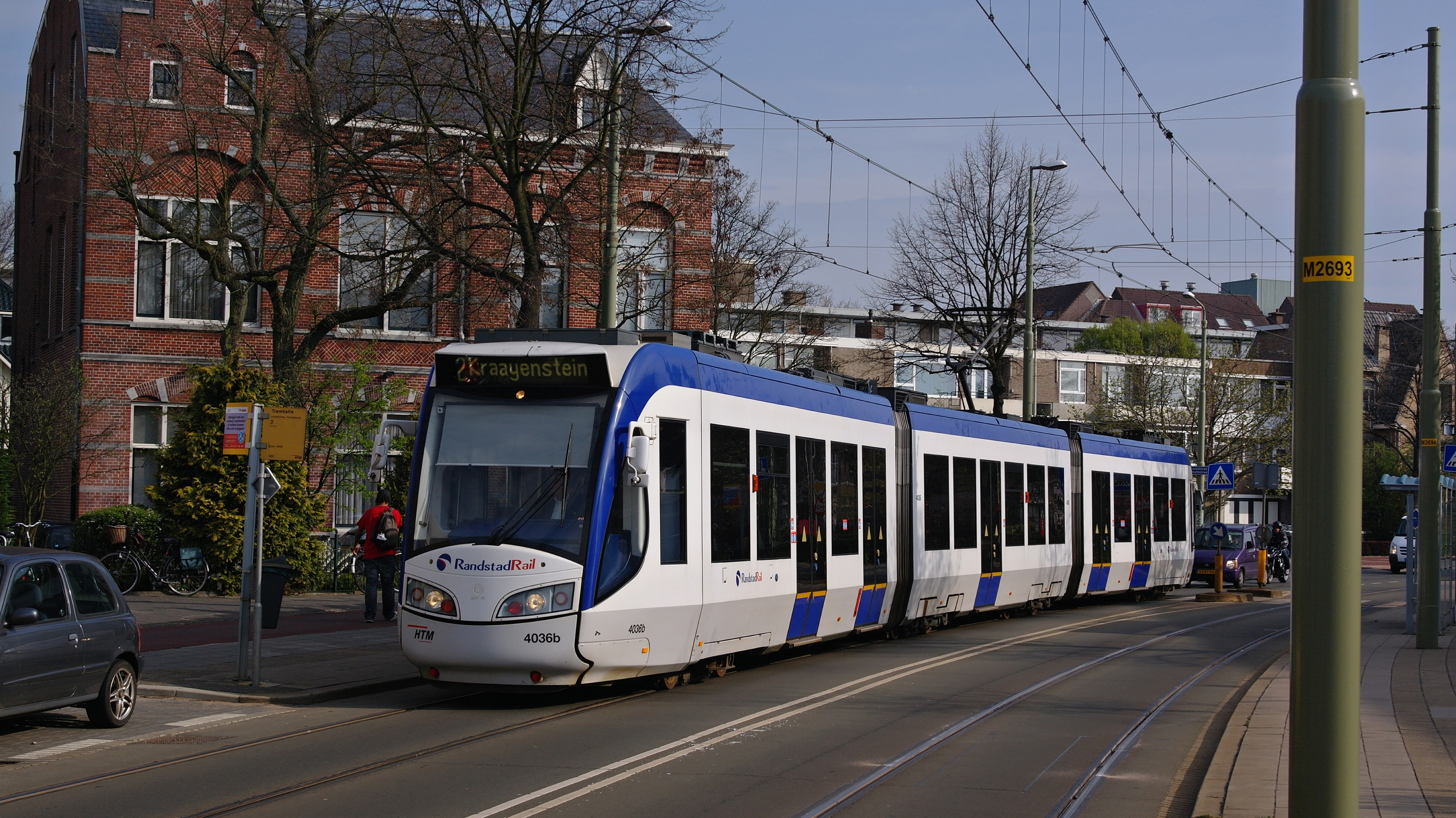
Modern RegioCitadis tram on route 2, Loosduinen, April 2012

=== Air ===
The Hague shares an airport with Rotterdam. It can be reached from Central Station by RandstadRail Line E, with an Airport Shuttle to and from Meijersplein Station. However, with several direct trains per hour from the railway stations Hollands Spoor and Centraal, Amsterdam Airport Schiphol is more frequently used by people travelling to and from The Hague by air.

=== Rail ===
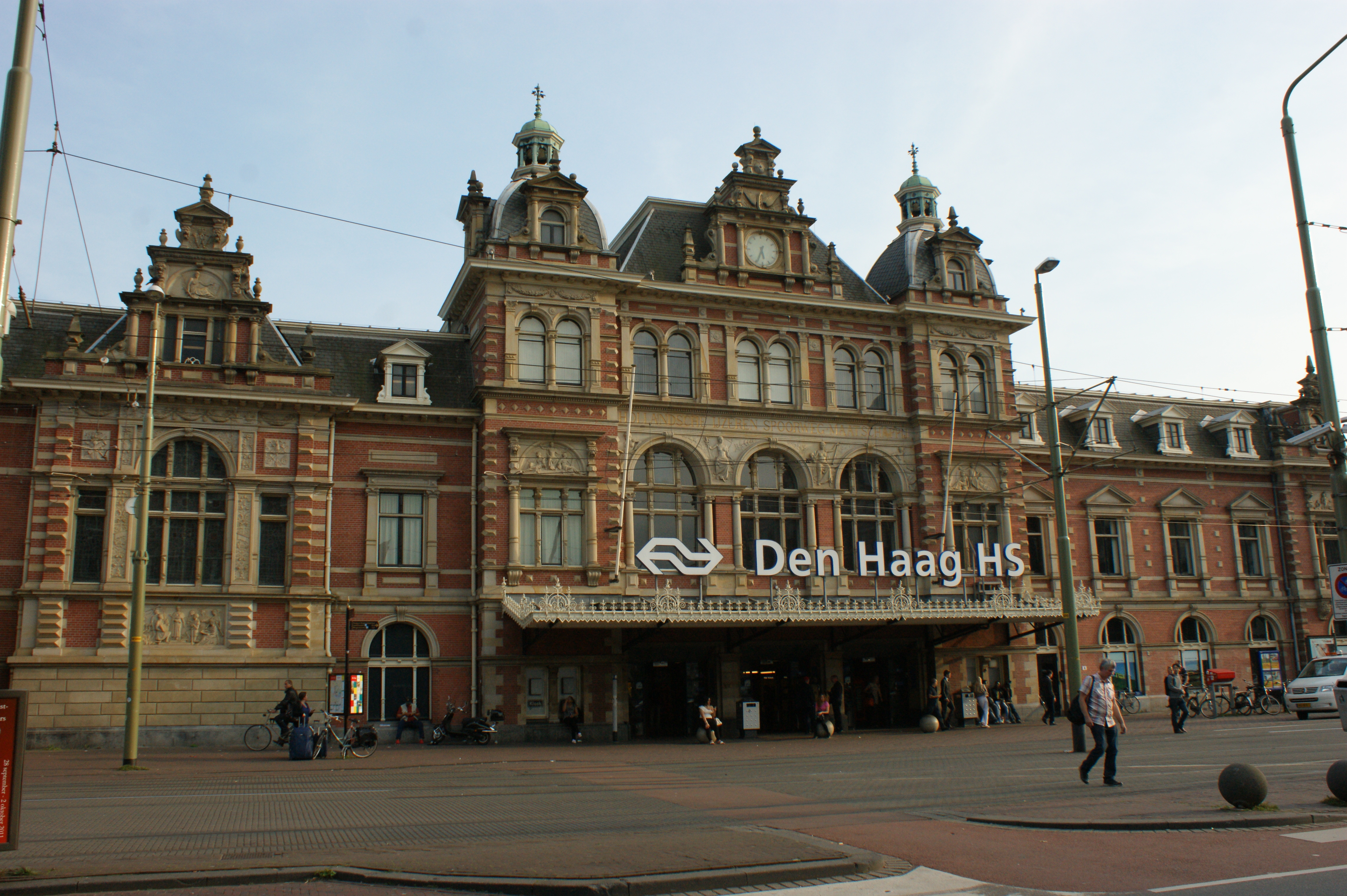
View of Hollands Spoor

There are two main railway stations in The Hague: Hollands Spoor and Centraal Station, 1.5 km (1 mi) apart from each other. Because the two stations were built and run by two different railway companies in the 19th century, services have traditionally been split between the two: east–west lines terminate at Centraal Station, whereas north–south lines run through Hollands Spoor. However, Centraal Station now offers direct services to most major Dutch cities, such as Amsterdam, Rotterdam, and Utrecht.

Other destinations include Leiden, Haarlem, Zwolle, Groningen, Leeuwarden, Amersfoort, Enschede, Breda, Tilburg and Eindhoven. International travellers for Antwerp and Brussels have to change trains at Rotterdam.

=== Urban transport ===
Public transport in The Hague consists of a tramway network and a sizeable number of bus routes, operated by HTM Personenvervoer. Plans for a subway were shelved in the early 1970s. However, in 2004, a tunnel was built under the city centre with two underground tram stations (Spui and Grote Markt); it is shared by RandstadRail lines 3 and 4 and tram routes 2 and 6.

RandstadRail connects The Hague to nearby cities, Zoetermeer, Rotterdam, and Leidschendam-Voorburg. It consists of four light rail lines (3, 4, and 19 to Zoetermeer, Rijswijk, Delft, and Leidschendam-Voorburg) and one subway line (E to Rotterdam).

=== Road ===
Major motorways connecting to The Hague include the A12, running to Utrecht and the German border. The A12 runs directly into the heart of the city in a cutting. Built in the 1970s, this section of the motorway (the "Utrechtsebaan") is now heavily overburdened. Plans were made in the late 1990s for a second artery road into the city (the "Rotterdamsebaan", previously called the "Trekvliettracé"), which was completed in 2021. Other connecting motorways are the A4, which connects the city with Amsterdam, and the A13, which runs to Rotterdam and connects to motorways towards the Belgian border. There is also the A44 that connects the city to Leiden, Haarlem and Amsterdam. In the 1970s, plans for building another motorway to Leiden existed. This "Leidsebaan" was supposed to start in the city centre and then follow the railway line from The Hague to Amsterdam. Some works had been executed but had been removed by the 1980s.

== See also ==
- List of people from The Hague
