= Orange Hotel =

Orange Hotel may refer to:

- Oranjehotel (literally "Orange Hotel"), colloquial name of Hague Penitentiary Institution in Scheveningen
- Orange Hotel, one of brands of H World Group Limited
