= List of international trips made by Willy Brandt =

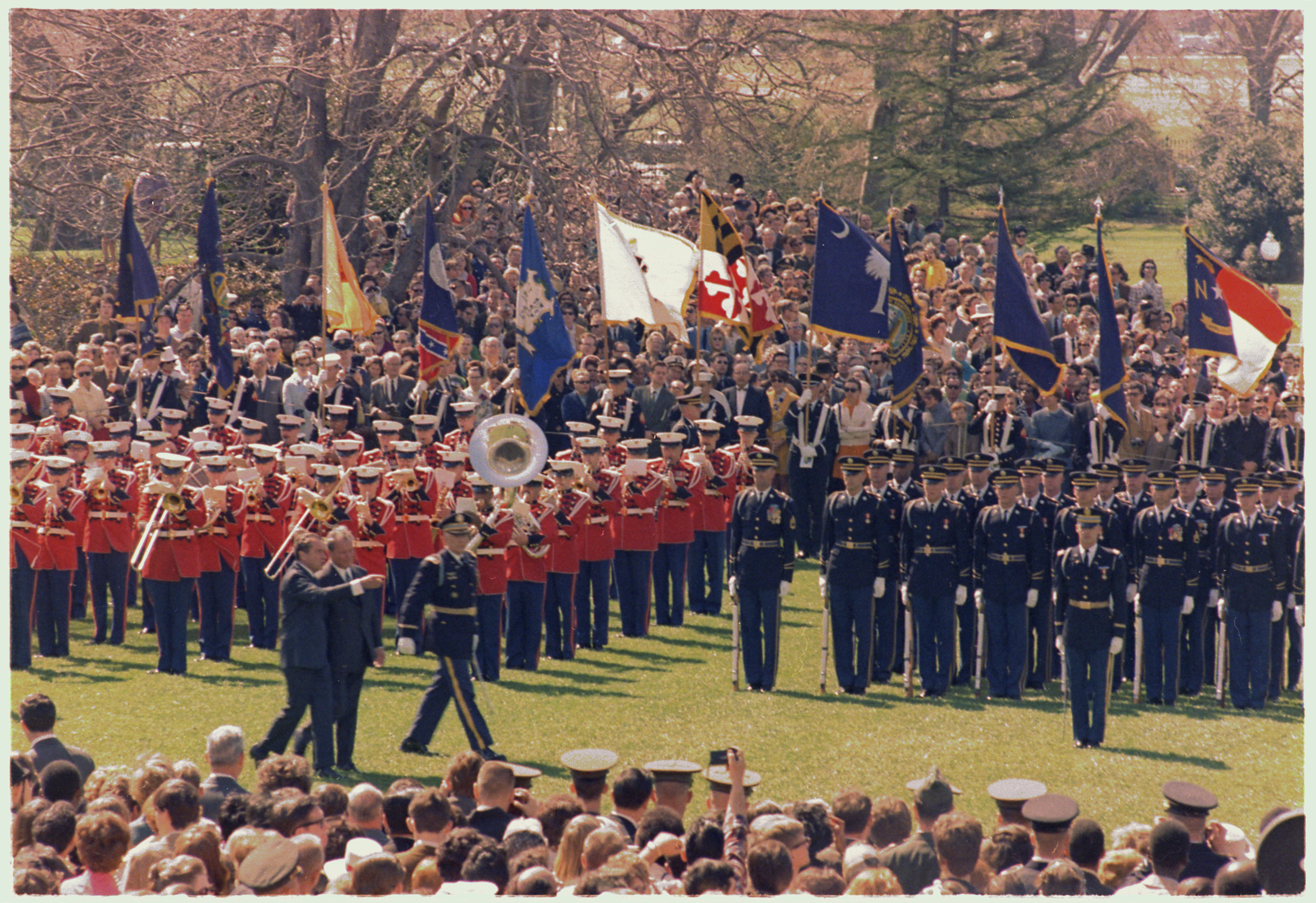
The United States Marine Band performing during a State Arrival Ceremony for Chancellor Brandt on the South Lawn of the White House, 1970.

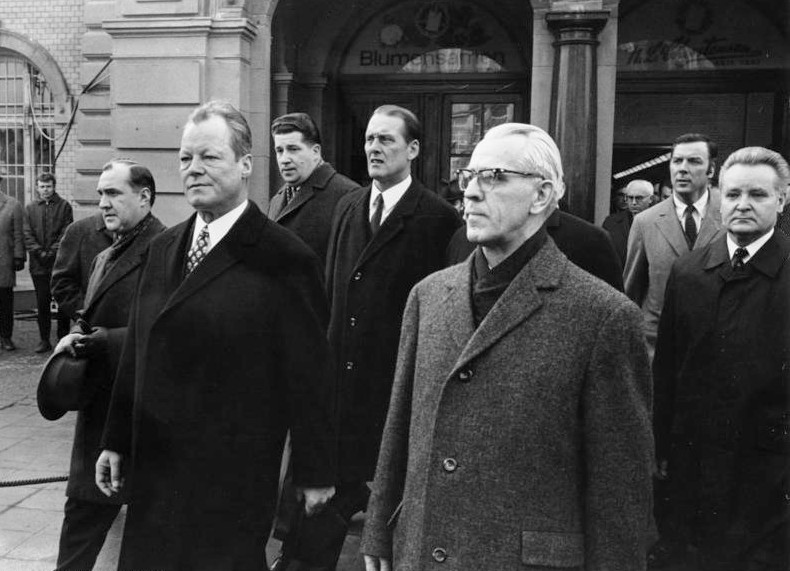
Willy Brandt (left) and Willi Stoph in Erfurt 1970, the first encounter of a Federal Chancellor with his East German counterpart.

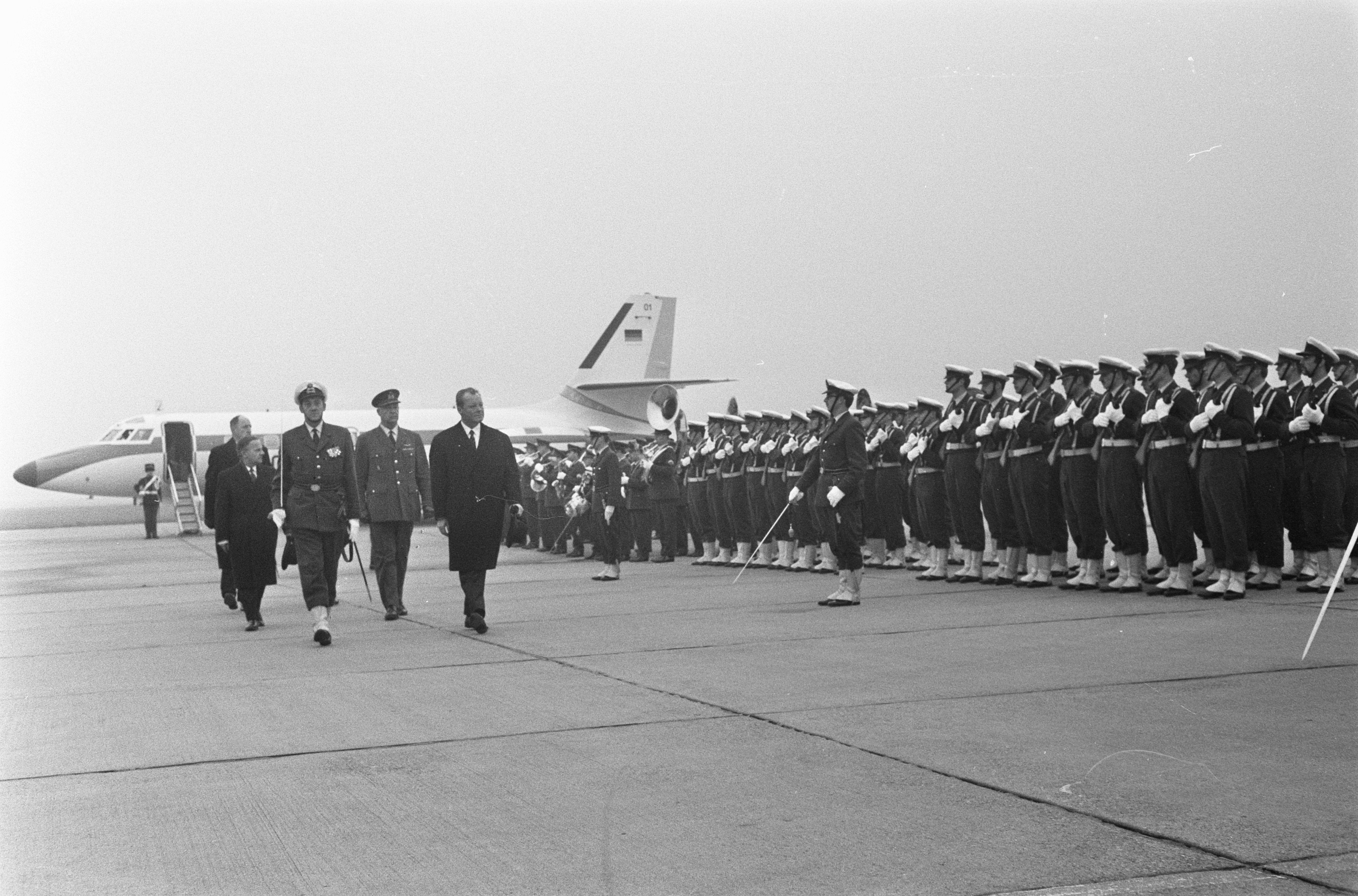
Brant inspecting a Dutch Armed Forces guard of honour at Ypenburg Airport in December 1969.

This is a list of international trips made by Willy Brandt, the 4th Chancellor of West Germany, during his tenure from 21 October 1969 to 7 May 1974.

== Summary of international trips ==
=== 1969 ===
Country	Areas visited	Date(s)	Details
Netherlands	The Hague	1 December	March

=== 1970 ===
Country	Areas visited	Date(s)	Details
Tunisia	Tunis	8–9 January	
France	Paris	30–31 January	
Denmark	Copenhagen	14 February	
United Kingdom	London	2–4 March	
East Germany	Erfurt	19 March	Visited the Buchenwald concentration camp
United States	El Paso; Cape Kennedy	4–11 April	
Norway	Oslo	23–25 April	
Vatican		12–24 July	
Soviet Union	Moscow	11–13 August	
Italy	Rome	23–25 November	
Poland	Warsaw	6–8 December	Visit became known for the Kniefall von Warschau and the signing of an agreement recognizing the Polish borders

=== 1971 ===
Country	Areas visited	Date(s)	Details
France	Paris	25–26 January	
United Kingdom	London	5 May	
Jamaica	Kingston	12–13 June	
United States	Hartford, Connecticut	13–18 June	
Soviet Union	Crimea	16–18 September	
Norway	Oslo	9–11 December	
Sweden	Stockholm	11–12 December	
United States	Key Biscayne, Florida	28–29 December	

=== 1972 ===
Country	Areas visited	Date(s)	Details
France	Versailles	10–11 February	
Iran	Teheran; Isfahan; Kharg Island	5–8 March	
United Kingdom	London	20–22 April	
Austria	Vienna; Eisenstadt	23–25 May	
France	Paris	19 October	

=== 1973 ===
Country	Areas visited	Date(s)	Details
France	Paris	22–23 January	
Belgium	Brussels	7 February	
Yugoslavia	Belgrade; Brijuni	16–19 April	
United States	Washington, D.C.	29 April – 3 May	
Israel	Lod; Jerusalem; Herzliya	7–11 June	
United States	New York City; Chicago	23 September – 1 October	
France	Strasbourg	12–13 November	
Czechoslovakia	Prague	11–12 December	
Denmark	Copenhagen	14–15 December	

=== 1974 ===
Country	Areas visited	Date(s)	Details
France	Paris	6 April	Funeral of Georges Pompidou
Algeria	Algiers	19–21 April	
Egypt	Cairo	21–24 April	
