= Zorgvliet =

Coordinates: 52.0886°N 4.2858°E

- Neighbourhood of The Hague
- Location of Zorgvliet in The Hague
- Country: Netherlands
- Province: South Holland
- Municipality: The Hague
- District: Scheveningen

Area
  - Total: 87.6 ha (216 acres)
  - Land: 84.9 ha (210 acres)

Population (2025)
  - Total: 708

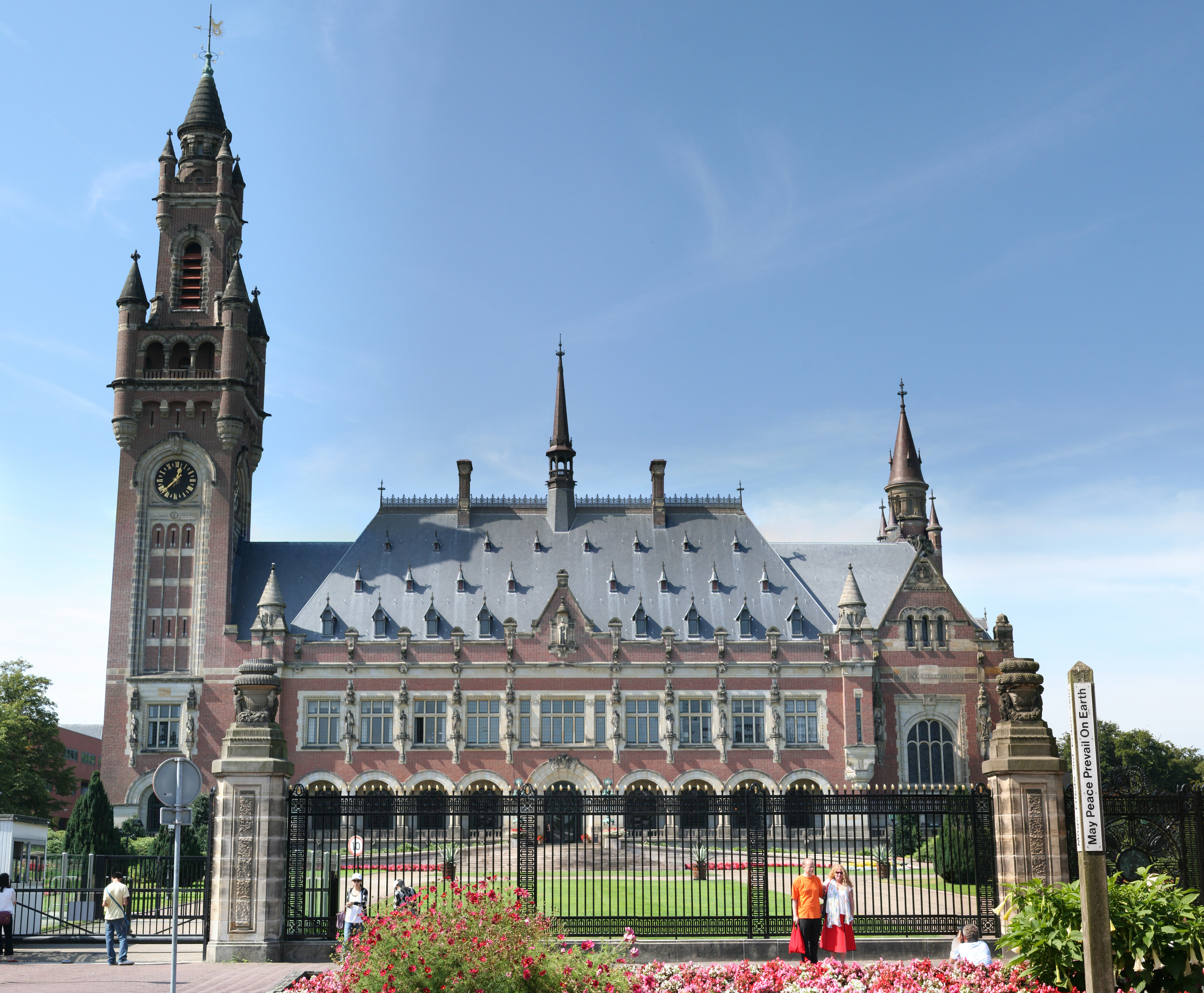
The Peace Palace.

Zorgvliet (Dutch pronunciation: [ˈzɔr(ə)xflit]) is a neighbourhood in the Scheveningen district of The Hague, Netherlands. It is named after the estate of the same name, once owned by the poet and writer Jacob Cats, (since then called the Catshuis), later by 18th century politician Willem Bentinck van Rhoon and later again becoming the official residence of the Dutch Prime Minister. It has 377 inhabitants (as of 1 January 2013) and covers an area of 876 hectares (3.38 sq mi). It is bordered by the Laan van Meerdervoort, the Groot Hertoginnelaan, the Stadhouderslaan, the Stadhoudersplantsoen and the Eisenhowerlaan. Zorgvliet is the location of The Hague's "international zone", which is home to the International Criminal Tribunal for the former Yugoslavia, the Organisation for the Prohibition of Chemical Weapons, Europol and the World Forum Convention Center. The Peace Palace, housing the Permanent Court of Arbitration and the International Court of Justice, is also located in Zorgvliet. Moreover, Zorgvliet is the location of the Museum Mesdag, Gemeentemuseum Den Haag and Museon.
