= Belgisch Park =

Neighbourhood in The Hague, Netherlands

Coordinates: 52.109°N 4.293°E

- Neighbourhood of The Hague
- The location of Belgisch Park in The Hague
- Country: Netherlands
- Province: South Holland
- Municipality: The Hague
- District: Scheveningen

Area
  - Total: 97.3 ha (240 acres)
  - Land: 97.0 ha (240 acres)

Population (2025)
  - Total: 8,367

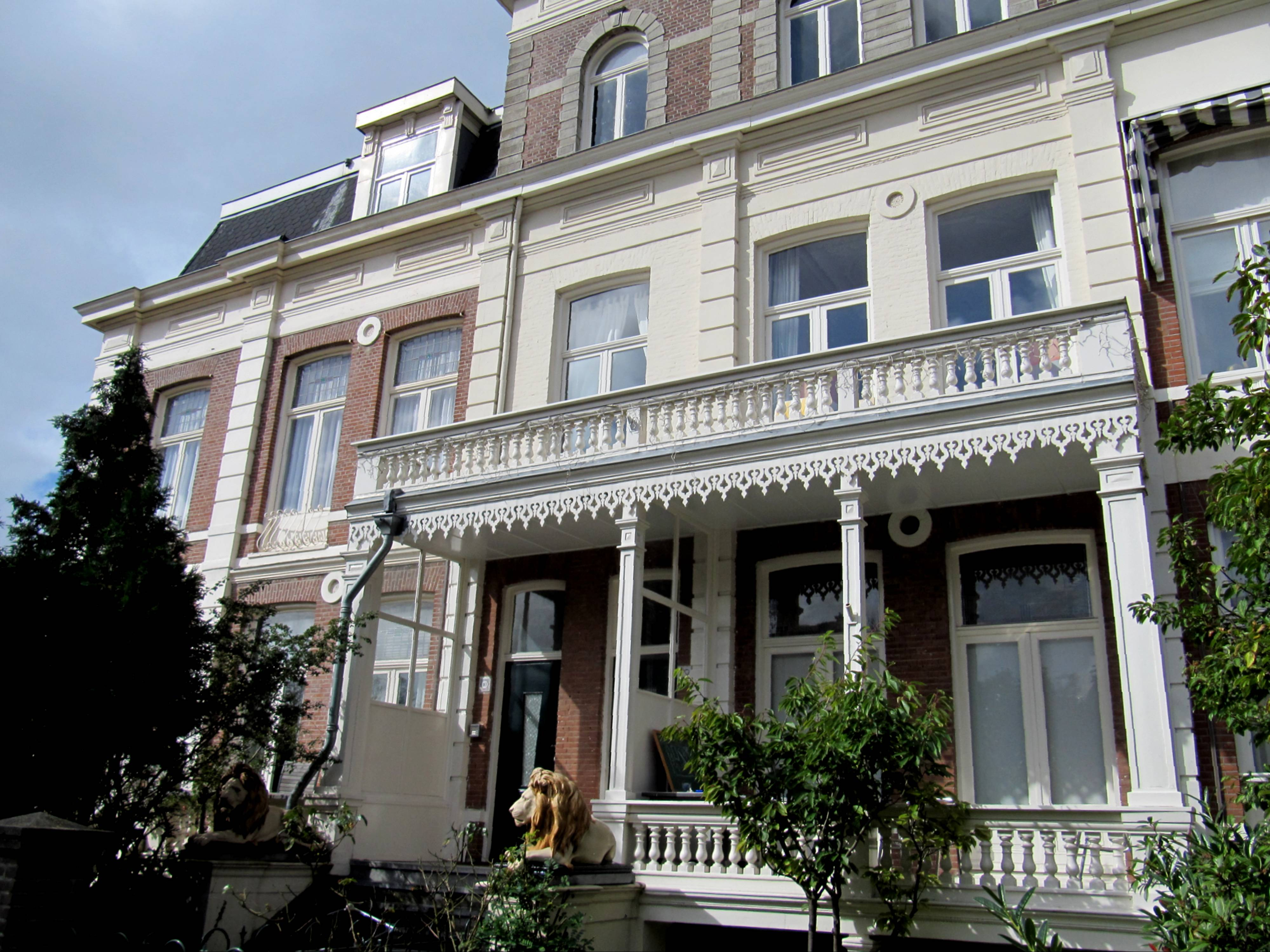
Residential house, Antwerpsestraat.

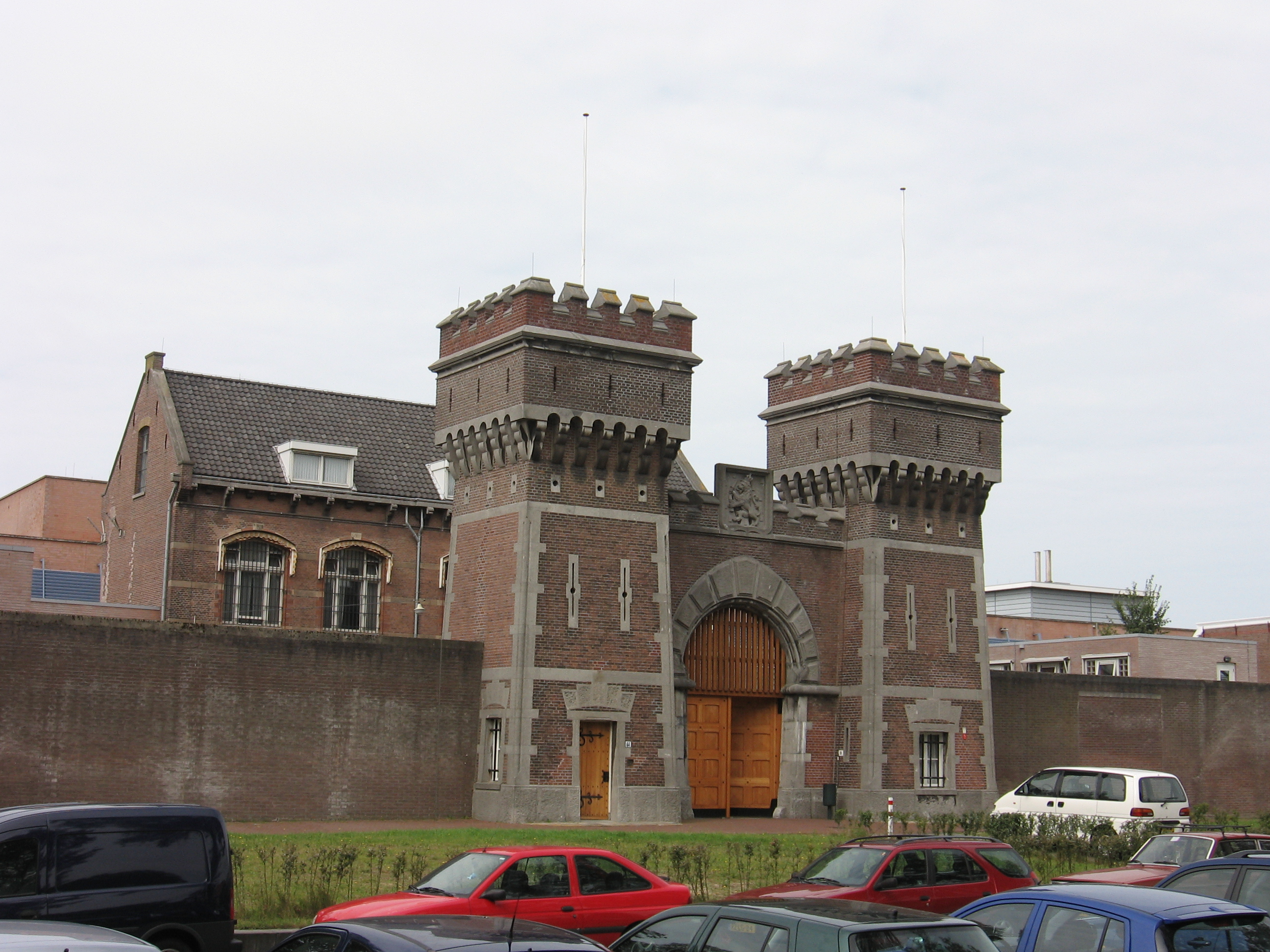
Entrance to Penitentiary.

Belgisch Park (Dutch pronunciation: [ˈbɛlɣis ˌpɑr(ə)k]; lit. 'Belgian Park') is a neighbourhood in the Scheveningen district of The Hague, Netherlands. The area has around 7,900 residents and contains many trees and the adjoining “Nieuwe Scheveningse Bosjes” and “Oostduinen”. The buildings date from the period 1870–1940. Many of the houses are expensive private residences.

In the east is location Scheveningen of the Hague Penitentiary Institution (Penitentiaire Inrichting Haaglanden), located at the road Pompstationsweg. On its premises is also the ICC Detention Centre for the detention of people awaiting trial before the International Criminal Court and the UN Detention Unit for the detention of people awaiting trial before the International Criminal Tribunal for the former Yugoslavia. The former Liberian president Charles Taylor, who is on trial before the Special Court for Sierra Leone is also held there; the trial location is that of the International Criminal Court, as decided in United Nations Security Council Resolution 1688 of 17 June 2006.
