= United Nations Detention Unit =

UN-administered prison in the Netherlands

Coordinates: 52.1092°N 4.3014°E

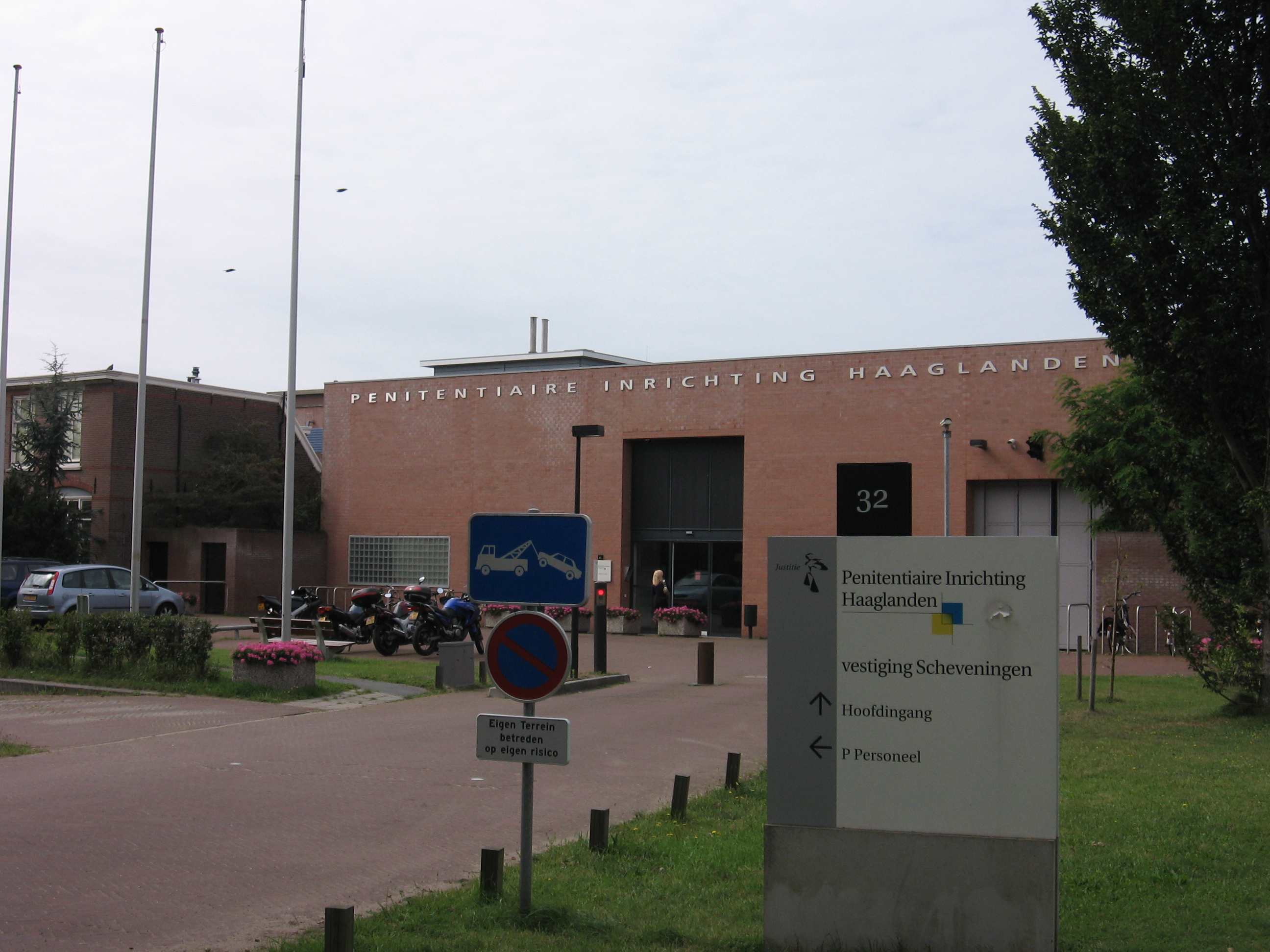
- Main entrance to the Hague Penitentiary Institution at the Scheveningen location
- Interactive map of United Nations Detention Unit
- Location: Scheveningen, The Hague, Netherlands
- Opened: 1993
- Managed by: United Nations

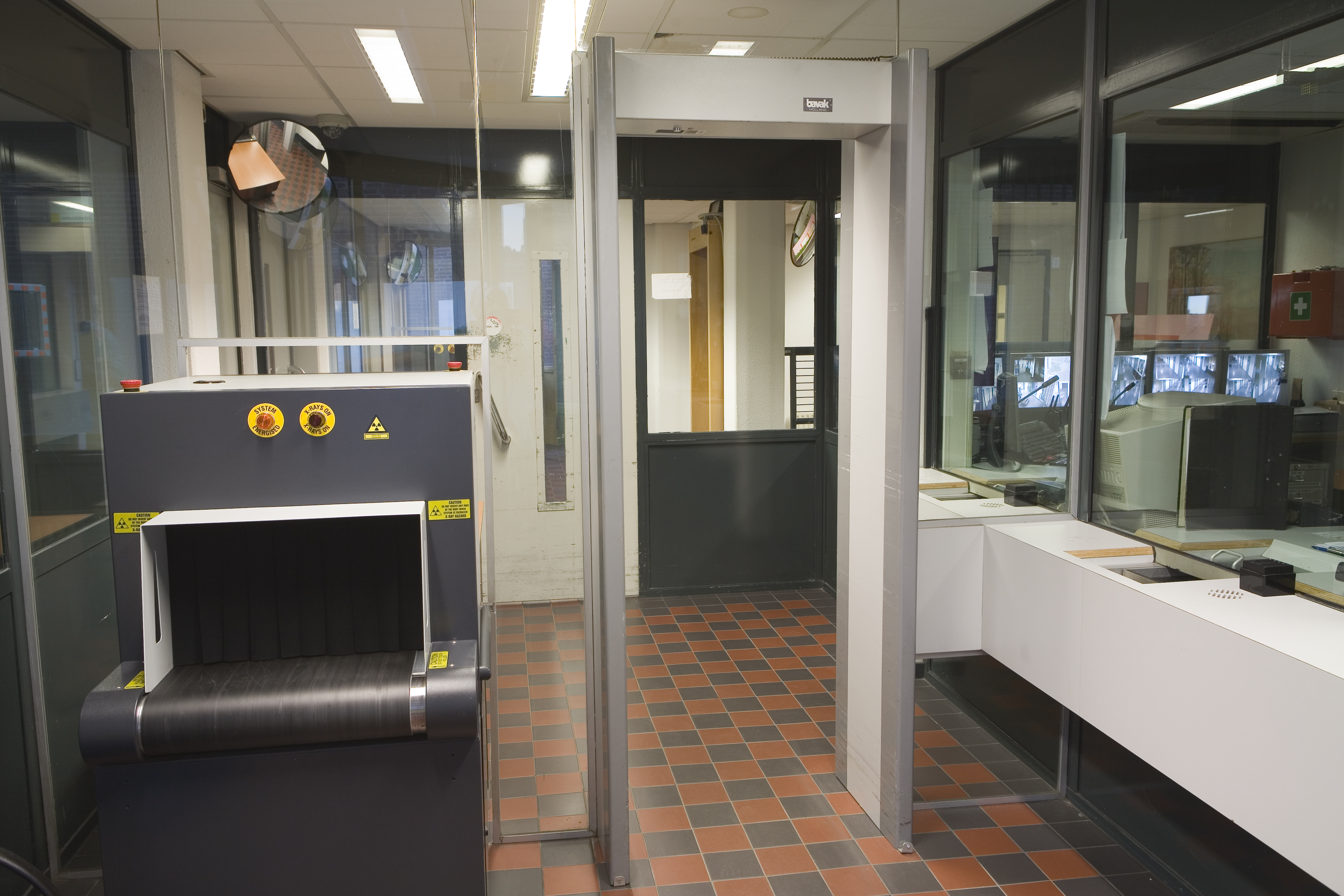
Security area at the entrance at the Scheveningen location

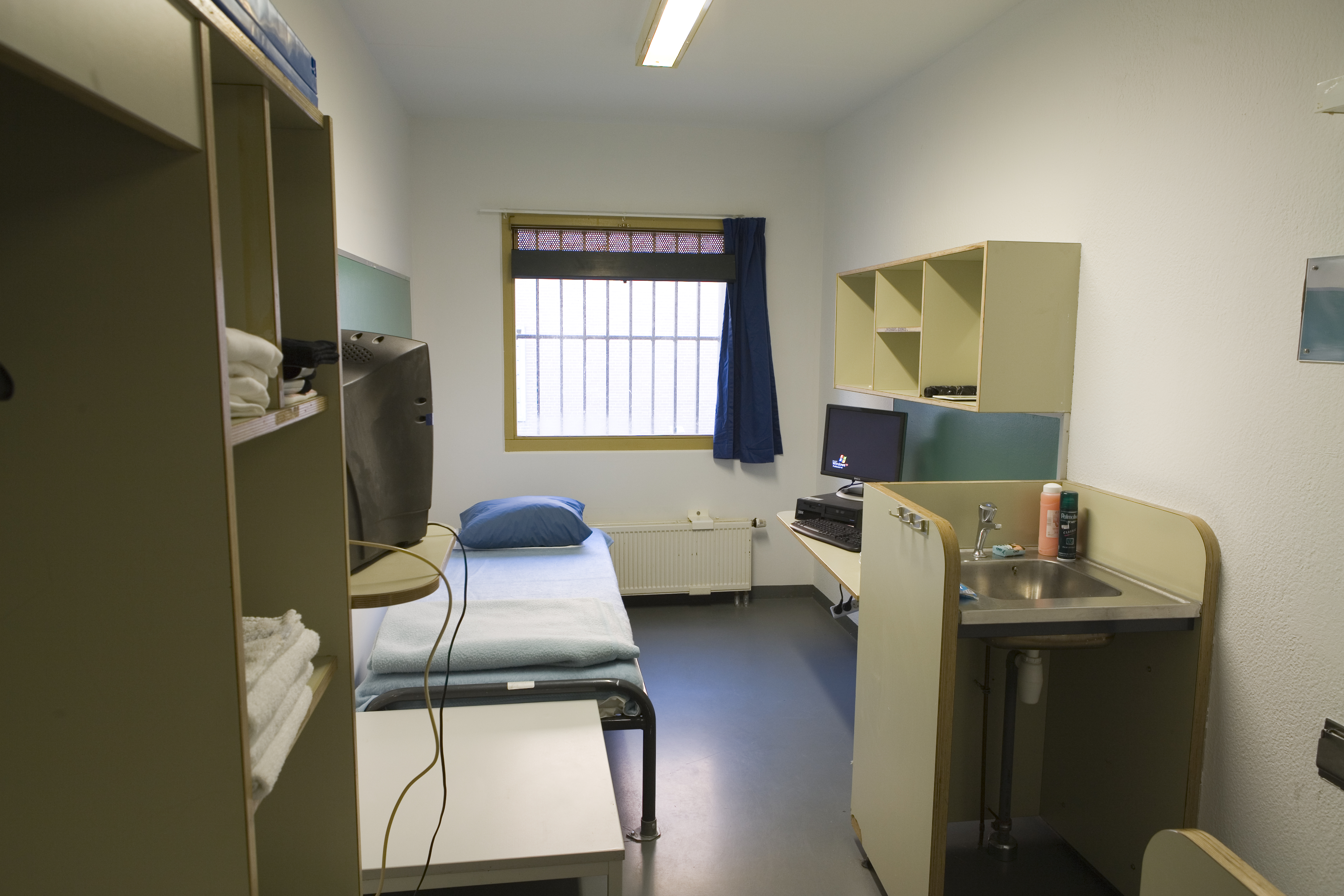
A typical 10 m^{2} (110 sq ft) single cell at the ICTY detention facilities

The United Nations Detention Unit (UNDU) is a United Nations–administered jail. It is part of the Hague Penitentiary Institution's Scheveningen location, more popularly known as Scheveningen Prison, in The Hague, Netherlands. The UNDU was established in 1993 as part of the International Criminal Tribunal for the former Yugoslavia (ICTY) and currently houses detainees whose cases have been taken over by the International Residual Mechanism for Criminal Tribunals (IRMCT).

The penitentiary also hosts the ICC Detention Centre for the detention of people awaiting trial before the International Criminal Court. The penitentiary was picked as a trial location for the International Criminal Court, through United Nations Security Council Resolution 1688 of 17 June 2006.

Its current and former inmates include Slobodan Milošević, Radovan Karadžić and Rodrigo Duterte. Former Liberian president Charles Taylor, who was on trial before the Special Court for Sierra Leone, was also held in the penitentiary until his transfer to a UK prison in 2013.

== The Yugoslavia Tribunal ==
The mass atrocities committed first in Croatia and later in Bosnia and Herzegovina spurred the international community into action. As early as September 1991, the United Nations took note of the situation and urged parties to the conflict to abide by international law. Thousands were injured and killed and hundreds of thousands were displaced. On 25 May 1993, the UN Security Council passed resolution 827 formally establishing the International Criminal Tribunal for the former Yugoslavia, known as the ICTY. This was the first war crimes court established by the UN and the first international war crimes tribunal since the Nuremberg and Tokyo tribunals.

The unit runs a comprehensive program of remand which has a full daily schedule providing for fresh air, exercise, medical care, occupational therapy, spiritual guidance, conditions suitable for the preparation of defence, IT facilities and training, visiting and recreational and sport activities. The detainees also have access to satellite TV stations and press from their homeland.

The UN Detention Unit has a medical facility, staffed with a medical officer and an assistant. It is designed to provide detainees with basic healthcare and emergency services. This is especially important considering that the average age of detainees is relatively high and that most of them arrive to the UNDU with various health problems. As of 11 May 2012, the average age of detainees was 59.6 years. The high medical service standards result in the health of many detainees improving while they are incarcerated. The unit is subject to frequent independent inspections by external agencies such as the International Committee of the Red Cross.

The first person accommodated in the unit was Duško Tadić in April 1995. Since then, more than 180 individuals have been held for different periods of time, of this number 141 were accused of war crimes by ICTY, 36 were detained witnesses, and 13 were accused or convicted of contempt of court. Amongst them were Slobodan Milošević, who was found dead in his prison cell on 11 March 2006, and Radovan Karadžić. The unit has the current capacity to hold up to 52 detainees, each having full access to all facilities.

Convicted Yugoslavian war criminals do not serve their sentence in the UNDU, but are transferred to a prison outside of the Netherlands to serve their sentence.

== International Criminal Court ==
Starting June 2006, the UNDU in The Hague also serves as the International Criminal Court's (ICC) detention centre. The ICC started functioning in 2002 and has the jurisdiction to prosecute individuals for the international crimes of genocide, crimes against humanity, and war crimes. The UNDU houses both those detained suspects during their trial as those convicted by the court and serving prison sentences. Suspects held by the ICC and the ICTY are held in the same prison and share some facilities, like the fitness room, but have no contact with each other.

The ICC registrar is responsible for managing the ICC detention centre. The rules governing detainment are contained in Chapter 6 of the Regulations of the Court and Chapter 5 of the Regulations of the Registry. The International Committee of the Red Cross (ICRC) has unrestricted access to the ICC detention centre.

Each individual has their own toilet and washing area. Each has access to a small gym and is offered training with a physical education instructor. Detainees are provided with meals, but they may also cook for themselves, purchase food from the prison shop, and have ingredients ordered in. Each detainee has a personal computer in his cell, on which they can view material related to their case. They are offered computer training, if required, and language courses.

Detainees are allowed to communicate in private with their defence teams and diplomatic representatives of their countries of origin. They are permitted visits from family members, spouses and partners, and spiritual advisors.

Former Liberian president Charles Taylor, who was on trial before the Special Court for Sierra Leone, was held in the penitentiary. Other detainees held in the ICC Detention Centre included Thomas Lubanga Dyilo, Germain Katanga, Jean-Pierre Bemba, Laurent Gbagbo, Bosco Ntaganda, Charles Blé Goudé, Dominic Ongwen, Ahmad al-Faqi al-Mahdi, Rodrigo Duterte amongst others.

== See also ==
- United Nations Detention Facility (Tanzania)
