= Districts of The Hague =

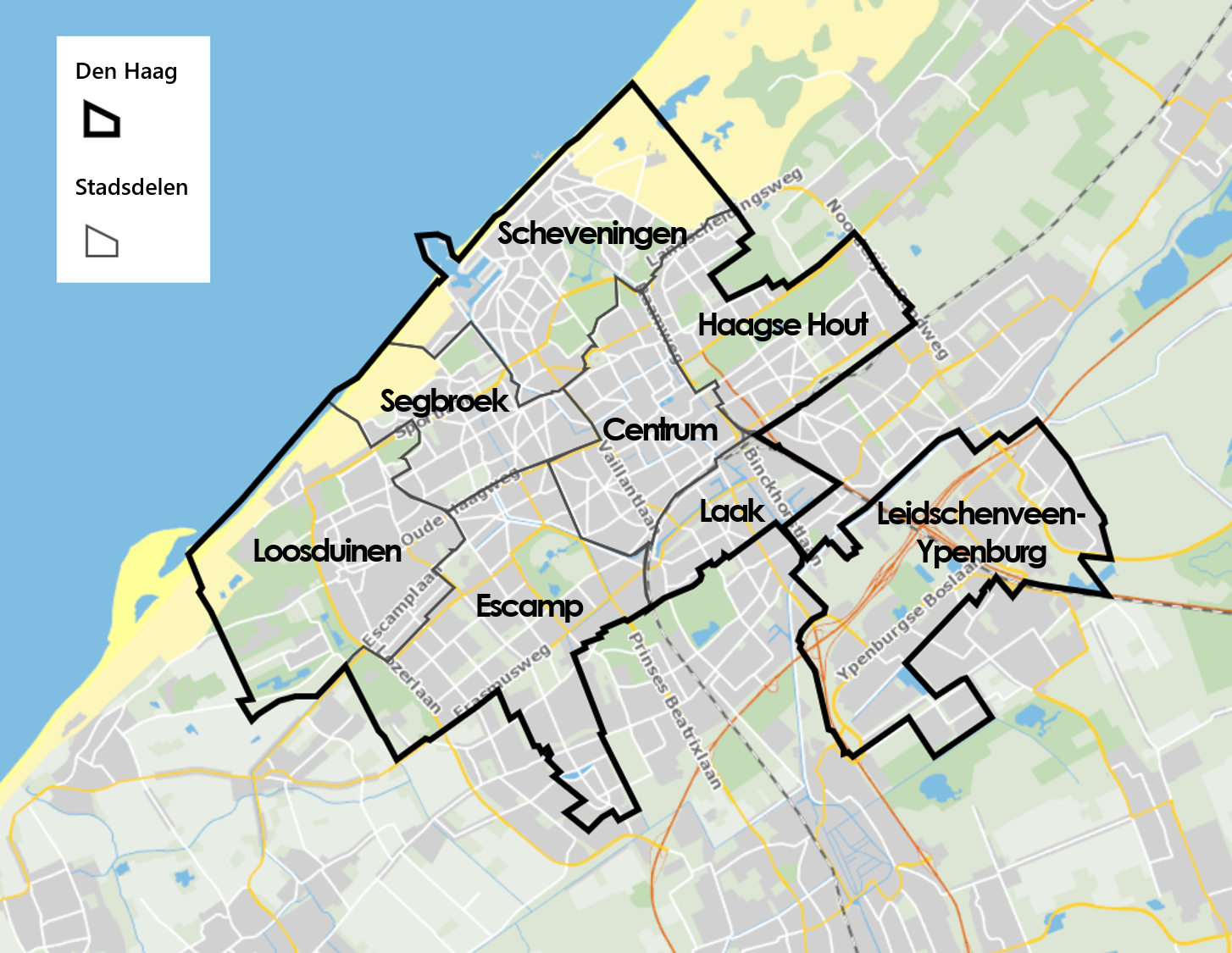

The city of The Hague, Netherlands, consists of eight districts (stadsdelen, singular stadsdeel), similar to boroughs. Each district is divided into subdistricts (wijken). Each of these stadsdelen has its own district office (stadsdeelkantoor), where most of the local government activity is organised. These stadsdeelkantoren make many aspects of local government more accessible to residents. The current division of The Hague into individual stadsdelen was created in 1988 by the main city government. This division of The Hague into wijken (subdistricts) and buurten (neighbourhoods) deviates from the 1953 divisions that had been known to many residents.

== List of districts ==
District	Population (Note: As of 1 January 2024)	Total area (Note: In hectares.)	Land area	Density (Note: In persons per hectare of land area, as of 1 January 2024.)	Subdistricts
Loosduinen	53,691	1,413.5	1,324.6	40.4	5 subdistricts: Bohemen, Meer en Bos; Kijkduin en Ockenburgh; Kraayenstein en Vroondaal; Loosduinen; Waldeck
Escamp	132,119	1,443.9	1,354.2	97.7	7 subdistricts: Rustenburg en Oostbroek; Leyenburg; Bouwlust/Vrederust; Morgenstond; Zuiderpark; Moerwijk; Wateringse Veld
Segbroek	63,341	719.0	705.3	90.0	5 subdistricts: Bomen- en Bloemenbuurt; Vogelwijk; Vruchtenbuurt; Valkenboskwartier; Regentessekwartier
Scheveningen	61,053	1,318.6	1,239.8	49.2	9 subdistricts: Oostduinen; Belgisch Park; Westbroekpark/Duttendel; Van Stolkpark en Schev. Bos; Scheveningen; Duindorp; Geuzen- en Statenkwartier; Zorgvliet; Duinoord
Centrum	110,510	779.3	762.0	145.2	8 subdistricts: Archipelbuurt; Zeeheldenkwartier; Willemspark; Centrum; Stationsbuurt; Schildersbuurt; Transvaalkwartier; Groente- en Fruitmarkt
Laak	46,915	426.2	399.4	117.7	2 subdistricts: Laakkwartier en Spoorwijk; Binckhorst
Haagse Hout	50,878	903.9	869.4	58.6	4 subdistricts: Benoordenhout; Haagse Bos; Mariahoeve; Bezuidenhout
Leidschenveen-Ypenburg	48,224	1,561.0	1,416.6	34.3	4 subdistricts: Hoornwijck; Ypenburg; Forepark; Leidschenveen

== See also ==
- Boroughs of Amsterdam
