= Hague Penitentiary Institution =

Dutch prison

Coordinates: 52°6′35.45″N 4°18′5.17″E

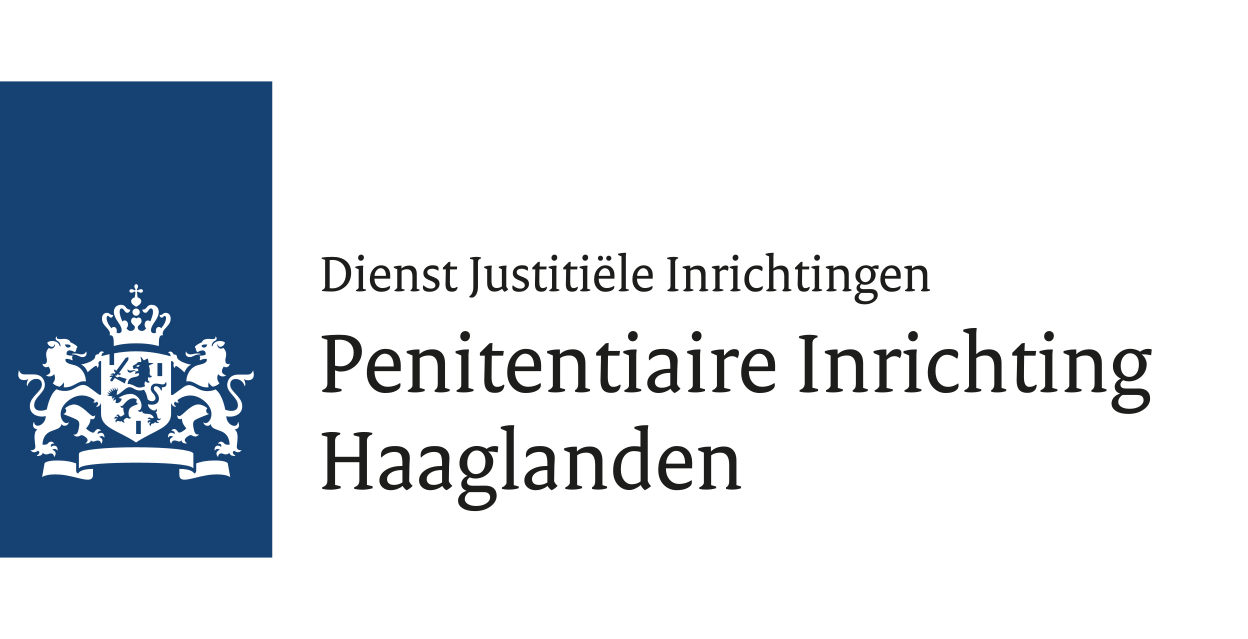
Logo of the Penitentiary Institution Haaglanden

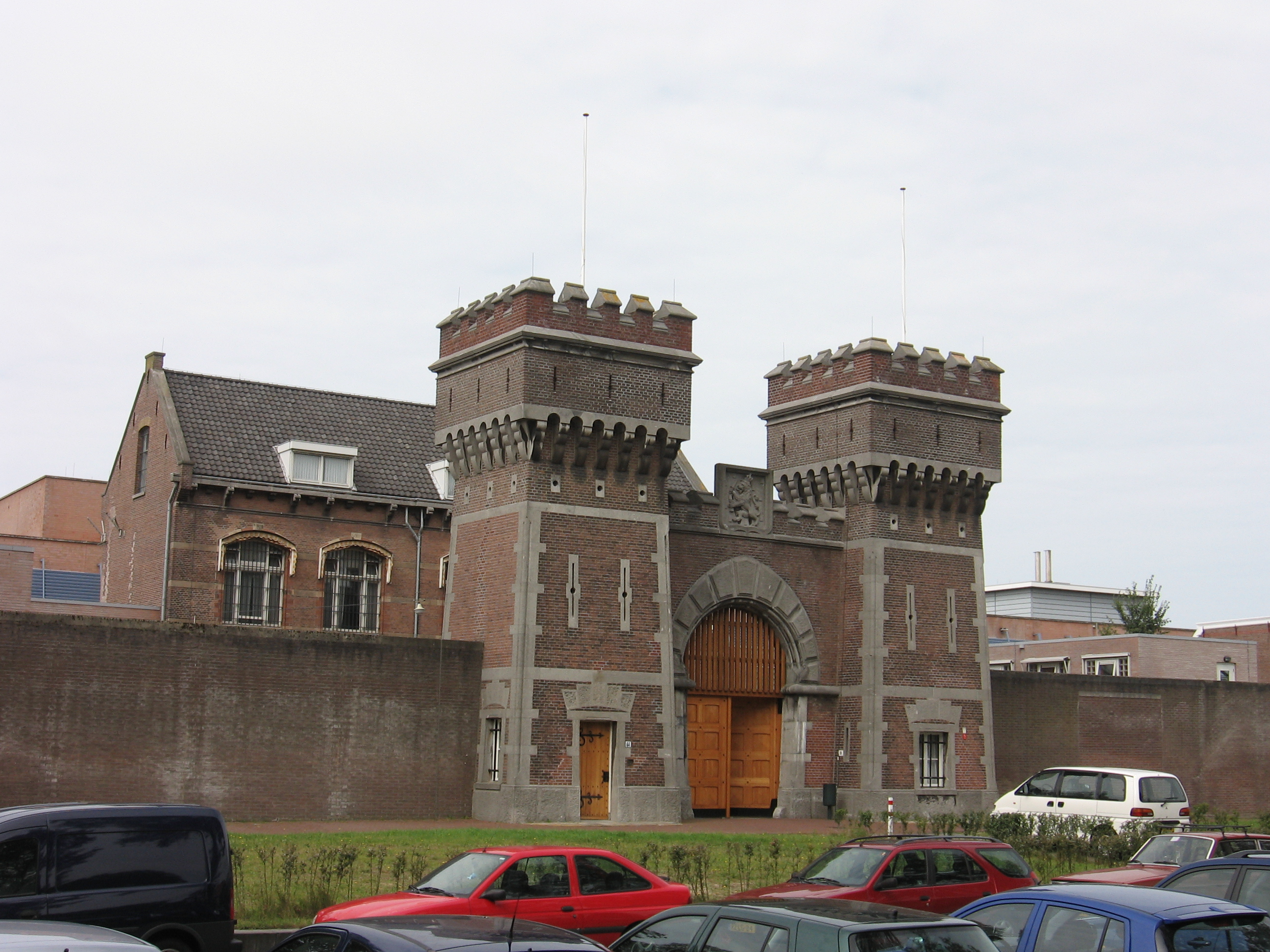
The Penitentiary Institution Haaglanden's Scheveningen location.

The Hague Penitentiary Institution (Dutch: Penitentiaire Inrichting Haaglanden) is a Dutch prison that is part of the Judicial Institutions Department (Dienst Justitiële Inrichtingen, DJI) of the Ministry of Justice. It can accommodate more than 1,000 detainees and consists of two locations, at Zoetermeer and Scheveningen. The Zoetermeer location is for Systematic offenders and the Scheveningen location serves as a Penitentiary Psychiatric Center, the 'open design' Limited Secured Installation and Judicial Medical Center. A special independent unit in the Scheveningen location serves as a United Nations Detention Unit (UNDU) for international offenders where they remain in pre-trial detention under the responsibility of the United Nations like suspects of the International Criminal Tribunal for the former Yugoslavia (ICTY) and of the International Criminal Court (ICC).

== Zoetermeer location ==
The Zoetermeer location of the Hague Penitentiary Institution was built in 1995 and is located in the Rokkenhage district of Zoetermeer, a city in western Netherlands, in the province of South Holland. The penal institution in Zoetermeer is a detention center and an Institution for Systematic offenders (ISD). The location has capacity for nearly 400 detainees.

== Scheveningen location ==
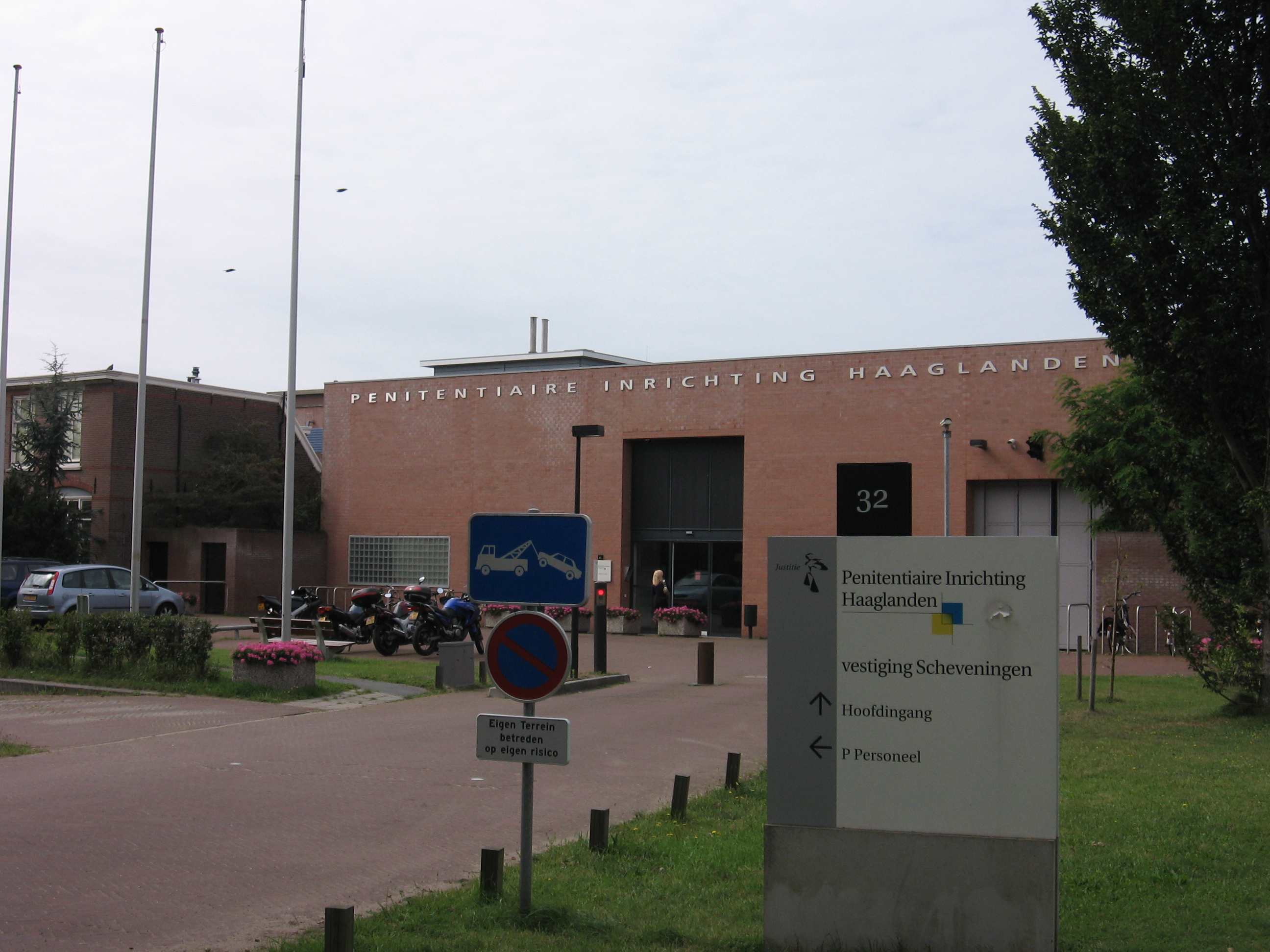
Main entrance to the Hague Penitentiary Institution at the Scheveningen location

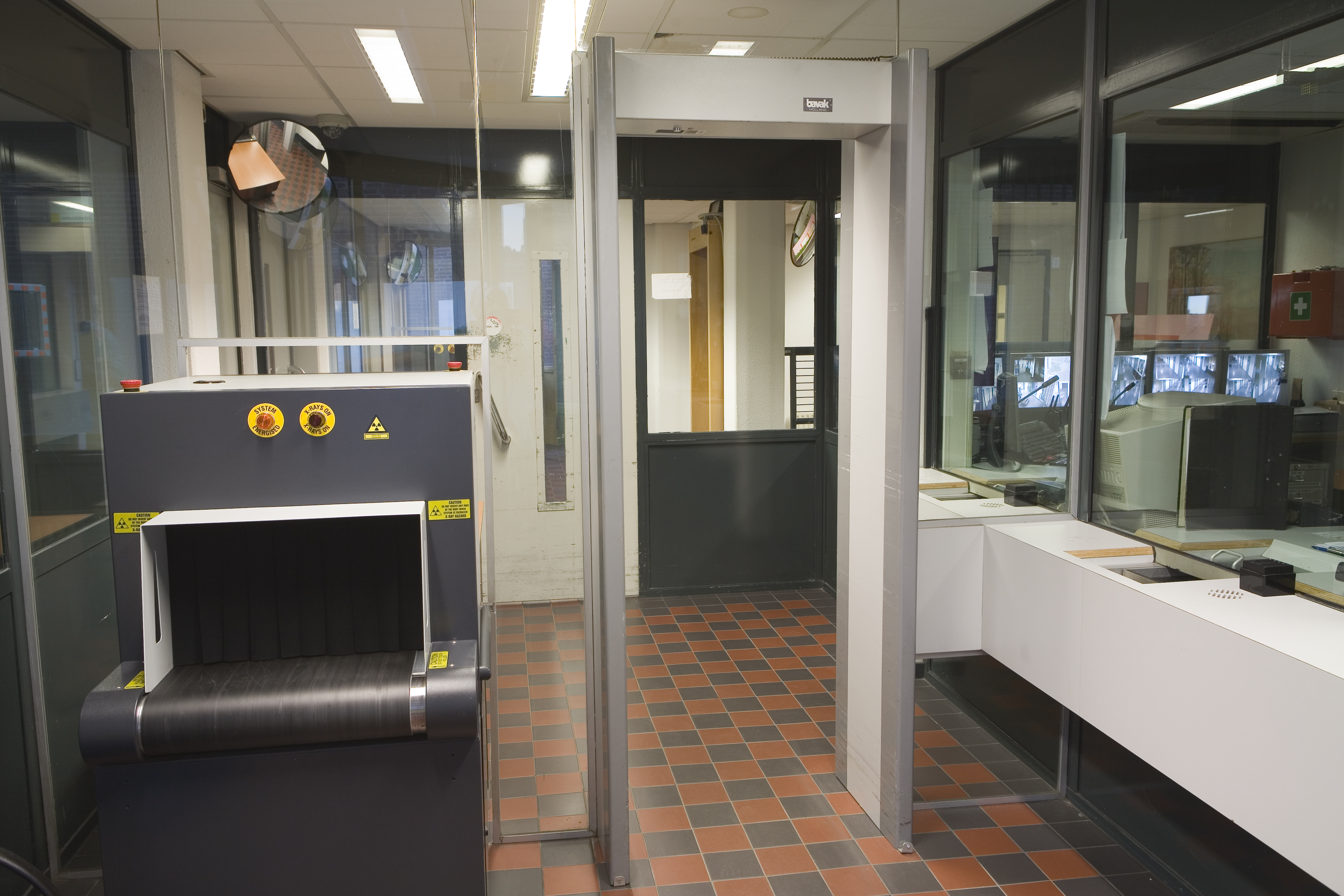
Security area at the entrance at the Scheveningen location

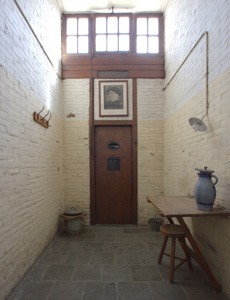
Cell 601, the death cell during World War II

The Scheveningen location of the Hague Penitentiary Institution more popularly known as Scheveningen Prison is a famous prison in Belgisch Park, a neighbourhood in the Scheveningen district of The Hague, Netherlands. The penitentiary in the east section of Scheveningen is located at the road Pompstationsweg.

The complex Scheveningen includes a Penitentiary Psychiatric Center, Limited Secured Installation (also called 'open design') and the Justice Center for Somatic Care (formerly the Penitentiary Hospital or Judicial Medical Center).

=== United Nations Detention Unit ===
A special independently acting unit in the penitentiary's Scheveningen location hosts the United Nations Detention Unit (UNDU), a UN-administered jail as part of the facility. The UNDU was established in 1993 as part of the International Criminal Tribunal for the former Yugoslavia (ICTY) and the ICC Detention Centre for the detention of people awaiting trial before the International Criminal Court. The penitentiary was picked as a trial location for the International Criminal Court, through United Nations Security Council Resolution 1688 of 17 June 2006.

=== Oranjehotel ===
The Scheveningen prison was built in 1919 to house minor criminals. During World War II the prison was confiscated by the Germans and renamed Polizeigefängnis, but was colloquially known as Oranjehotel. More than 25,000 passed through the prison, the vast majority being Jews, resistance fighters, and political prisoners. Most went on to German prisons and concentration camps. 215 prisoners were executed at the Waalsdorpervlakte, the dunes opposite the prison.

The complex became an active prison again after the liberation. However, cell 601, one of the cells for people condemned to death, was kept in its historic condition. The original buildings were decommissioned in 2009, and were designated a national monument in 2010. About two-thirds of the complex was torn down, much to the dismay of the Oranjehotel Foundation.
