= Forepark =

Business park in The Hague, Netherlands

- Interactive map of Forepark
- Location: The Hauge, Netherlands
- Coordinates: 52.065°N 4.393333°E
- Opening date: 1990s
- Owner: Leidschenveen-Ypenburg
- Size: 2.95 km^{2}
- Public transit: Metro Network (Forepark RandstadRail station) and busses
- Website: forepark.nl

Forepark is a Dutch business park in The Hague, Netherlands, east of the Prins Clausplein highway interchange (A4 and A12).

== History ==
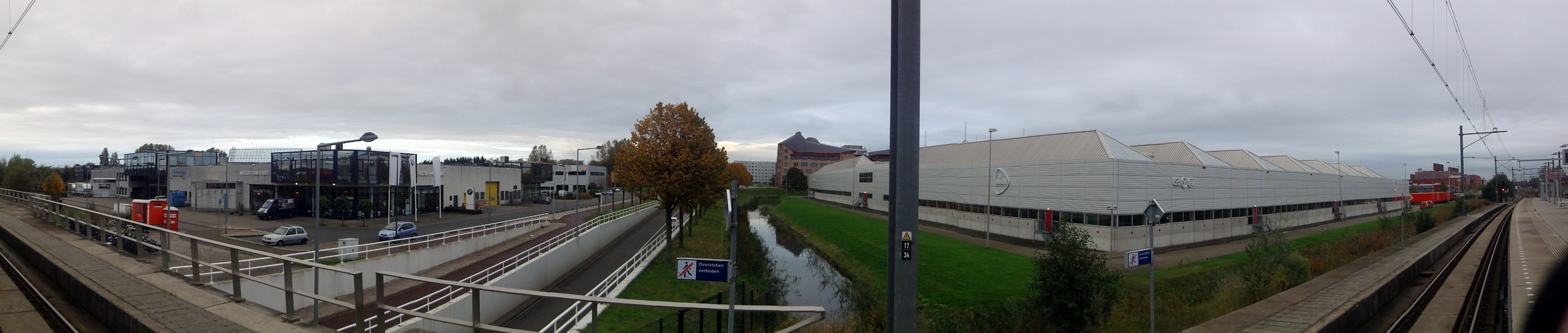
View of Forepark from the railway station

It was developed in the 1990s, together with the nearby residential neighbourhood Leidschenveen. Originally part of the municipality of Leidschendam, it was annexed by The Hague in 2002 and now falls under the district of Leidschenveen-Ypenburg.

Since 2007, Forepark is home to Cars Jeans Stadion, the home stadium of ADO Den Haag football club. Since the construction of the RandstadRail network, the business park is connected to the metro line between Rotterdam and the city centre of The Hague via Forepark Station.

Forepark has 160 inhabitants (as of 1 January 2014), and is divided into two sub-neighbourhoods, Westvliet (132 inhabitants) and De Rivieren (28 inhabitants).
