= Segbroek =

Coordinates: 52°04′38″N 4°15′41″E

- District of The Hague
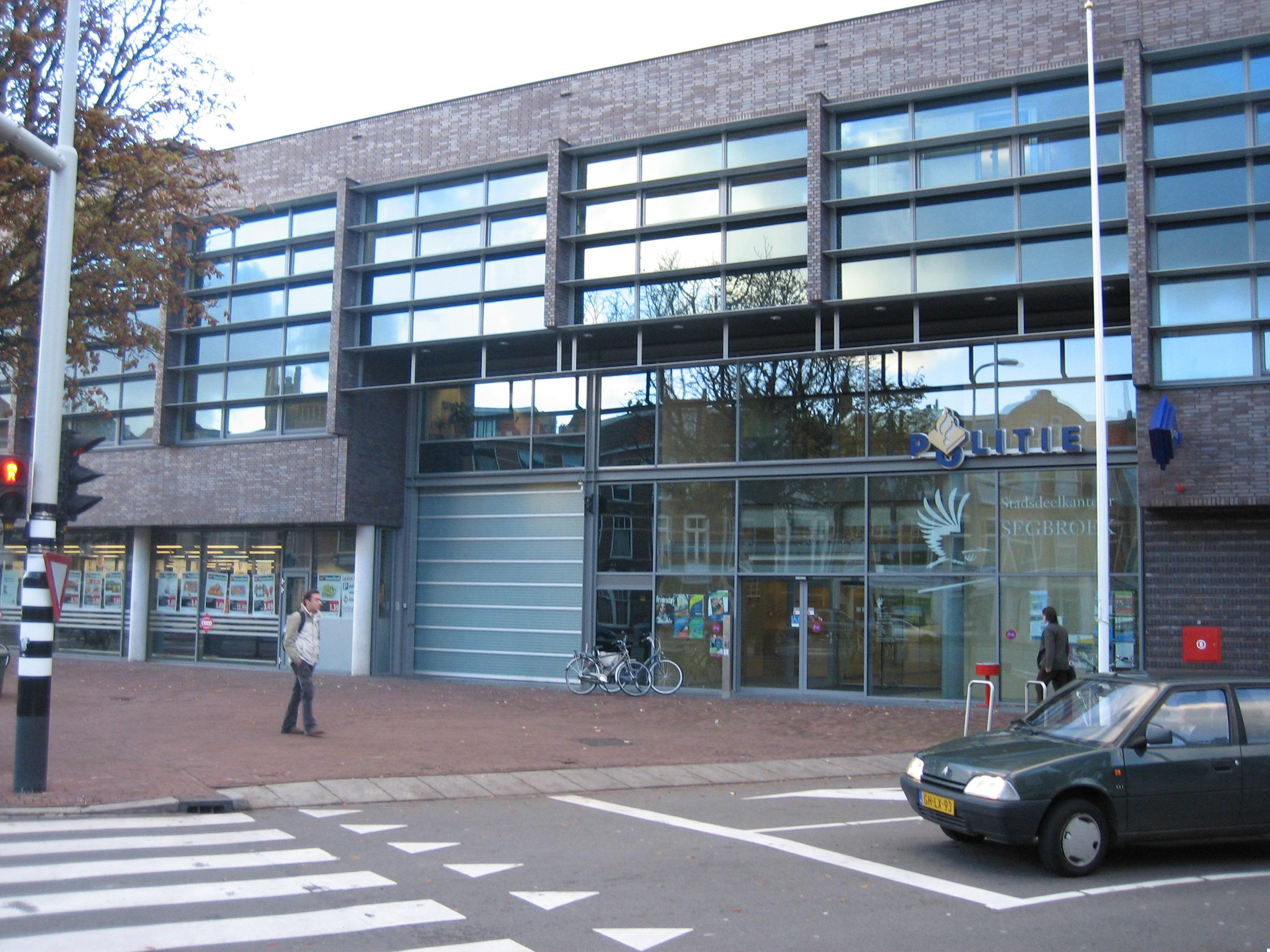
- Segbroek's sub-municipal office

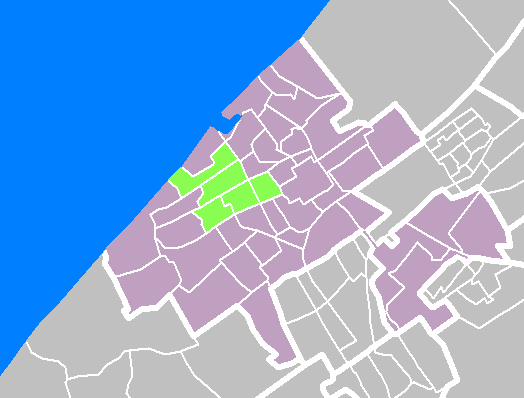
- Location in The Hague
- Country: Netherlands
- Province: South Holland
- Municipality: The Hague

Area
  - Total: 719.1 ha (1,777 acres)
  - Land: 703.8 ha (1,739 acres)

Population (2025)
  - Total: 63,259

Segbroek (Dutch pronunciation: [ˈsɛɣbruk]) is one of eight districts of The Hague in the Netherlands. The district was established by the city in 1988. It has a total area of 7.19 square kilometres (2.78 sq mi) and a population of 63,259 as of 1 January 2025. Segbroek is divided into five neighbourhoods: Bomen- en Bloemenbuurt, Regentessekwartier, Valkenboskwartier, Vogelwijk and Vruchtenbuurt.
