= People detained by the International Criminal Court =

ICC detention centre
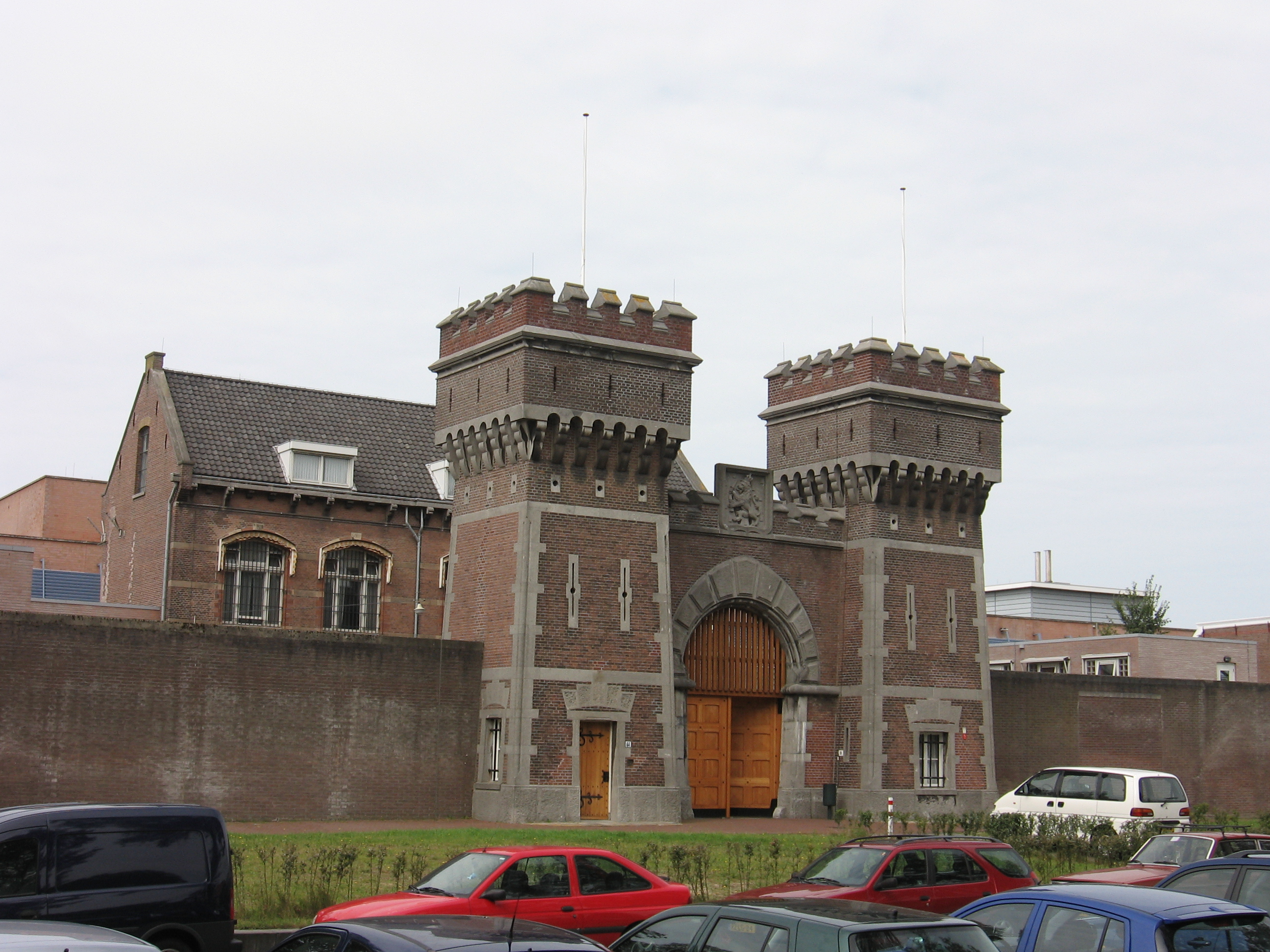
- Interactive map of ICC detention centre
- Location: Scheveningen, The Hague; 52.11061°N 4.301469°E
- Capacity: 12
- Opened: 2006
- Managed by: The ICC registrar

People detained by the International Criminal Court (ICC) are held in the ICC's detention centre, which is located within a Dutch prison in Scheveningen, The Hague. The ICC was established in 2002 as a permanent tribunal to prosecute individuals for genocide, crimes against humanity, war crimes, and the crime of aggression. As of June 2018, it has issued public arrest warrants for 42 individuals, six of whom are currently in custody of the court.

The ICC detention centre is only for holding people who have been charged by the ICC before and during their trials. Those found guilty are (after any appeals process is concluded) transferred to prisons in countries which have agreed to carry out ICC sentences, of which the Netherlands is not one.

== Detention centre ==
The ICC currently has twelve detention cells in a Dutch prison in Scheveningen, The Hague. Suspects held by the International Residual Mechanism for Criminal Tribunals are held in the same prison and share some facilities, like the fitness room, but have no contact with suspects held by the ICC.

The ICC registrar is responsible for managing the detention centre. The rules governing detainment are contained in Chapter 6 of the Regulations of the Court and Chapter 5 of the Regulations of the Registry. The International Committee of the Red Cross (ICRC) has unrestricted access to the detention centre.

=== Facilities ===
Each individual has their own toilet and washing area. Each has access to a small gym and is offered training with a physical education instructor.

Detainees are provided with meals, but they may also cook for themselves, purchase food from the prison shop, and have ingredients ordered in. However, Charles Taylor's lawyers have complained that "the food which is served is completely Eurocentric and not palatable to the African palate".

Each detainee has a personal computer in their cell, on which they can view material related to their case. A specific computer is designated to the defence, where they can upload case-related material for the detainee to view and comment on. They are offered computer training, if required, and language courses. Additionally, detainees are given access to fresh air, recreational and sports activities, as well as television and news.

== Detainees' rights ==
Detainees are allowed to communicate in private with their defense teams and diplomatic representatives of their countries of origin. They are permitted visits from family members, spouses and partners, and spiritual advisors.

== List of detainees ==
The following table lists all the people who have been held at the ICC detention centre since it was established in 2006. The first person detained by the court was Thomas Lubanga, who arrived at the detention centre on March 17, 2006.

Three former prisoners have been released or transferred, including Charles Taylor, who was tried in the Special Court for Sierra Leone. His trial was held at the ICC's facilities in The Hague because of political and security concerns about holding the trial in Freetown.

Name	Image	Arrived	Departed	Notes	Ref.
(Democratic Republic of the Congo) Thomas Lubanga Dyilo		17 March 2006	19 December 2015	Sentence of 14 years' imprisonment. On 19 December 2015, he was transferred to a prison facility in the Democratic Republic of the Congo (DRC) to serve his sentence of imprisonment.	
(Liberia) Charles Taylor		20 June 2006	15 October 2013	Tried by the Special Court for Sierra Leone, transferred to the United Kingdom to serve his sentence of 50 years' imprisonment.	
(Democratic Republic of the Congo) Germain Katanga		17 October 2007	19 December 2015	Sentence of 12 years' imprisonment. On 13 November 2015, the Appeals Chamber reduced his sentence. The date for the completion of the sentence is set to 18 January 2016. On 19 December 2015, Germain Katanga was transferred to a prison facility in the Democratic Republic of the Congo (DRC) to serve his sentence of imprisonment.	
(Democratic Republic of the Congo) Mathieu Ngudjolo Chui		7 February 2007	21 December 2012	Released following acquittal; appeal confirming previous sentence	
(Democratic Republic of the Congo) Jean-Pierre Bemba		3 July 2008	14 June 2018	Sentenced to 18 years' imprisonment as of 21 June 2016. His war crimes conviction was overturned on June 8, 2018. He has one appeal remaining regarding witness tampering.	
(Rwanda) Callixte Mbarushimana		25 January 2011	23 December 2011	Released following dismissal of charges	
(Ivory Coast) Laurent Gbagbo		30 November 2011	1 February 2019	Acquitted of charges. He was released conditionally on February 1, 2019, to reside in Belgium, because prosecutors appealed after his initial acquittal. Verdict was confirmed in 2021, and Gbagbo returned to Côte d'Ivoire on 17 June 2021.	
(Rwanda) Bosco Ntaganda		22 March 2013	14 December 2022	Found guilty of 18 counts of war crimes and crimes against humanity, and was sentenced to 30 years in prison. He was transferred to Belgian prison on 14 December 2022.	
(Central African Republic) Aimé Kilolo Musamba		25 November 2013	21 October 2014	Case in appeal stage	
(Democratic Republic of the Congo) Fidèle Babala Wandu		25 November 2013	21 October 2014	Case closed. He was sentenced in total to 6 months’ imprisonment.	
(Central African Republic) Jean-Jacques Mangenda Kabongo		4 December 2013	21 October 2014	Case in appeal stage	
(Central African Republic) Narcisse Arido		18 March 2014	21 October 2014	Case closed	
(Ivory Coast) Charles Blé Goudé		22 March 2014	1 February 2019	Acquitted of charges. He was conditionally released, as prosecutors appealed against verdict. After confirmation of his acquittal in 2021, he returned to Côte d'Ivoire on 26 November 2022.	
(Uganda) Dominic Ongwen		21 January 2015	18 December 2023	Sentence of 25 years' imprisonment. Found guilty of 61 counts of war crimes and crimes against humanity. The appeals chamber confirmed the guilt and verdict on 15 December 2022. Transferred to a Norwegian prison on 18 December 2023.	
(Mali) Ahmad al-Faqi al-Mahdi		26 September 2015	3 May 2019	Pleaded guilty; sentenced to nine years' imprisonment on September 27, 2016. Transferred to a UK prison on May 3, 2019.	
(Mali) al-Hassan Ag Abdoul Aziz		31 March 2018	—	Convicted of all but 3 charges on 26 June 2024, subsequently sentenced to 10 years' imprisonment. Remains in ICC custody as the court has yet to determine where the sentence will be served.	
(Central African Republic) Alfred Yekatom		17 November 2018	—	Convicted of various charges on 24 July 2025, sentenced to 15 years' imprisonment. Appeal pending.	
(Central African Republic) Patrice-Edouard Ngaïssona		23 January 2019	—	Convicted of various charges on 24 July 2025, sentenced to 12 years' imprisonment. Appeal pending.	
(Sudan) Ali Kushayb		9 June 2020	—	Convicted of war crimes and crimes against humanity on 6 October 2025. Sentenced 9 December 2025 to 20 years' imprisonment. Appeal pending.	
(Kenya) Paul Gicheru		3 November 2020	1 February 2021	Died on 27 September 2022; proceedings withdrawn on 14 October 2022.	
(Central African Republic) Mahamat Said Abdel Kani		24 January 2021	—	Convicted of 4 counts of crimes against humanity 23 September 2026; sentencing pending.	
(Central African Republic) Maxime Mokom		14 March 2022	17 October 2023	Released after charges were withdrawn	
(Philippines) Rodrigo Duterte		12 March 2025	–	Arrested 11 March 2025 and transferred to ICC custody the next day. Trial scheduled to begin on 30 November 2026.	
(Libya) Khaled Mohamed Ali El Hishri		1 December 2025	-	Case in pre-trial stage.	

== See also ==
- List of people indicted by the International Criminal Court
