= Leidschenveen-Ypenburg =

Coordinates: 52°03′11″N 4°23′38″E

- District of The Hague
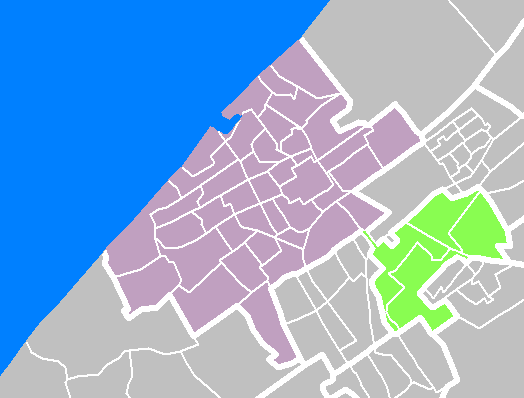
- Location of Leidschenveen-Ypenburg
- Country: Netherlands
- Province: South Holland
- Municipality: The Hague

Area
  - Total: 1,555.3 ha (3,843 acres)
  - Land: 1,406.8 ha (3,476 acres)

Population (1 January 2026)
  - Total: 47,557

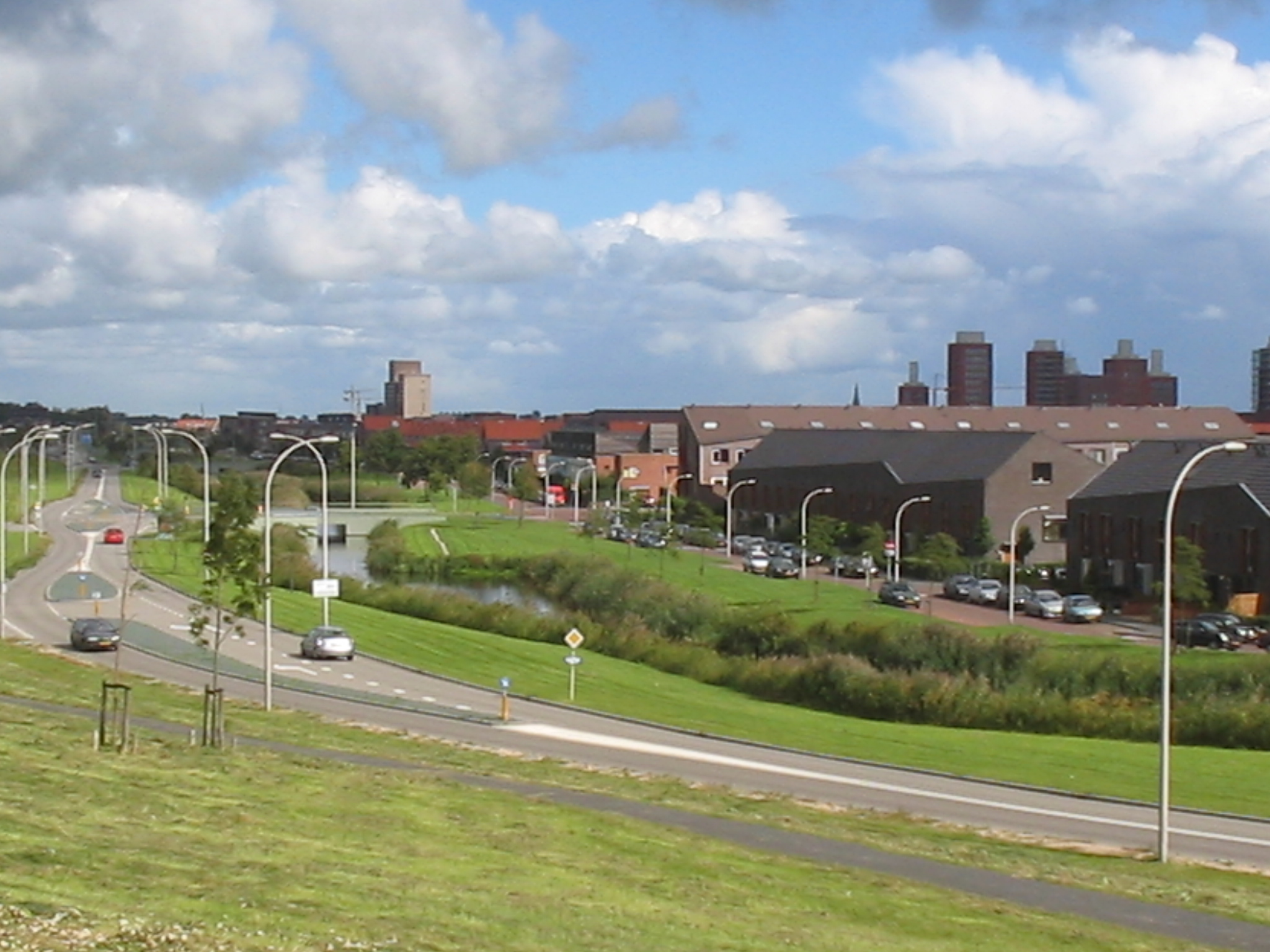
View on Ypenburg

Leidschenveen-Ypenburg (Dutch pronunciation: [ˈlɛitsə(ɱ)ˌveːn ˈipə(m)ˌbʏr(ə)x]) is a Vinex-location and district of The Hague, located in the southeast. It is geographically connected to the main body of the city by only a narrow corridor. It consists of four quarters: Hoornwijk and Ypenburg on the southwest of the A12 motorway and parallel railway to Utrecht, and Forepark and Leidschenveen on the northeast.

Since 2005 the district has its own railway station, Den Haag Ypenburg, situated on the Gouda–Den Haag railway.

Two highway nodes are located in the district: Knooppunt Ypenburg and the Prins Clausplein.

== History ==
Until 1992 Ypenburg was a military airfield known as Ypenburg Airport. It was the site of the Battle for The Hague on 10 May 1940, at the beginning of World War II. German forces took over the airfield via an airborne landing, with the goal of apprehending Dutch government officials and the Queen. This failed however and Dutch forces recaptured the airfield. The Netherlands eventually surrendered to Germany however, and the Luftwaffe made no use of the airfield during the remainder of the war. Very little remains of the airport today, the former air traffic control tower being a notable exception.

After the war the field remained a civilian airport until 1955, when it was turned into an Air Base. After 1968, operations decreased significantly; the Air Base was used mainly as a VIP airport for politicians and the royal family. In 1982 it was decided to close the Air Base, but it was not until 1992 that it was abandoned by the Royal Netherlands Air Force. In 1997 the new residential area was constructed on the site of the airport. Initially, Leidschenveen belonged to the municipality Leidschendam, whereas Ypenburg fell under Nootdorp and Rijswijk. These parts were merged and annexed by The Hague municipality in 2002.
