= Ypenburg Air Base =

Former Dutch airport

Coordinates: 52.041°N 4.357°E

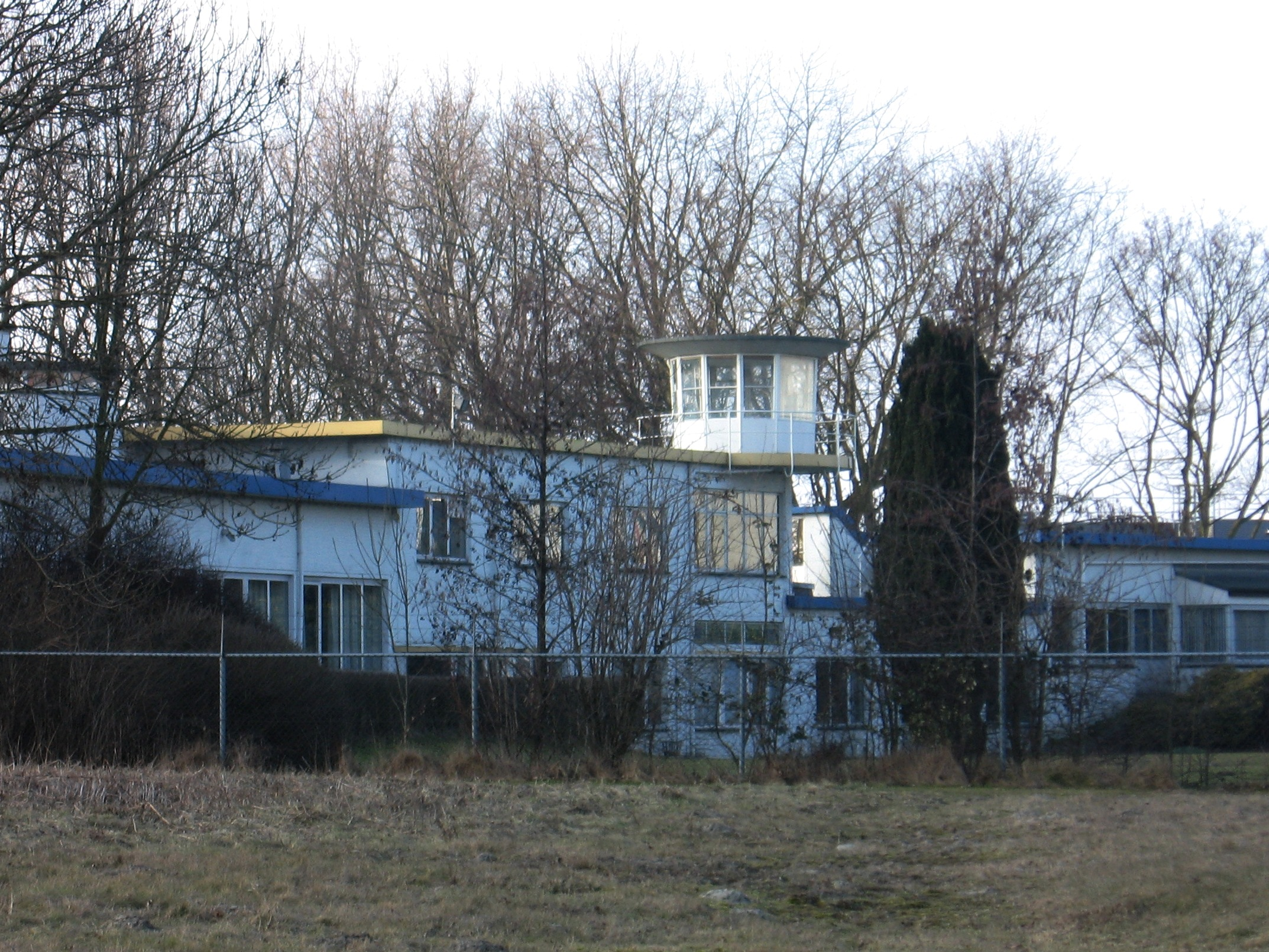
The former air traffic control tower for Ypenburg airport

Ypenburg Airport (Dutch: Vliegveld Ypenburg), which later became Ypenburg Air Base was an airport in the Netherlands in Leidschenveen-Ypenburg near the city of The Hague. The ICAO code was EHYB.

== History ==
The airfield was established in 1936, initially for recreational purposes. At the beginning of World War II German forces attempted to capture the airfield, in 1940, via an airborne landing during the Battle for The Hague. This failed however and Dutch forces recaptured the airfield. After the Netherlands eventually surrendered to Germany, the Luftwaffe made little use of the airfield during the remainder of the war.

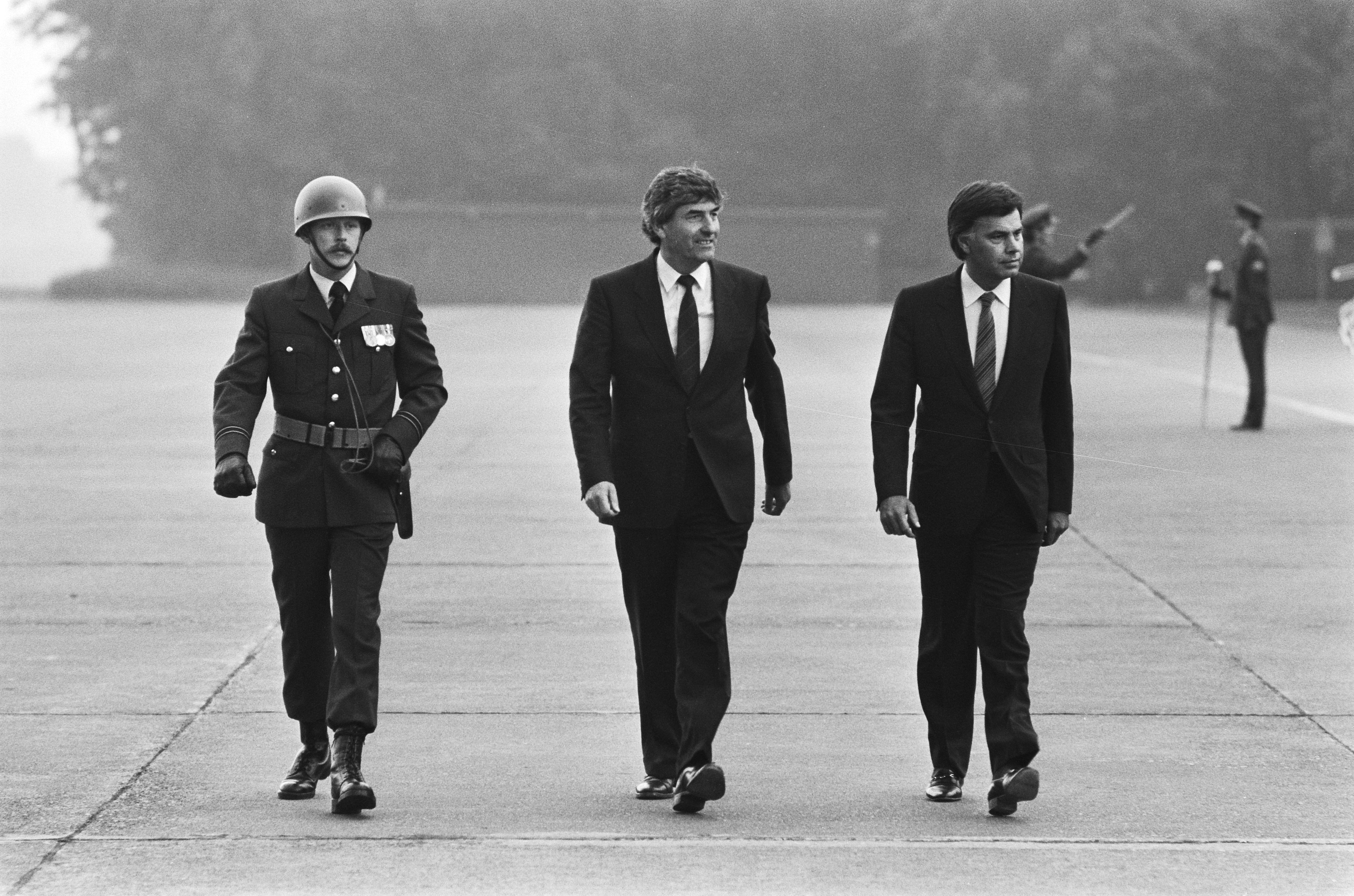
Spanish Prime Minister Felipe González arriving at Ypenburg Airport, with Dutch Prime Minister Ruud Lubbers in 1985

After the war the field remained a civilian airport until 1955, when it was turned into an Air Base. After 1968, operations decreased significantly; the Air Base was used mainly as a VIP airport for politicians and the royal family. In 1982 it was decided to close the Air Base, but it was not until 1992 that it was abandoned by the Royal Netherlands Air Force. Among the last aircraft to use the airport were military cargo aircraft heading towards Kuwait during the Gulf War. In 1997 a new residential area was constructed on the site of the airport, Leidschenveen-Ypenburg. Very little remains of the airport today, the former air traffic control tower being a notable exception.
