= Ahmad al-Faqi al-Mahdi =

Member of Ansar Dine in North Africa

- Born: 1975 (age 50–51); Agoune, Mali
- Occupation: Civil servant
- Employer: Malian government
- Known for: First person convicted by the ICC for such a crime
- Movement: Ansar Dine
- Status: Released
- Criminal charges: Attacking religious and historical buildings
- Penalty: Nine years in prison (commuted to 7 years in 2021)
- Wanted since: 18 September 2015

Details
- Span of crimes: 30 June 2012 – 10 July 2012
- Country: Mali
- Location: Timbuktu
- Target: 10 religious buildings

Ahmad al-Faqi al-Mahdi (also known as Abu Tourab) was a member of Ansar Dine, a Tuareg Islamist militia in North Africa. Al-Mahdi admitted guilt in the International Criminal Court (ICC) in 2016 for the war crime of attacking religious and historical buildings in the Malian city of Timbuktu. Al-Mahdi was the first person convicted by the ICC for such a crime, and in general the first individual to ever be prosecuted solely on the basis of cultural crimes. He was sentenced to nine years in prison. On 25 November 2021, his sentence was commuted to 7 years in prison, and he was released on 18 September 2022.

== Biography ==
Al-Mahdi was born approximately in 1975 in Agoune, Mali, which is 97 km west of Timbuktu. In 2011, he was a civil servant in the Malian government. He is an ethnic Tuareg and during the Northern Mali conflict, that began in 2012, he was a member of Ansar Dine. Al-Mahdi worked closely with the leaders of Ansar Dine and al-Qaeda in the Islamic Maghreb, when the two groups controlled Timbuktu. Specifically, he enforced decisions of the Islamic Court of Timbuktu and from May to September 2012, he ran the "Manners' Brigade".

== ICC prosecution ==
The ICC opened a formal investigation on Mali, after referral of the situation by Mali to the Prosecutor, on 16 January 2013 to investigate alleged crimes, that occurred since January 2012 in the context of an armed conflict in the north of the country. The court issued an arrest warrant for al-Mahdi on 18 September 2015. The arrest warrant alleges, that from about 30 June 2012 to 10 July 2012 in Timbuktu, al-Mahdi committed the war crime of intentionally directing attacks against historical monuments or buildings dedicated to religion. The case against al-Mahdi represented the first time, the ICC had indicted an individual for the war crime of attacking religious buildings or historical monuments and it was the first case, before the ICC arising out of the situation in Mali. The arrest warrant listed ten monuments in Timbuktu, at least one of which is a World Heritage Site, that al-Mahdi attacked:

1. Mausoleum of Sidi Mahmoud Ben Omar Mohamed Aquit
2. Mausoleum of Sheikh Mohamed Mahmoud al-Arawani
3. Mausoleum of Sheikh Sidi el-Mokhtar Ben Sidi Muhammad Ben Sheikh Alkabir
4. Mausoleum of Alfa Moya
5. Mausoleum of Sidi Mahmoud Ben Amar
6. Mausoleum of Sheikh Muhammad El Micky
7. Mausoleum of Cheick Abdoul Kassim Attouaty
8. Mausoleum of Ahamed Fulane
9. Mausoleum of Bahaber Babadié
10. Sidi Yahya Mosque

On 26 September 2015, al-Mahdi was surrendered to the court by the government of Niger and transferred to the court's detention center in The Hague, Netherlands.

Al-Mahdi's trial began on 22 August 2016 and he pleaded guilty to the charges of destroying nine mausoleums and a mosque. As the first person to plead guilty to a charge of the ICC, al-Mahdi made a statement expressing remorse and advising others not to commit similar acts.

On 27 September 2016, al-Mahdi was sentenced to nine years in prison for the destruction of the cultural world heritage in the Malian city of Timbuktu.

In a subsequent Reparations Order of 17 August 2017, the ICC ordered individual, collective and symbolic reparations for the community of Timbuktu. The liability of al-Mahdi was determined to be 2.7 million euros.

On 25 November 2021, his sentence was reduced on appeal to seven years imprisonment, and he was released on 18 September 2022.
