= Scheveningen =

- District
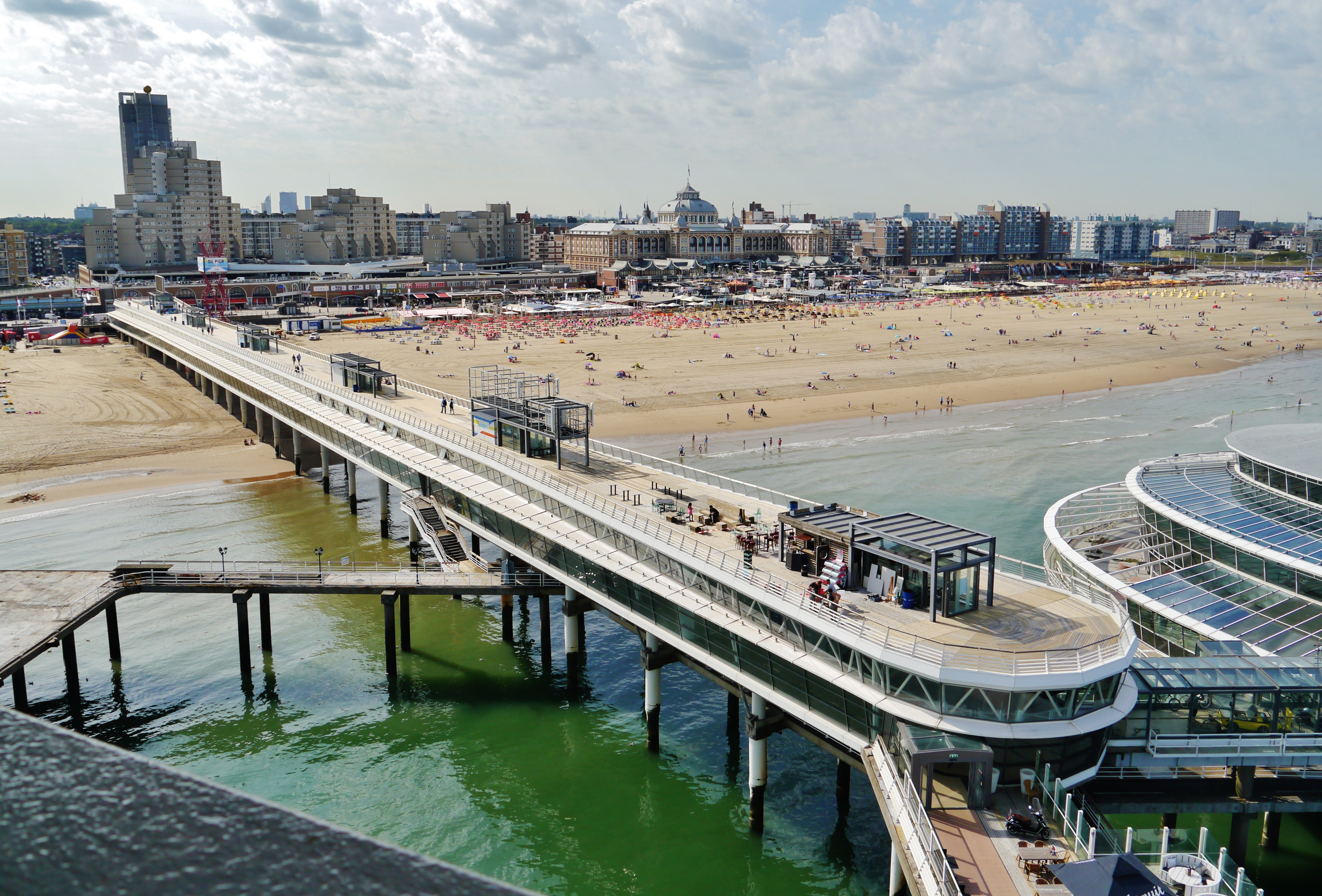
- A view of the Scheveningen Pier with the Kurhaus in the background

- Flag Coat of arms

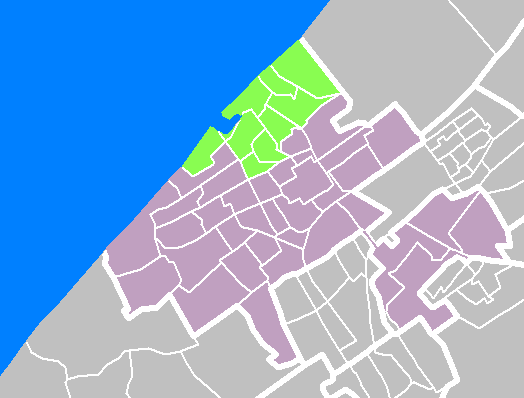
- Map of The Hague, Scheveningen marked green

- Location of Scheveningen in the Netherlands
- Coordinates: 52°06′29″N 4°16′23″E
- Country: Netherlands
- Province: South Holland
- Municipality: The Hague

Area
  - Land: 230 ha (570 acres)

Population (1 January 2026)
  - Total: 61,384
  - Density: 27,000/km^{2} (69,000/sq mi)
- Website: www.denhaag.nl/nl/in-de-stad/stadsdelen/scheveningen.htm

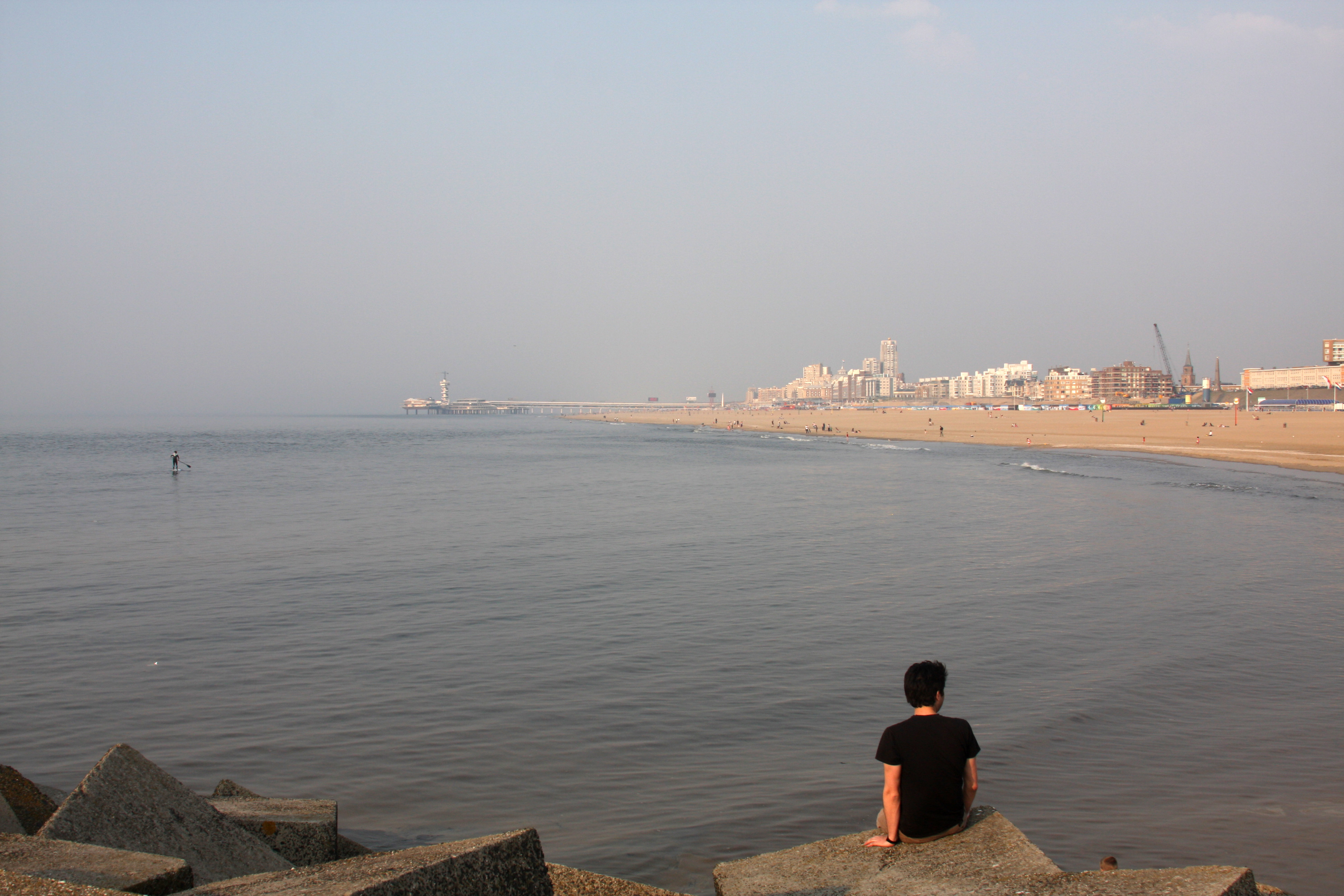
Scheveningen pier in the background, view from the harbour's breakwater

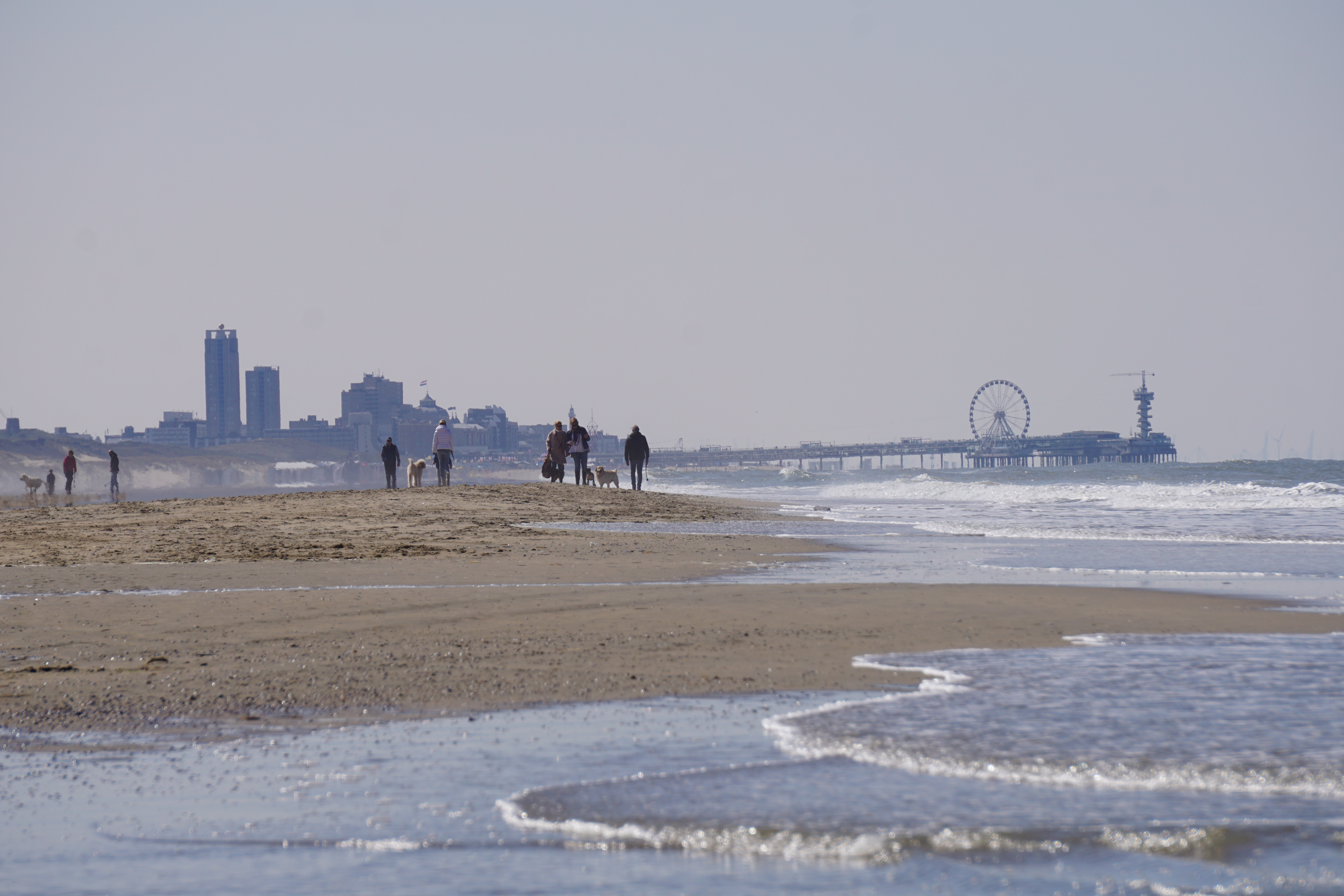
Scheveningen pier viewed from the beach near Wassenaar

Scheveningen (Dutch pronunciation: [ˈsxeːvənɪŋə(n)]) is one of the eight districts of The Hague, Netherlands, as well as a subdistrict (wijk) of that city. Scheveningen is a modern seaside resort with a long, sandy beach, an esplanade, a pier, and a lighthouse. The beach is popular for water sports such as windsurfing and kiteboarding. The harbour is used for both fishing and tourism.

== History ==
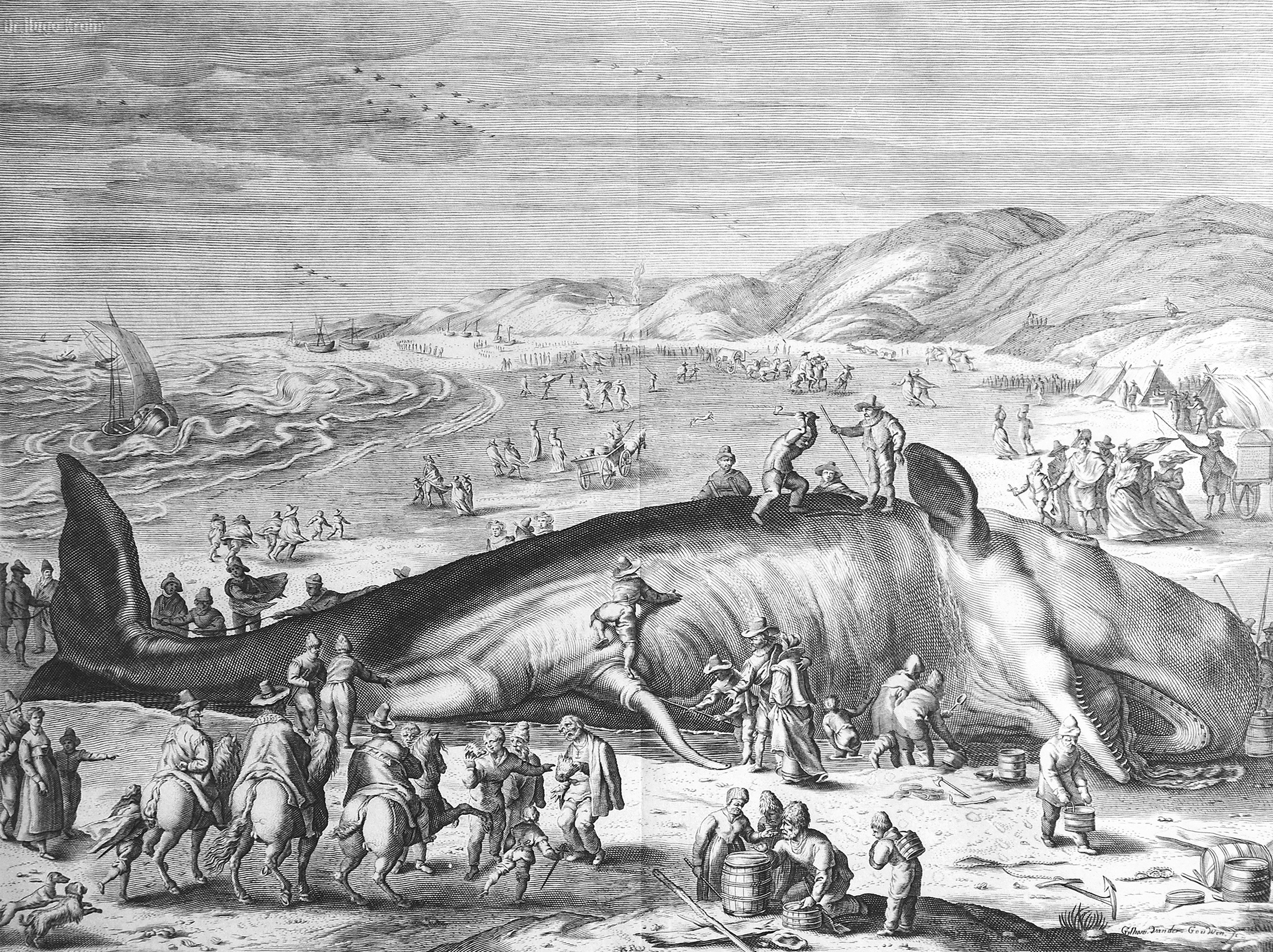
The engraving by Gilliam van der Gouwen shows a 20-m-long (70 ft) whale, stranded on the Dutch coast between Scheveningen and Katwijk on February 3, 1598.

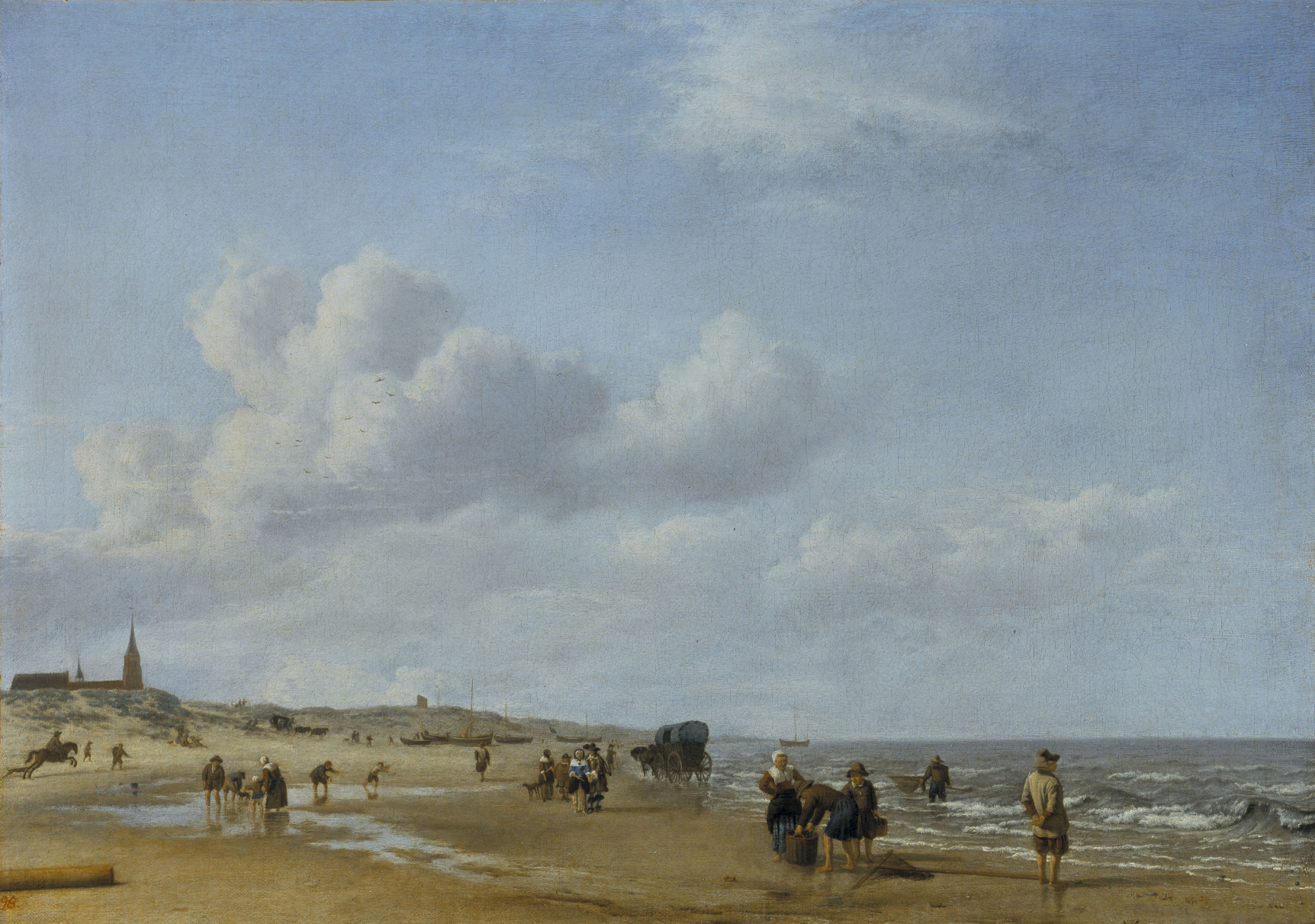
The beach at Scheveningen by Adriaen van de Velde, painted 1658

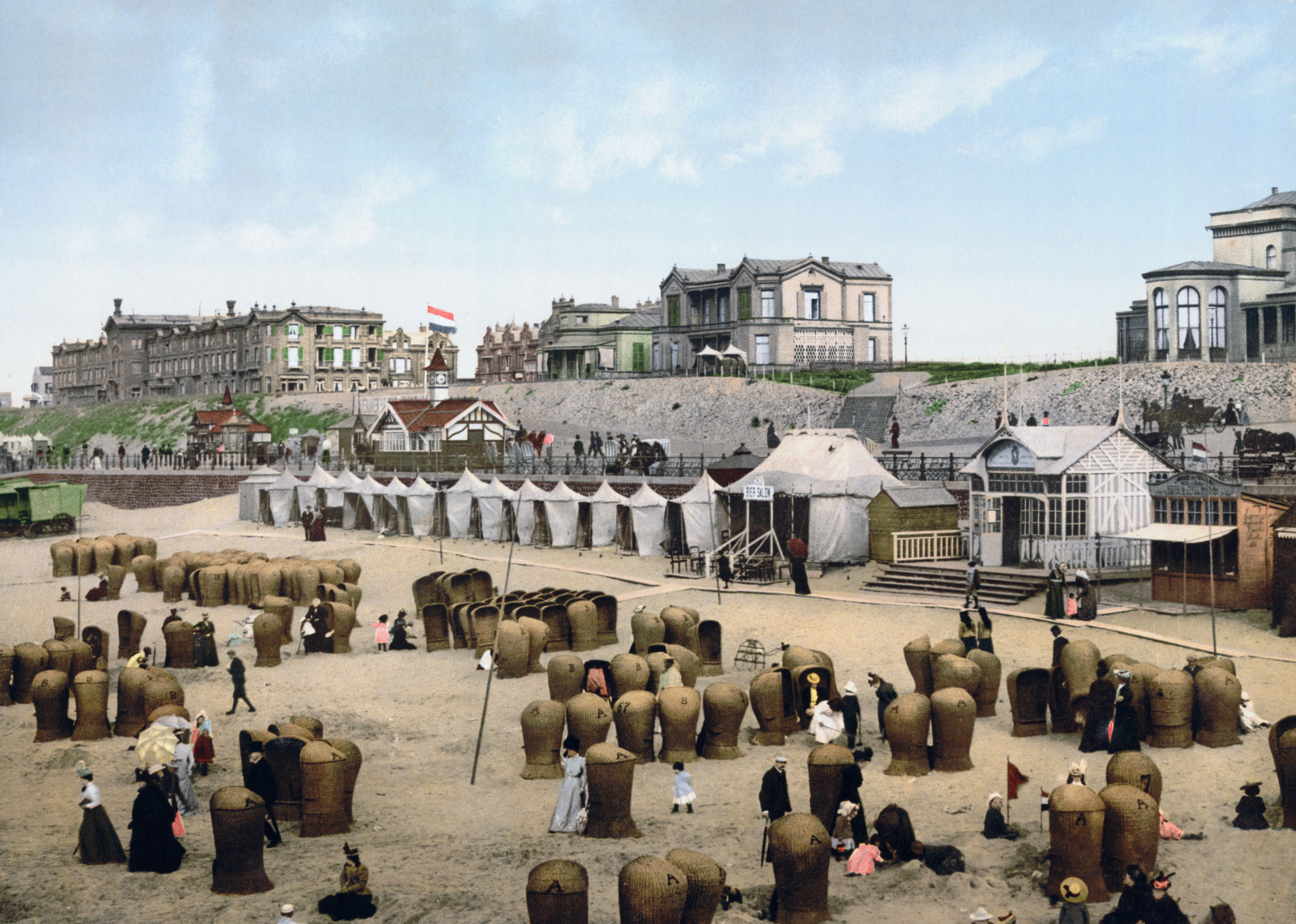
A photochrom of the beach c. 1900

The earliest reference to the name Sceveninghe goes back to around 1280. The first inhabitants may have been Anglo-Saxons. Other historians favour a Scandinavian origin. Fishing was the main source of food and income.

The Battle of Scheveningen was fought between English and Dutch fleets off the coast of the village on 10 August 1653. Thousands of people gathered on the shore to watch. In 1660 Montagu's flagship picked up the English king at Scheveningen in order to accomplish the Restoration.

A road to neighbouring The Hague was constructed in 1663 (current name: Scheveningseweg).

In 1470, a heavy storm destroyed the church and half the houses. The village was again hit by storms in 1570, 1775, 1825, 1860, 1881, and 1894. After this last storm, the villagers decided to build a harbour. Until then, the fishing boats had had a flat bottom (bomschuiten), and were pulled up the beach. By around 1870, over 150 of these boats were in use. Once the harbour had been constructed in 1904, more modern ships replaced the bomschuiten.

In 1818, Jacob Pronk constructed a wooden building on a dune near the sea, from where people could bathe from four separate rooms. It marked the start of Scheveningen as a bathing resort. Since then, Scheveningen has attracted numerous tourists from all over Europe, notably from Germany.

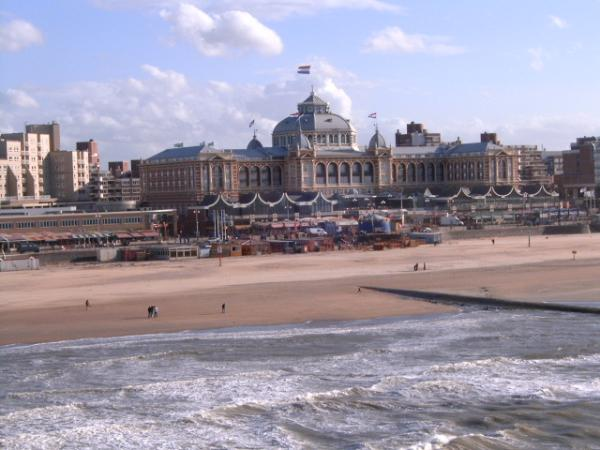
The Kurhaus

The hotel Kurhaus was opened in 1886. The village attracted a number of Dutch artists over the centuries, who painted the bomschuiten drawn up on the beach, or fishermen at work in the North Sea. Notable painters who recorded the village include Adriaen van de Velde, Simon de Vlieger, and Hendrik Willem Mesdag, whose large panorama, 14 m high and 120 m wide, preserved the view of Scheveningen in 1881.

The International Skating Union was founded in Scheveningen in 1892.

Anecdotal evidence exists of the name Scheveningen being used as a shibboleth during World War II to identify German spies: they would pronounce the initial Sch as one consonant (the voiceless palato-alveolar fricative, pronounced approximately like ʃ, ⟨sh⟩), rather than the native Dutch sequence of the voiceless alveolar sibilant followed by the voiceless uvular fricative: sχ, ⟨Skh⟩, as in Genghis Khan.

Scheveningen was never an independent municipality, but it has its own coat of arms, officially recognised by The Hague local council (proposal 136 of 23 March 1984); even in the Middle Ages, it was part of the same administrative region as The Hague.

Nevertheless, Scheveningen always had a strong identity of its own. For instance, it had its own football club, playing in the highest Dutch division (its name was "Scheveningen Holland Sport"). In the course of the second half of the 20th century, this club was forced to merge with ADO Den Haag.

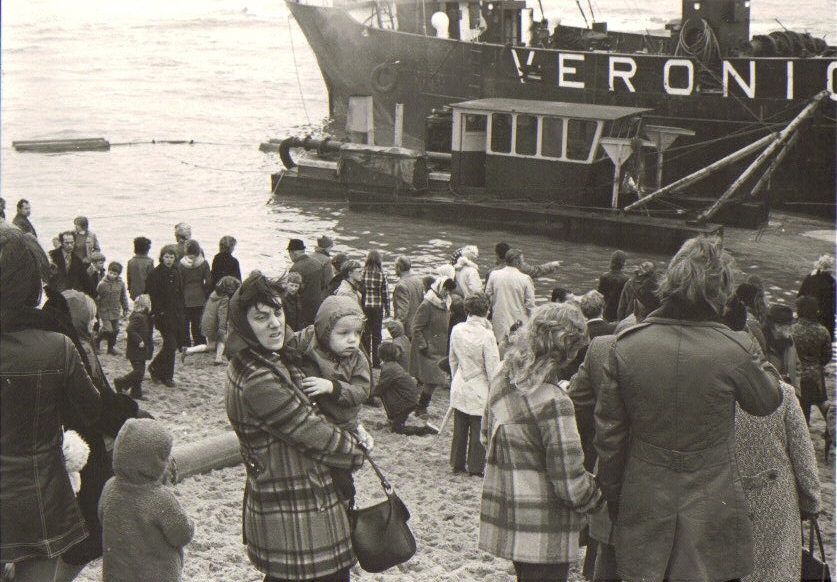
Veronica ship MV Norderney, Scheveningen (7 April 1973)

From 21 April 1960, the pirate radio station Radio Veronica broadcast its programmes from an anchorage in the North Sea about four miles off the Scheveningen coast, originally calling itself Vrije Radio Omroep Nederland (VRON), Free Radio Station [of the] Netherlands. It was joined by Radio Noordzee Internationaal in 1970 and the relaunched Radio Caroline in late 1972. When the Netherlands ratified the Treaty of Strasbourg on 1 September 1974, Veronica applied for legal status and became the VOO, Caroline moved anchorage to the English coast, and RNI closed down. Memorable episodes during this period included the stranding of Radio Veronica's ship, the Norderney, which lost its anchor in a storm and ran aground on Scheveningen beach on 2 April 1973, and a firebomb attack on RNI's ship, the Mebo II, on 15 May 1971.

Since the 1970s the population of the original Scheveningen changed as the fishing industry declined and some artists and professionals moved in. Most of the fishermen, captains and trawler owners houses were demolished. Some still remain and have been protected by the authorities, including some of the original 'hofjes', in an enclosed area with small row houses on each side.

Slobodan Milošević, the 3rd president of Serbia and Montenegro was found dead in his prison cell on 11 March 2006 while he was being held in the UN war crimes tribunal's detention center in Scheveningen.

== Culture ==
Until recently, some elderly women still wore local Scheveningen costume, while the local Scheveningen dialect is hardly spoken by young people anymore.

Because of the closedness of the original village community, many shared the same surnames. This led to the introduction of nicknames in order to distinguish families better. For example, certain members from the Pronk family were known as 'the horse man', 'Piet the mouse', 'Born without a tooth' or 'Gerrit de sermon'. Some common 'typical Scheveningen' family names are, for example, Bal, Dijkhuizen, Groen, Korving, Den Heijer, Knoester, De Niet, Plugge, Pronk, Rog, Spaans, Taal, Toet, Vrolijk, Zuurmond and Van der Zwan. Through the opening up of the fishing village from the beginning of the 20th century, this phenomenon has gradually become obsolete.

== Events and attractions ==
Duindorp bonfire in 2018

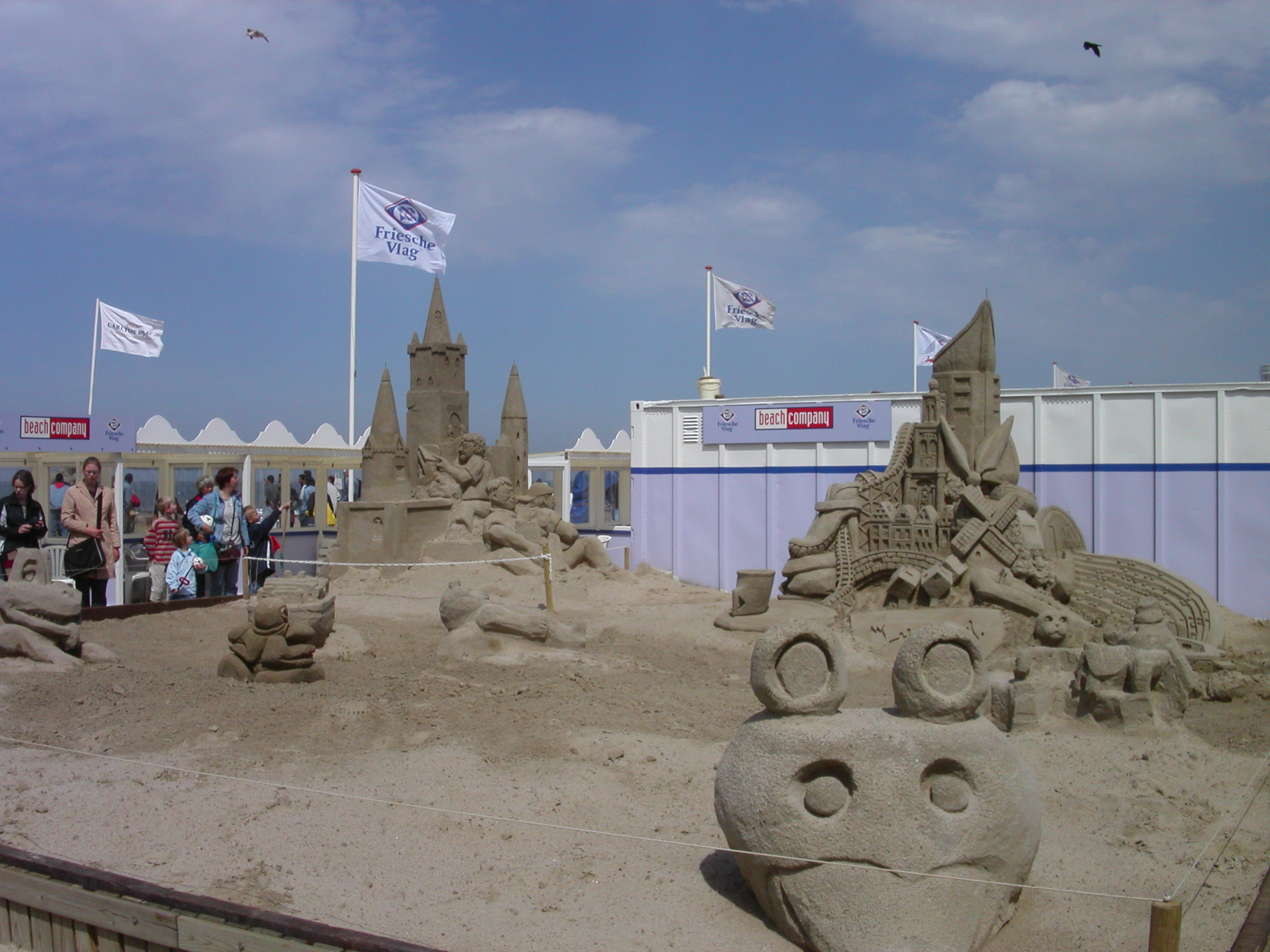
Annual sand sculpture competition at Scheveningen

Annual events include:

- Winter swim on New Year's Day, locally known as Nieuwjaarsduik (New Year's dive). The event is sponsored by Unox who provide soup and oliebollen to participants. They also give out signature orange Unox beanies, which apart from their aesthetic value also help rescuers identify swimmers.
- Flags Day in spring when the first new herring of the year is auctioned
- Fireworks in summer: once a week and several days during a festival week
- Vreugdevuur from second Christmas Day to New Year's Eve: a large competition between two subdivisions of Scheveningen (Duindorp and Scheveningen dorp) to build the largest tower made out of pallets and then light it on fire to signal the beginning of the year, Duindorp currently holds the world record.

A visit to Scheveningen can include:

- The Muzee Museum (official museum of Scheveningen)
- The pier
- Bungee jumping
- Ziplining
- The miniature city Madurodam
- The sculptures at sea museum Beelden aan Zee
- The Panorama Mesdag
- The four different beaches of Scheveningen
- Our Lady of Lourdes (RC) Silent Center, housing a replica of the Lourdes Grotto in Massabielle (France).

Night life includes the Pathé Scheveningen movie theatre, and the sea-front boulevard with its bars, restaurants, casino and other entertainment.

== Museums ==
- Atlantikwall Museum Scheveningen
- Bunker Museum Den Haag
- Beelden aan Zee
- Muzee Scheveningen
- Museumschip Hr. Ms. Mercuur, former Aggressive-class minesweeper

== Lighthouse ==
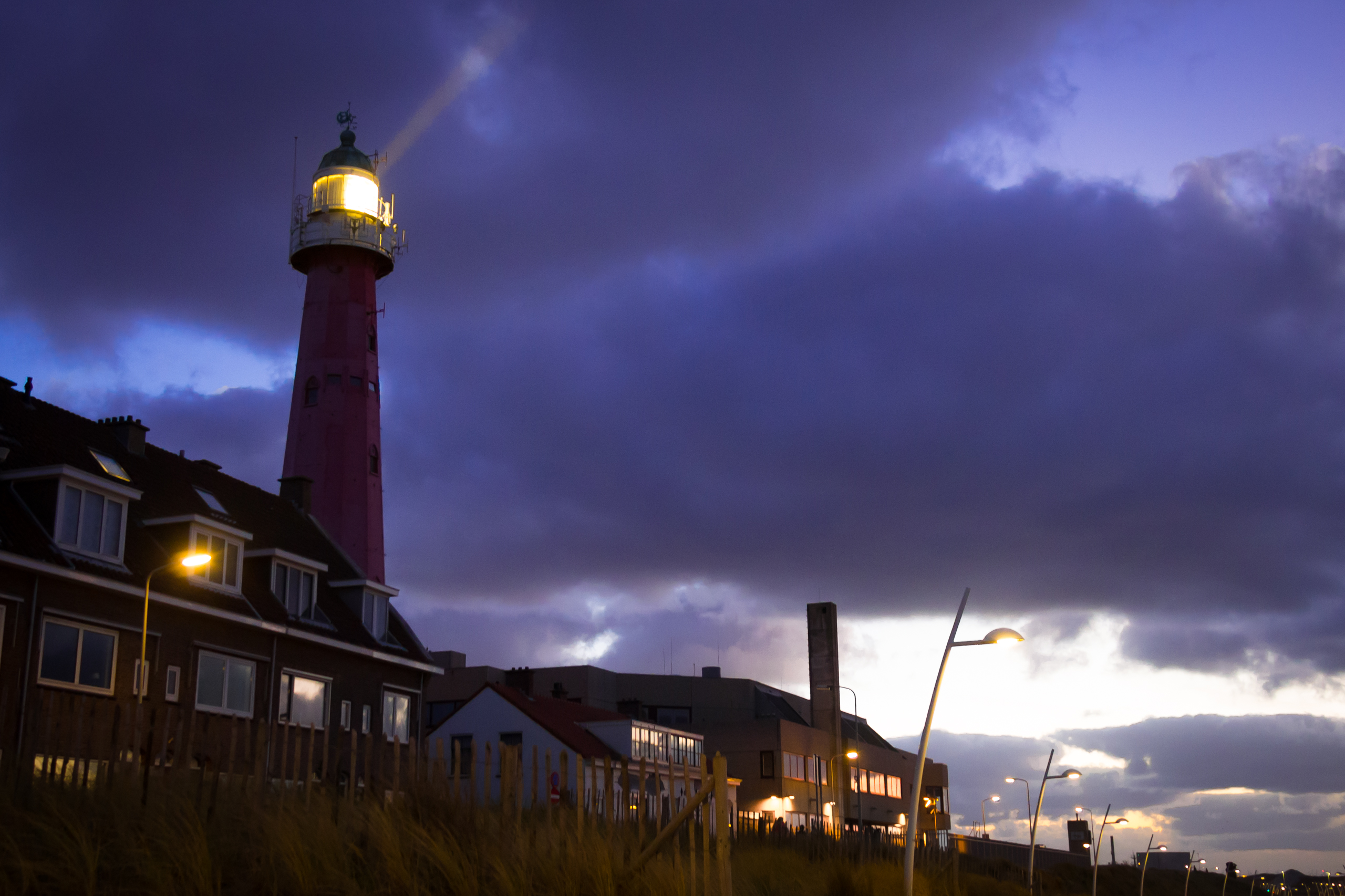
Scheveningen lighthouse

The light beam flashes at alternate intervals of 2.5 and 7.5 seconds. The location is 52°6.247′N 4°16.095′E.

== Chess ==
In the game of chess, the Scheveningen Variation of the Sicilian Defense takes its name from a 1923 chess tournament played in the district. During the tournament, the variation was played by several players, for instance by the future Dutch world chess champion Max Euwe.

== Subdistricts ==
The subdistricts of district Scheveningen are:

- Scheveningen
- Duinoord
- Statenkwartier
- Belgisch Park
- Oostduinen
- Maduroplein
- Duindorp
- Van Stolkpark
- Westbroekpark

== Noted natives ==
- Machiel de Graaf (b. 1969), politician
- Romy Haag (b. 1948), dancer, singer and actress
- Theo Jansen (b. 1948), artist
- Cornelis Jol (1597–1641), admiral and privateer
- Dick Jol (b. 1956), football referee
- Martin Jol (b. 1956), football manager and player
- Wim Kan (1911–1983), cabaret artist
- Bert Pronk (1950–2005), cyclist
- Jan Pronk (b. 1940), politician and diplomat
- Tim Smit (b.1954), businessman, composer, environmentalist and archaeologist
- Hans Heinrich Thyssen-Bornemisza (1921–2001), industrialist
