= Spuipoort =

The Spuipoort was one of the gates which used to make it possible to leave the Binnenhof in Den Haag. The gate stood on an island. There was a fixed bridge between the island and the Binnenhof, and on the other side of the gate there was a drawbridge. The Spuipoort connected the Spui to an island that in turn was connected by a bridge to the Hofpoort, which gave access to the Binnenhof. The Spuipoort was built in the 14th century and was demolished in 1861 by order of Chief Government Architect Willem Nicolaas Rose.

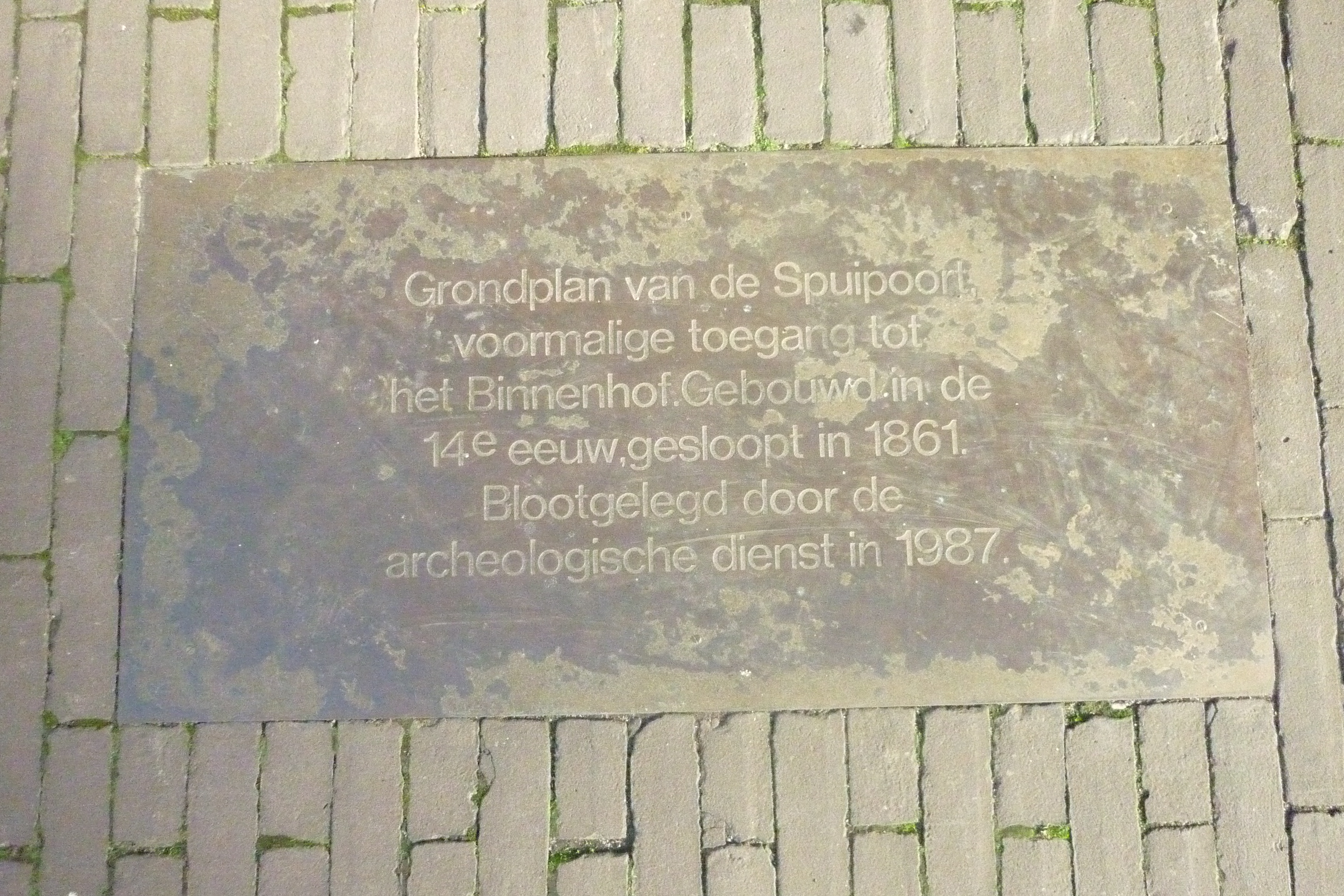
Ground plan information

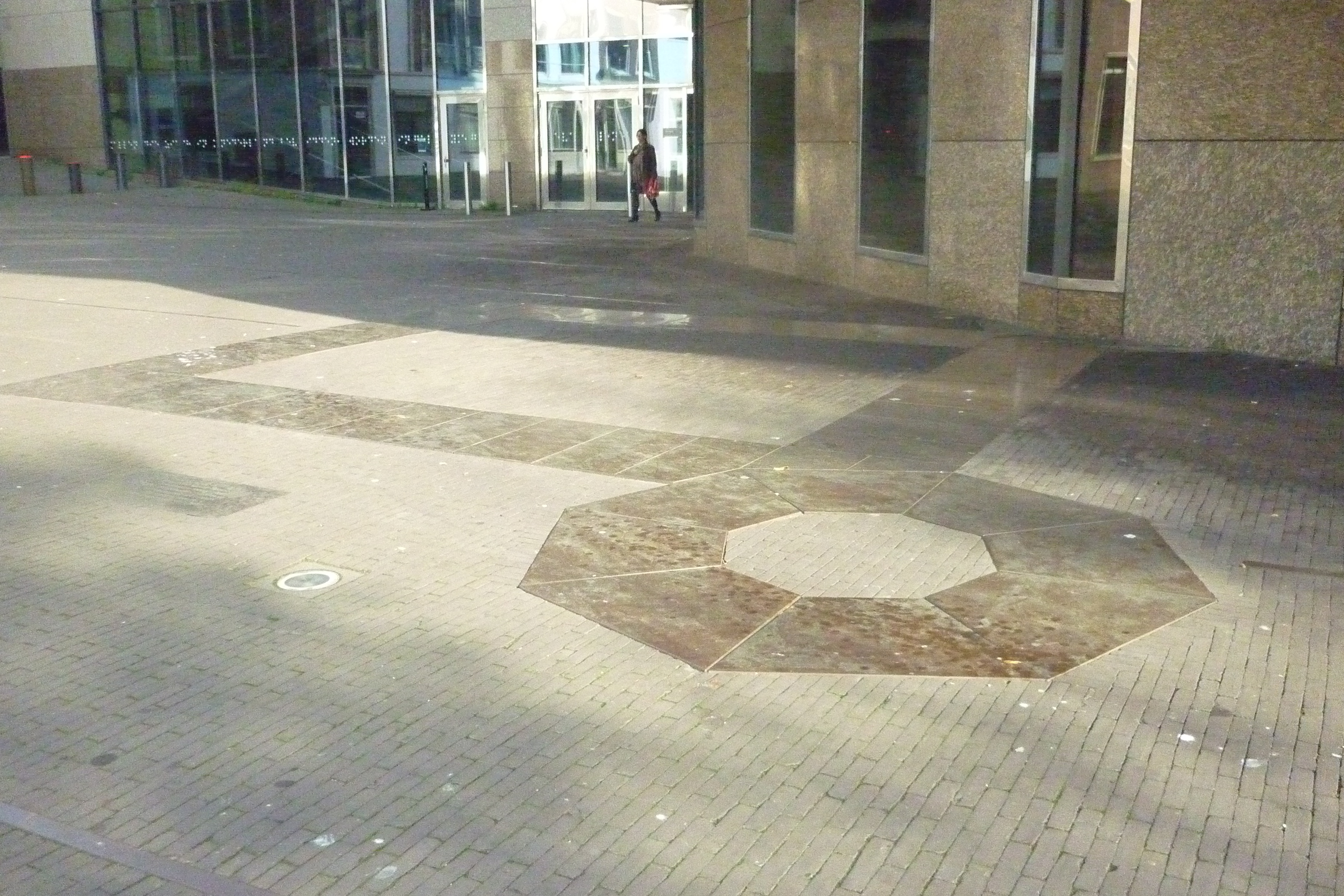
Ground plan in brass
