= Torentje =

Office of the Prime Minister of the Netherlands in the Binnenhof

Coordinates: 52°4′49″N 4°18′50″E

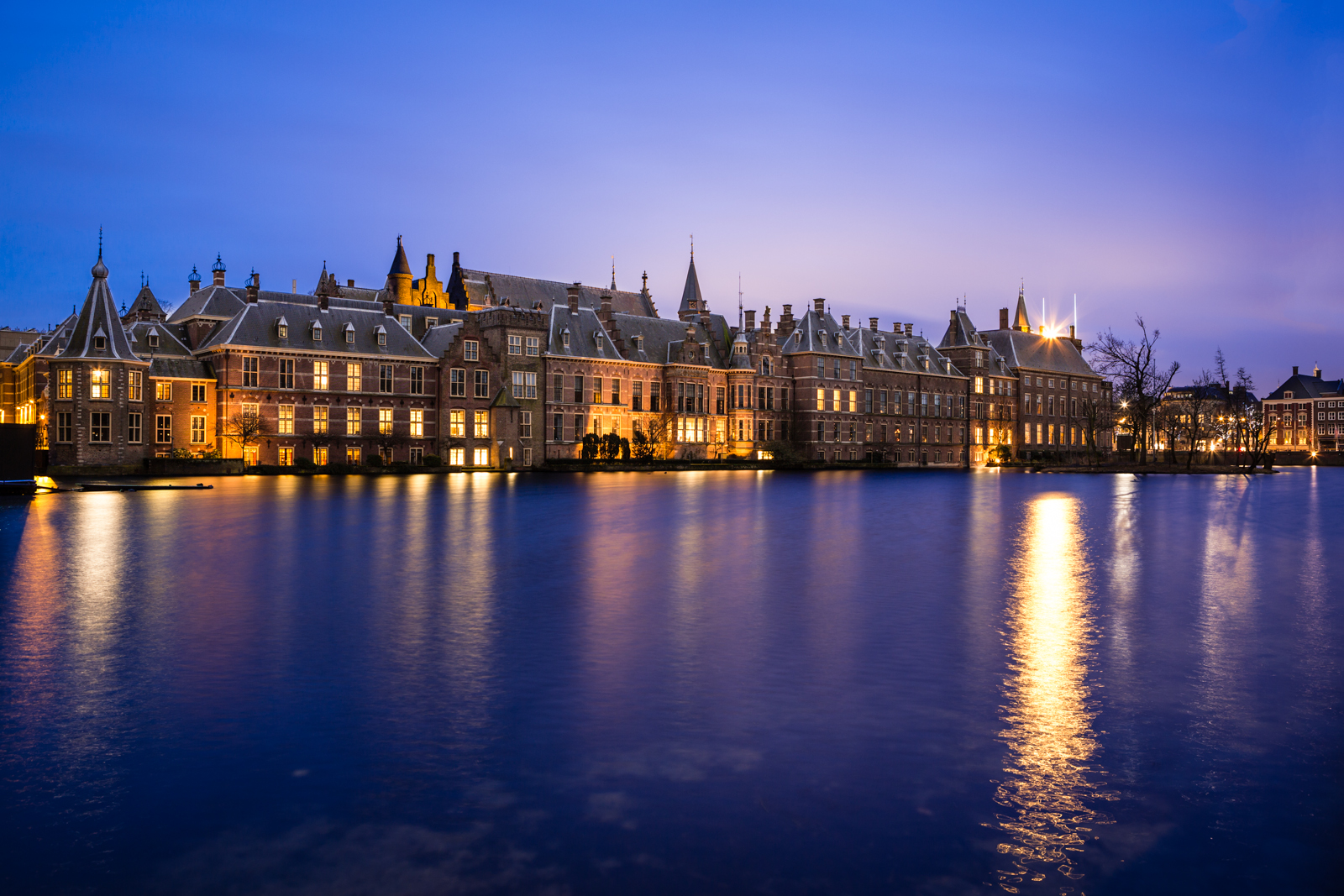
A view of the Binnenhof with the Torentje on the left

The Torentje (Dutch: Het Torentje [ə ˈtoːrə(ɲ)tɕə]; English: "The Little Tower"), located at the Binnenhof in The Hague next to the Mauritshuis museum, has been the office of the Prime Minister of the Netherlands since 1982.

== History ==
The Torentje is a small octagonal building next to the Hofvijver, which is first mentioned in chronicles in 1354 and probably dates from the first half of the 14th century. Located at the edge of the Parliament Buildings, it was originally a summer gazebo for the Counts of Holland. It was connected by a drawbridge with the counts' garden. At the site of this garden, east of the Tower, the Mauritshuis (now a museum) was built around 1640 as the residence for John Maurice, Prince of Nassau-Siegen. Since 2024 the Torentje has not been in use due to fire-safety concerns.

== Location ==
The building is part of the Binnenhof complex, the seat of the Dutch parliament (Eerste Kamer and Tweede Kamer) as well as the Ministry of General Affairs (housed in the Torentje). East of the Tower is the Mauritshuis and the Grenadierspoort, which gives access to the Parliament Buildings. Directly opposite the Tower are offices of the House of Representatives. The Tower itself is part of the portfolio of the Rijksgebouwendienst.

== Usage ==
The octagonal building has two small floors. On the ground floor the building sports a small meeting room, and the first floor houses the office of the Prime Minister of the Netherlands, who is also Minister of General Affairs. It was first used for this purpose by Ruud Lubbers when he became Prime Minister in 1982; before that it was used by the Minister of the Interior as the main office. Since 1982 it has been in continuous use as office of the prime minister and has achieved symbolic status in the Netherlands (the office will be relocated during the large-scale renovation of the 800-year-old complex).

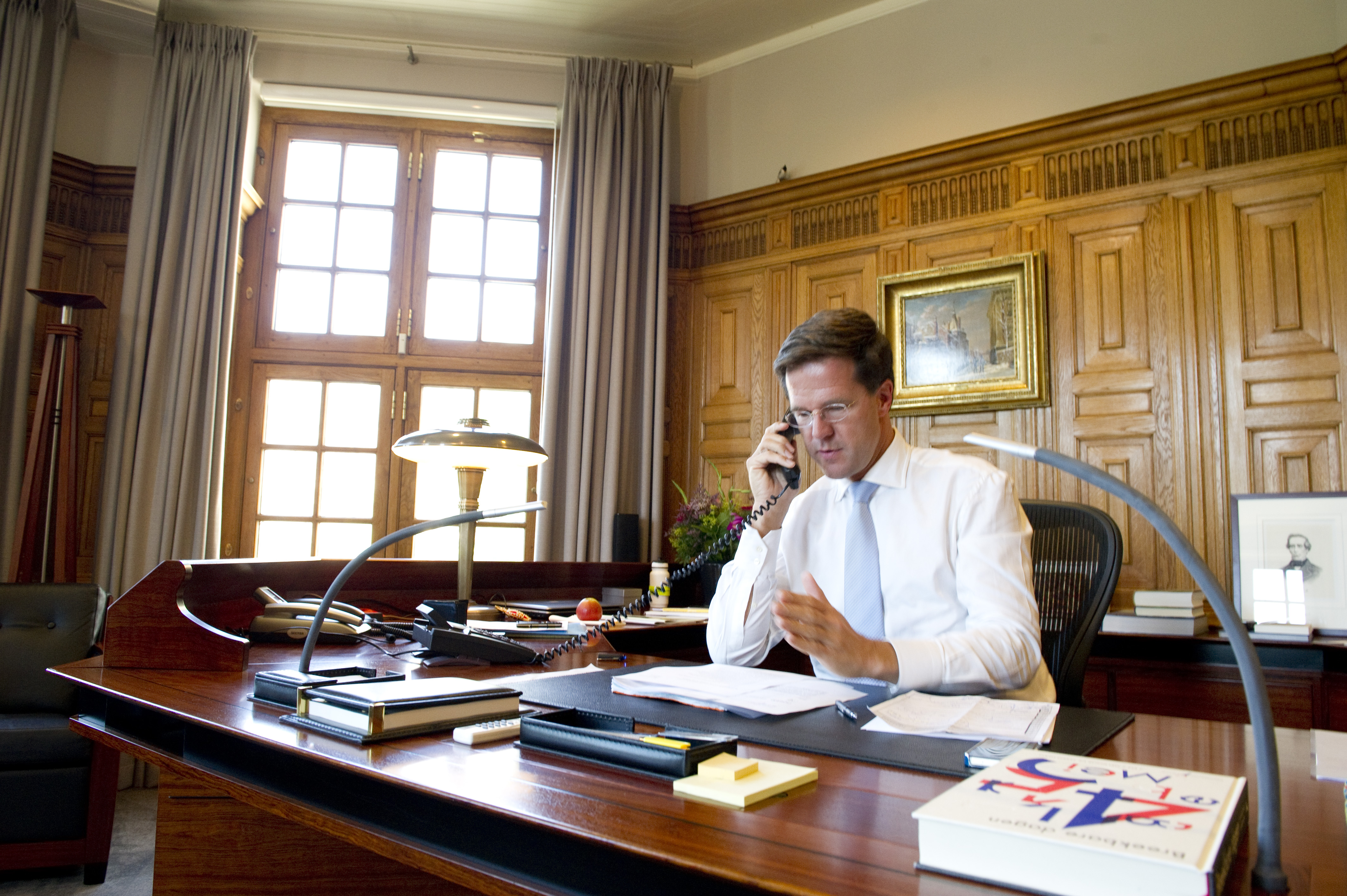
Interior
Mark Rutte at his desk in 2012

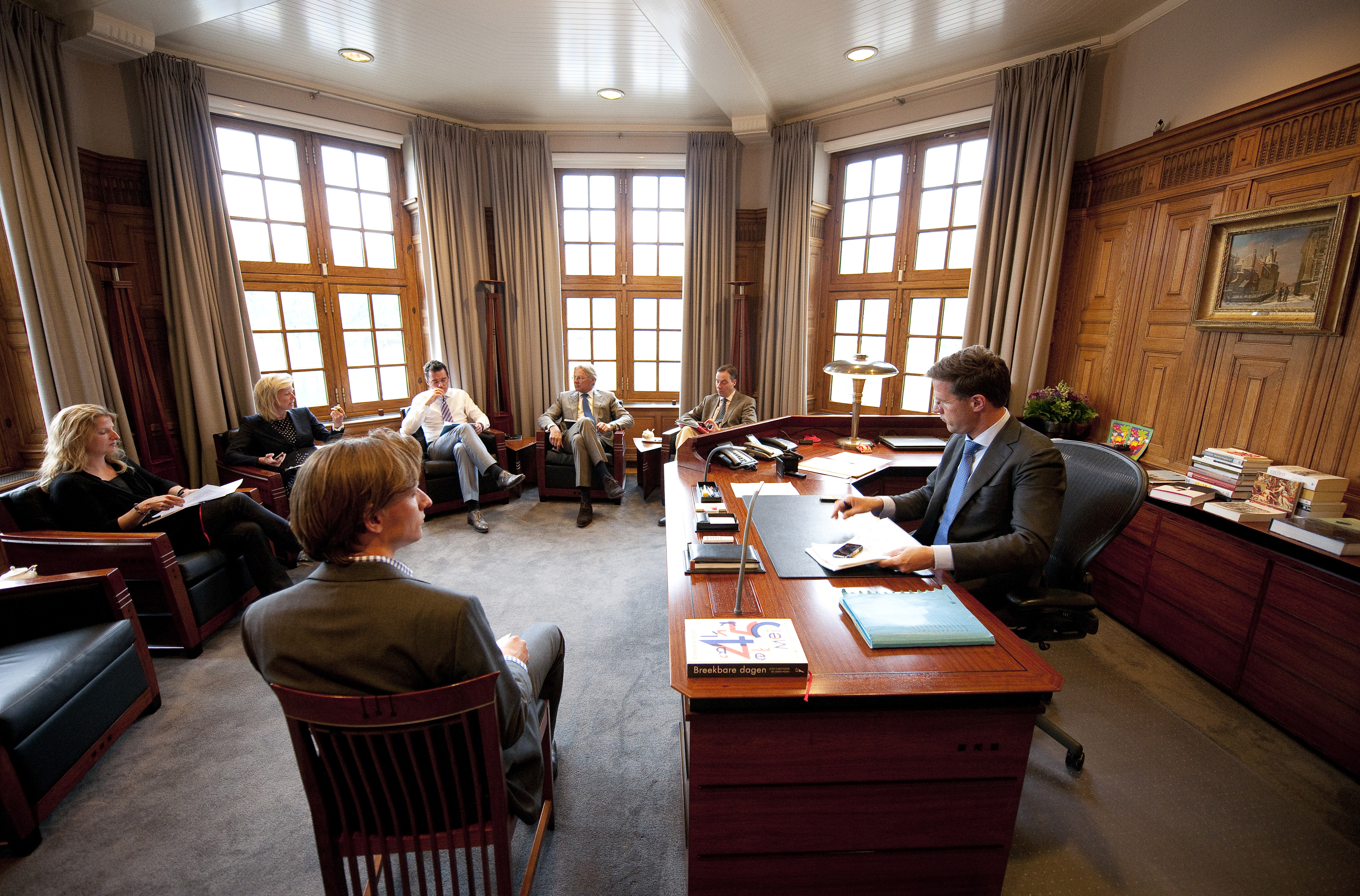
Interior
Mark Rutte and staff in 2012

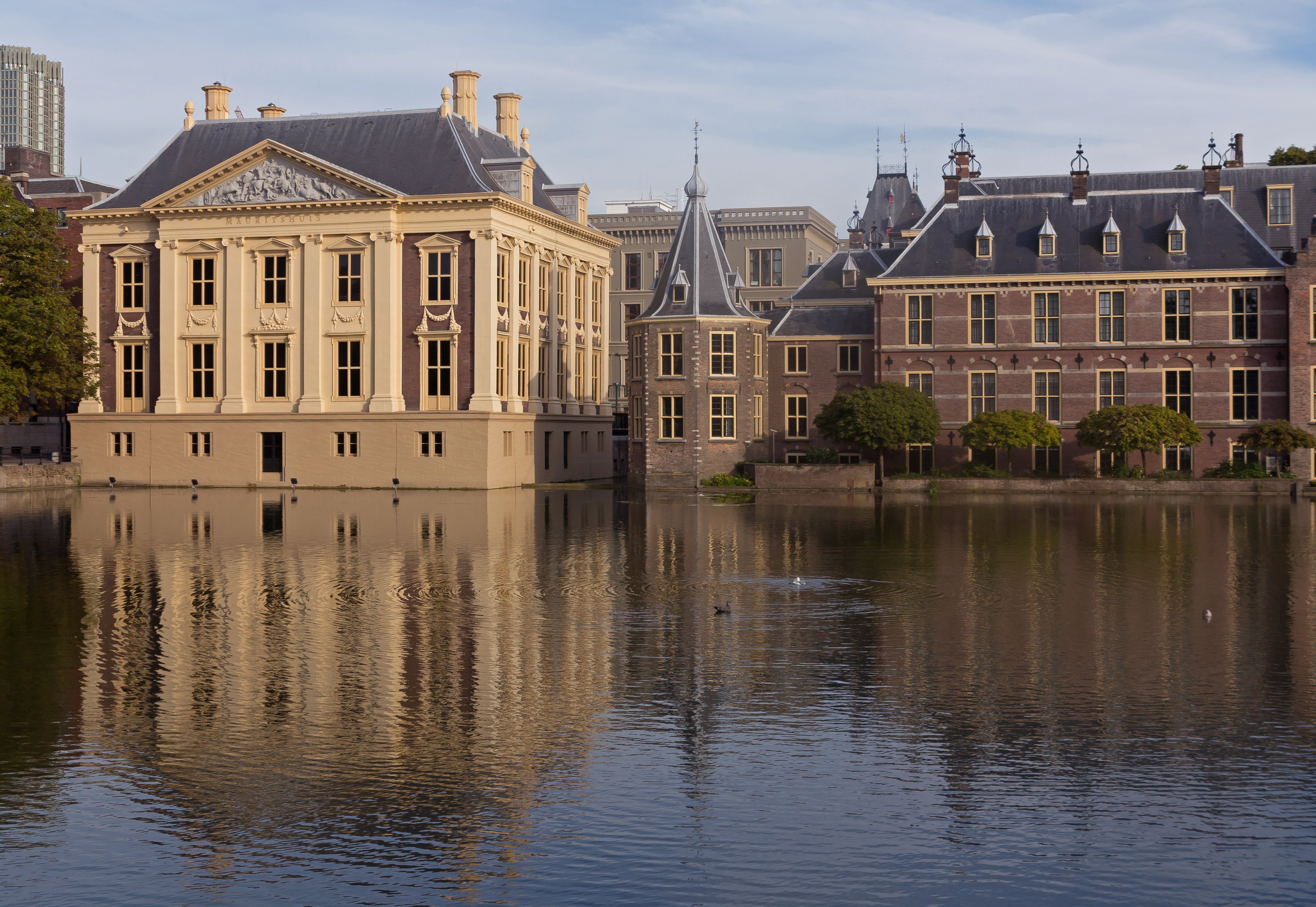
Exterior
seen from the Hofvijver in 2015

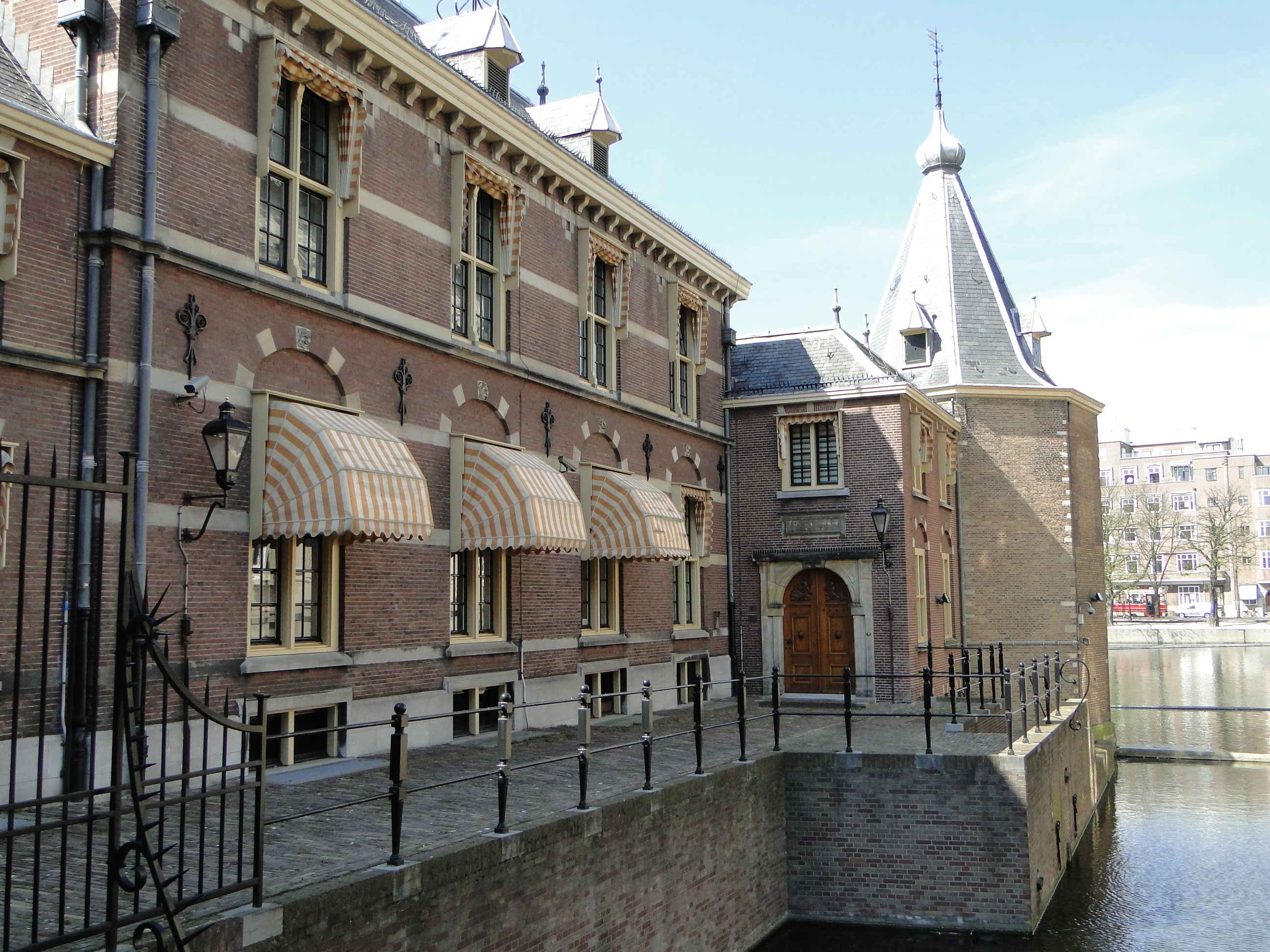
Exterior
seen from the Binnenhof in 2012

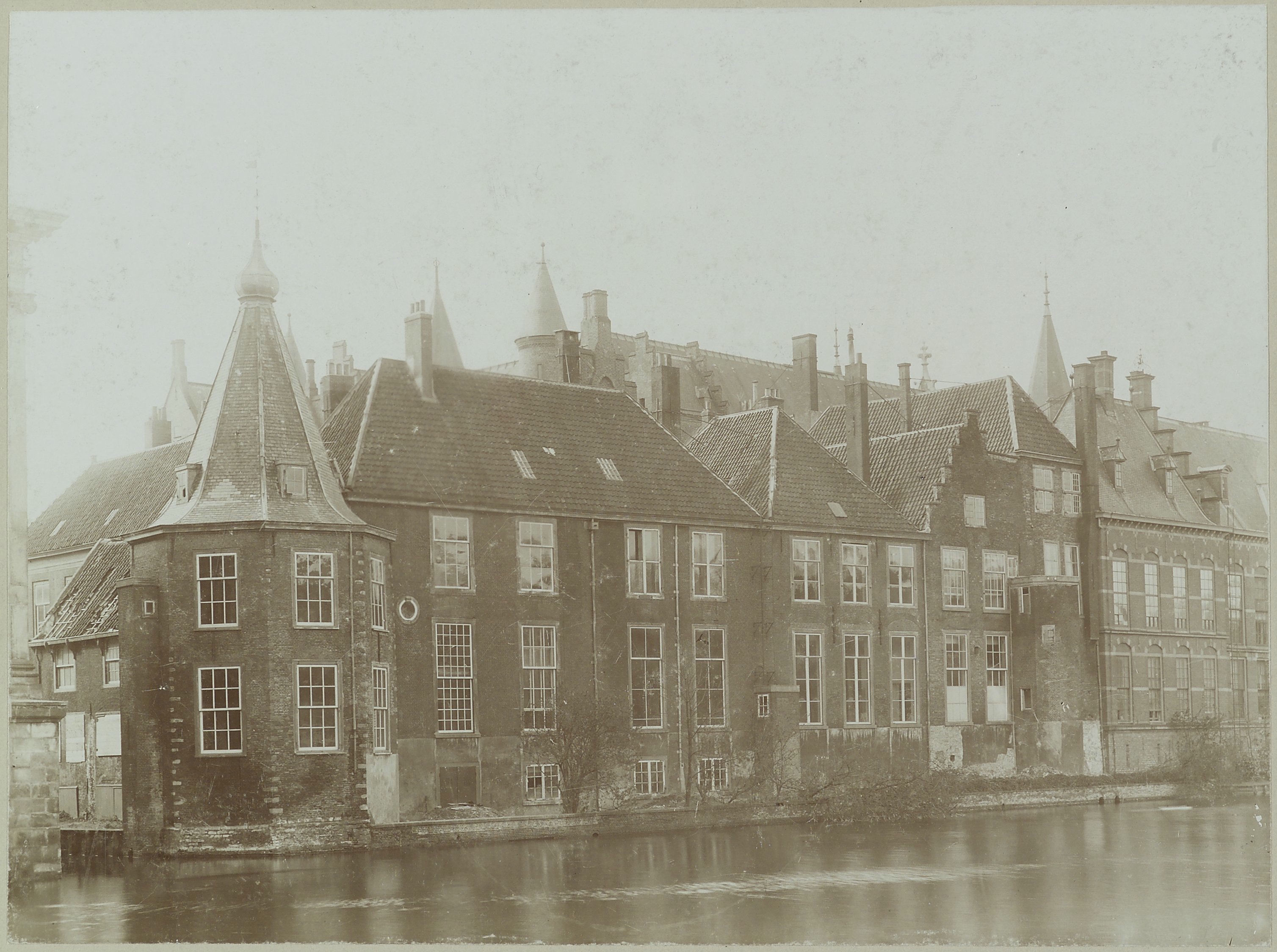
Exterior
seen from the Hofvijver in 1913
