= Hofvijver =

Lake in The Hague, Netherlands

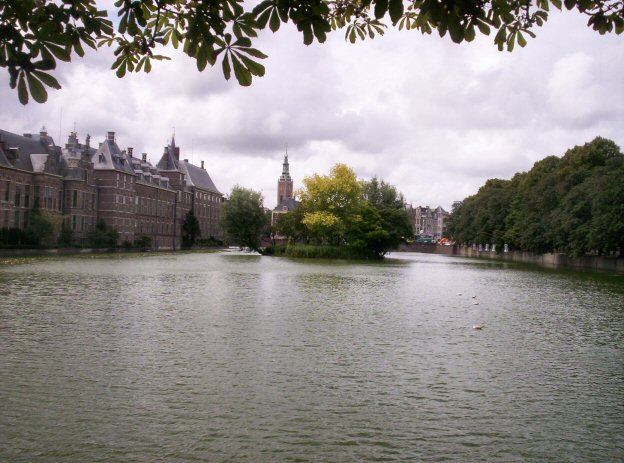
- View from the Hague historical museum on the Korte Vijverberg

- Location within South Holland
- Location: The Hague, Netherlands
- Coordinates: 52°04′48.78″N 4°18′42.37″E

The Hofvijver (Dutch pronunciation: [ˈɦɔˌfɛivər]; English: Court Pond) is a small lake in the centre of The Hague, Netherlands. its water volume approximately is 32000 m³ ( 26 ac ft ) It is adjoined in the east by the Korte Vijverberg road, in the south by the Binnenhof and the Mauritshuis, in the west by the Buitenhof and in the north by the Lange Vijverberg road. In the middle there is an islet with plants and trees which has no name; it is usually referred to as "the island in the Vijverberg".

== History ==
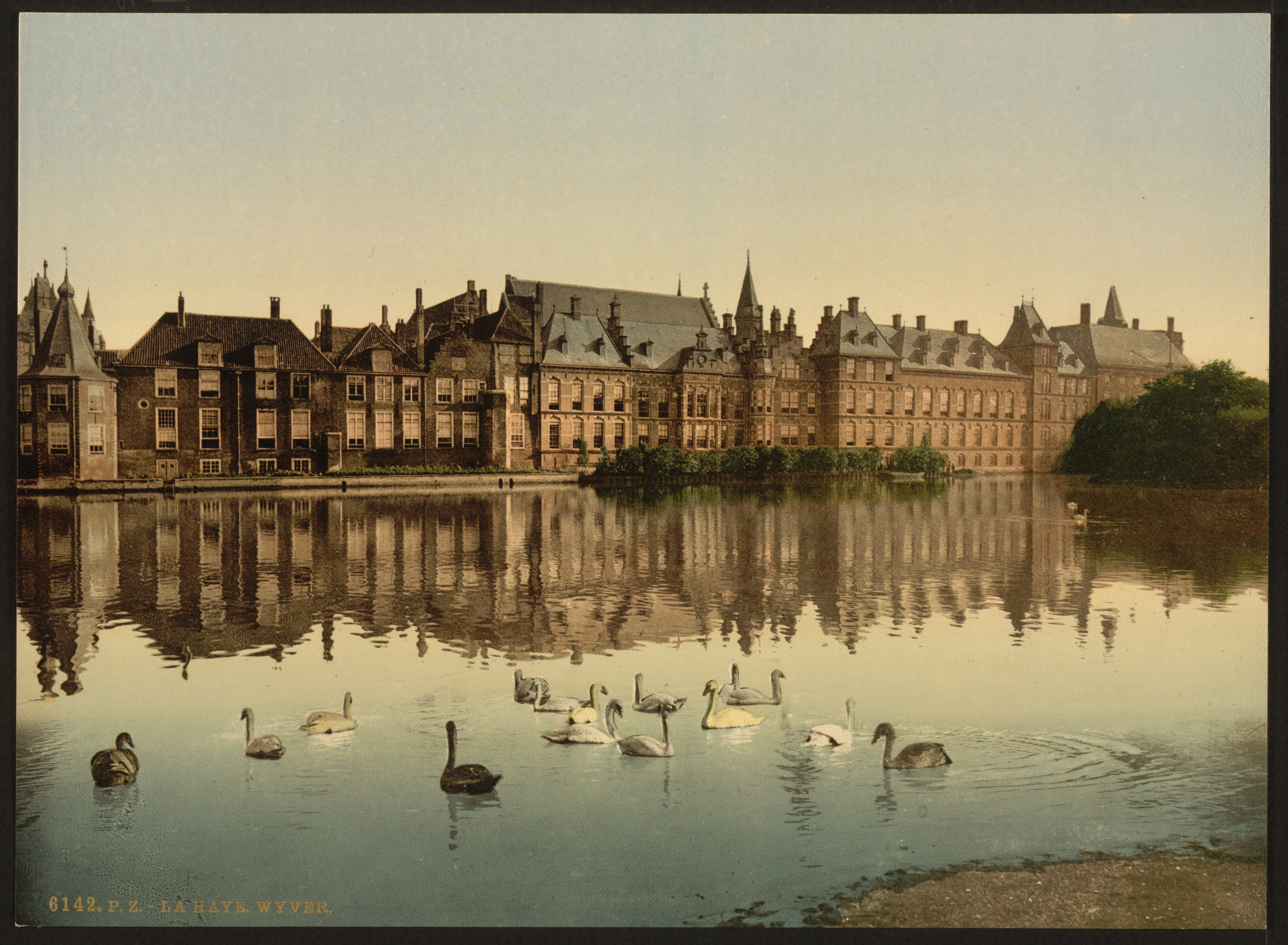
View of the Binnenhof across the hofvijver from the Lange Vijverberg in 1900

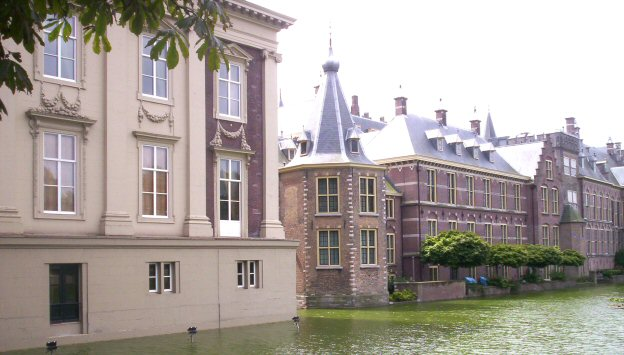
View from the Korte Vijverberg of the west side of the Mauritshuis museum, the little tower or Torentje, and the north part of the Binnenhof along the east side of the Hofvijver

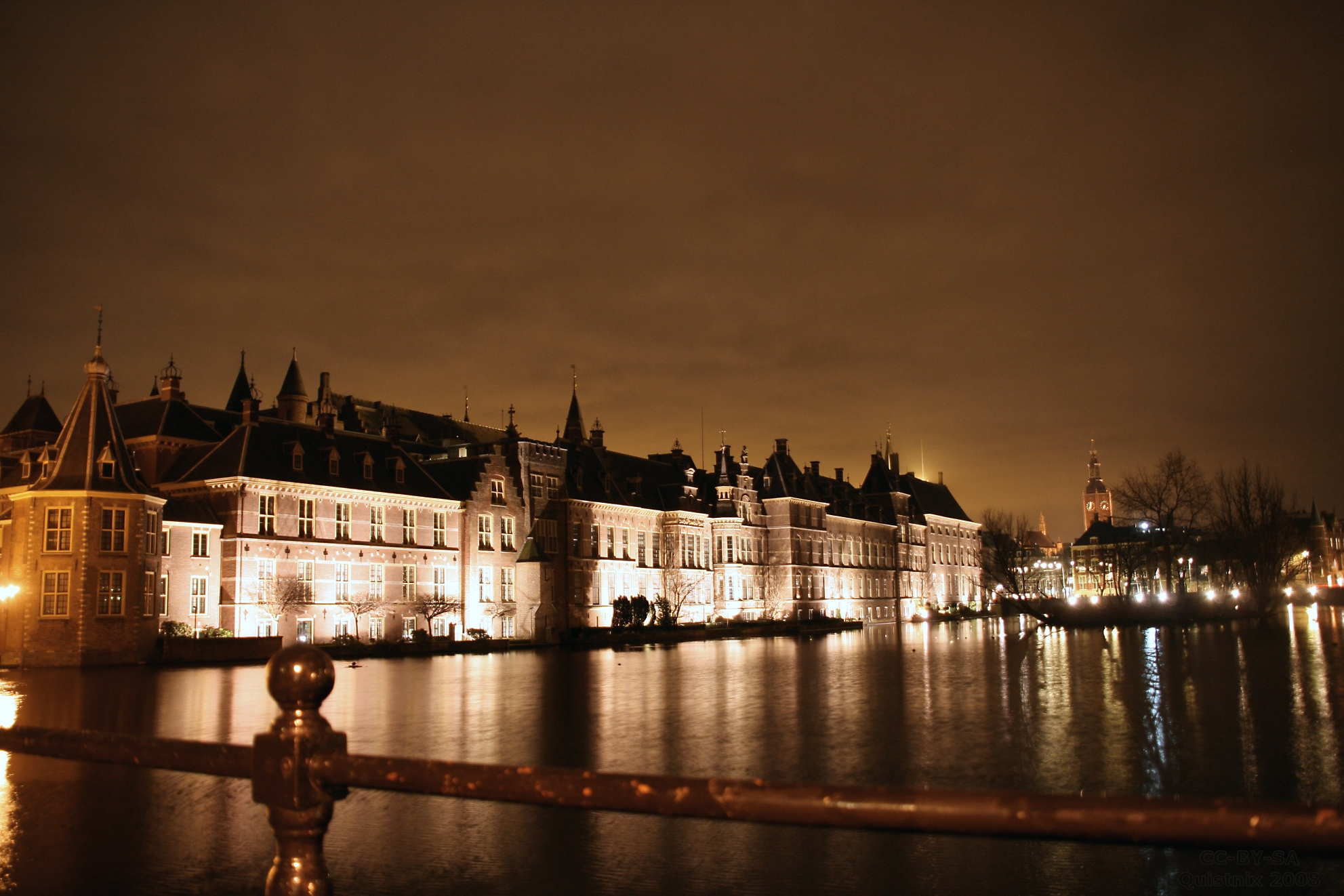
Similar view from the Korte Vijverberg by night

The term "pond" is actually a misnomer, as the Hofvijver has its origin in a natural dune lake fed by the Haagse Beek (Hague Creek, originally Dunecreek) and the, nowadays muted, Bosbeek (Forestcreek) from the Haagse Bos (Hague Forest). The Haagse Beek still feeds the Hofvijver and so the pond is directly connected to the dunes in Kijkduin.

In this dune lake there was an island (not the current island in the Hofvijver) on which Willem II built his palace in 1248. Other sources say he built his palace alongside the pond and created a moat around it. The city of The Hague celebrated its 700 years of existence in 1948, suggesting that the city itself bases its origin on the building of the palace by Willem II in 1248.

Count Albert decided on the rectangular shape in the 14th century. In the 17th century quays were constructed, and in the 19th century the pond was elongated. Up to around 1800 the Binnenhof was still encircled by a moat and was only accessible by bridges.

The island in the Vijverberg, as known in its present form, was only created around 300 years ago. How or why it was created is unknown. In the centre of the island stands a flagpole and the island itself counts a number of trees and small plants. It is not open to the public. Alongside the island there is a fountain set in the water. On a number of demonstrations the island has been occupied, and there have been banners displayed on the island.

== Present ==
Nowadays the Hofvijver is adjoined in the west by the Buitenhof, but until the 19th century that side was adjoined by houses. The pond is encircled by fairly high quays, but is very shallow on some points. In 2004 an underwater gate was built to make sure that nobody could swim to the prime minister's office without being detected. His office, the Torentje ("Little Tower"), adjoins the Hofvijver as it is located on the Binnenhof.

On the bank across from the Binnenhof (Lange Vijverberg) there is a statue of Jantje (Little John) pointing to the Binnenhof. "Jantje" probably refers to John I, Count of Holland who died at the age of 15 years, and features in a well known Dutch children's song about The Hague.

Located next to the Vijverberg are several museums, like the Mauritshuis, the Gevangenpoort (Prison Gate), the Hague Historical Museum and the Gallery Prince William V.
