= Buitenhof (The Hague) =

Square in The Hague, Netherlands

Coordinates: 52.0789°N 4.3107°E

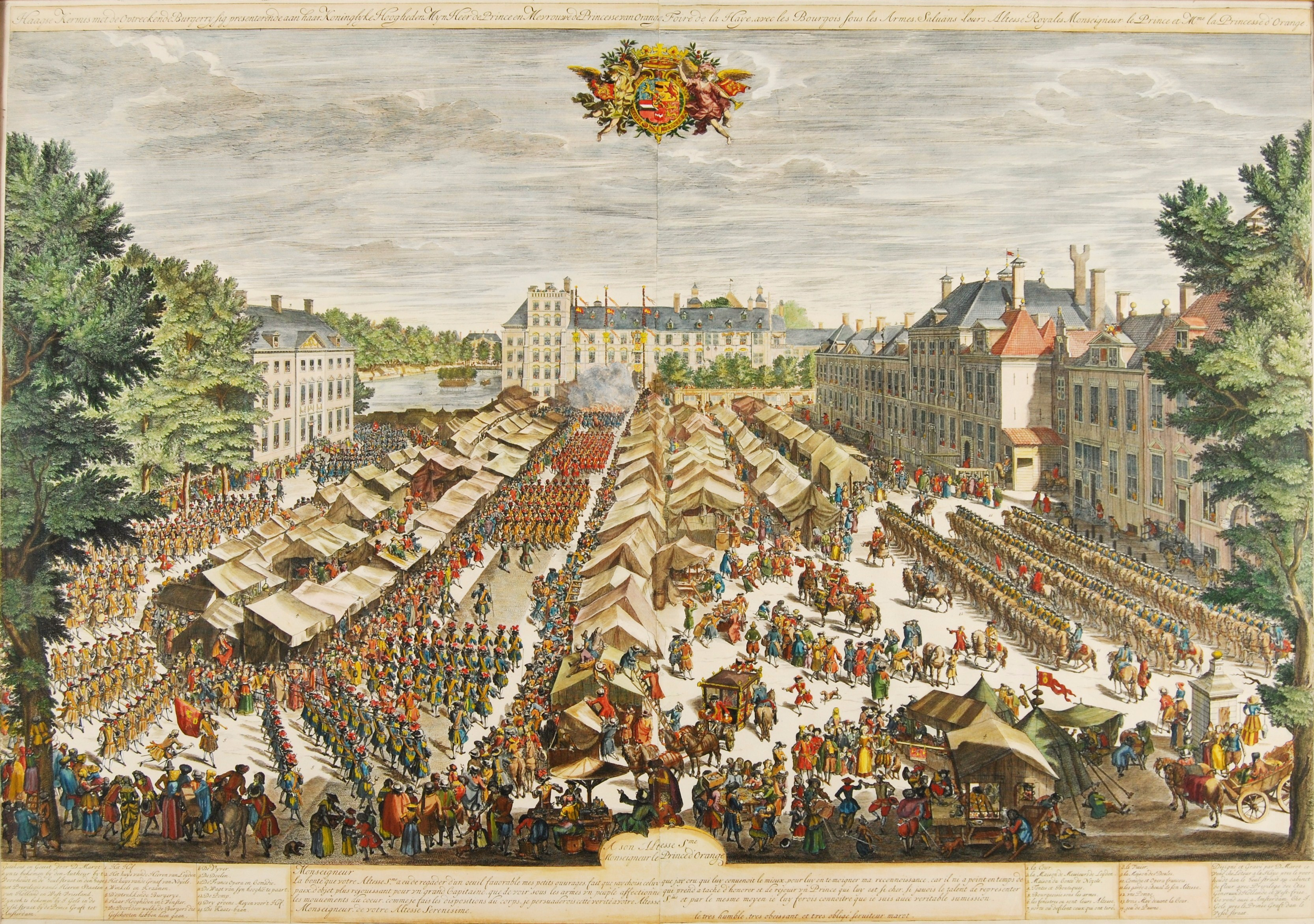
Fair on the Buitenhof in 1686.

The Buitenhof (Dutch: [ˈbœytə(n)ˌɦɔf], The Hague dialect: [ˈbœːtəˌɦɔf]; English: Outer Court) is a square in The Hague, Netherlands, adjacent to the Binnenhof (Inner Court) and the Hofvijver (Court Pond). It is listed in the Top 100 Dutch heritage sites.

== History ==
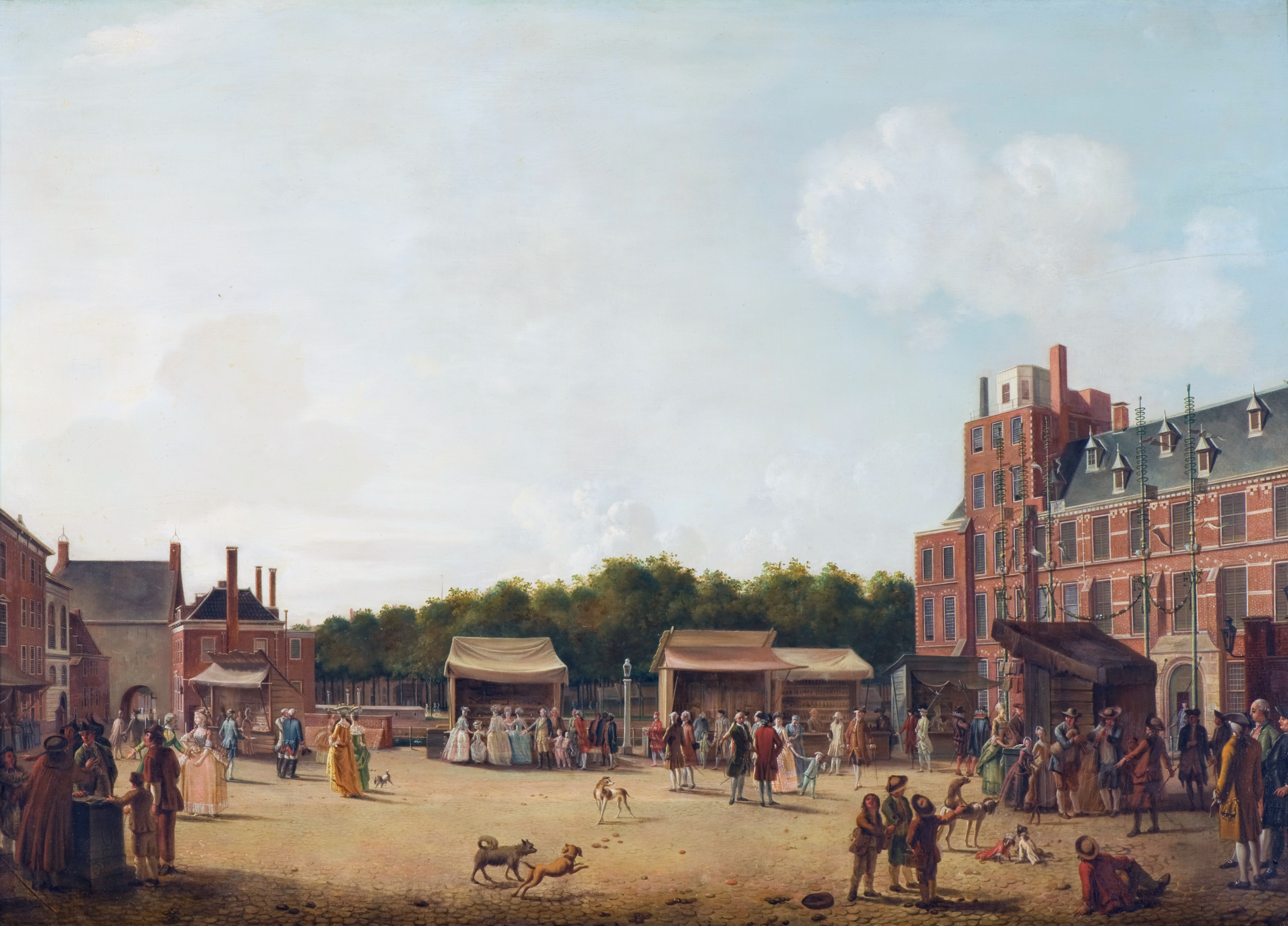
William V, Prince of Orange and his family visit the Buitenhof in 1781.

The square originated in the 13th century, during the construction of the Binnenhof. It was filled with houses and stables and, in the reign of Count Albert I, it even featured a zoo. The zoo exhibited mostly falcons and other birds of prey that were used for hunting. Later, hounds were exhibited as well. The Buitenhof was moated for safety in the 15th century. People that did not belong to the court, lived outside of it, around the Plaats and the Korte Voorhout, and along the Hofvijver. The only entrance to the square was the Gevangenpoort, Prison Gate. A second entrance was introduced in 1814 with the construction of the Gravenstraat. In 1923, the houses between the gate and the Hofvijver were demolished, as was advised by architect Hendrik Petrus Berlage. This created more space for the increasing traffic, which had had to pass the gate before.

== Important buildings ==
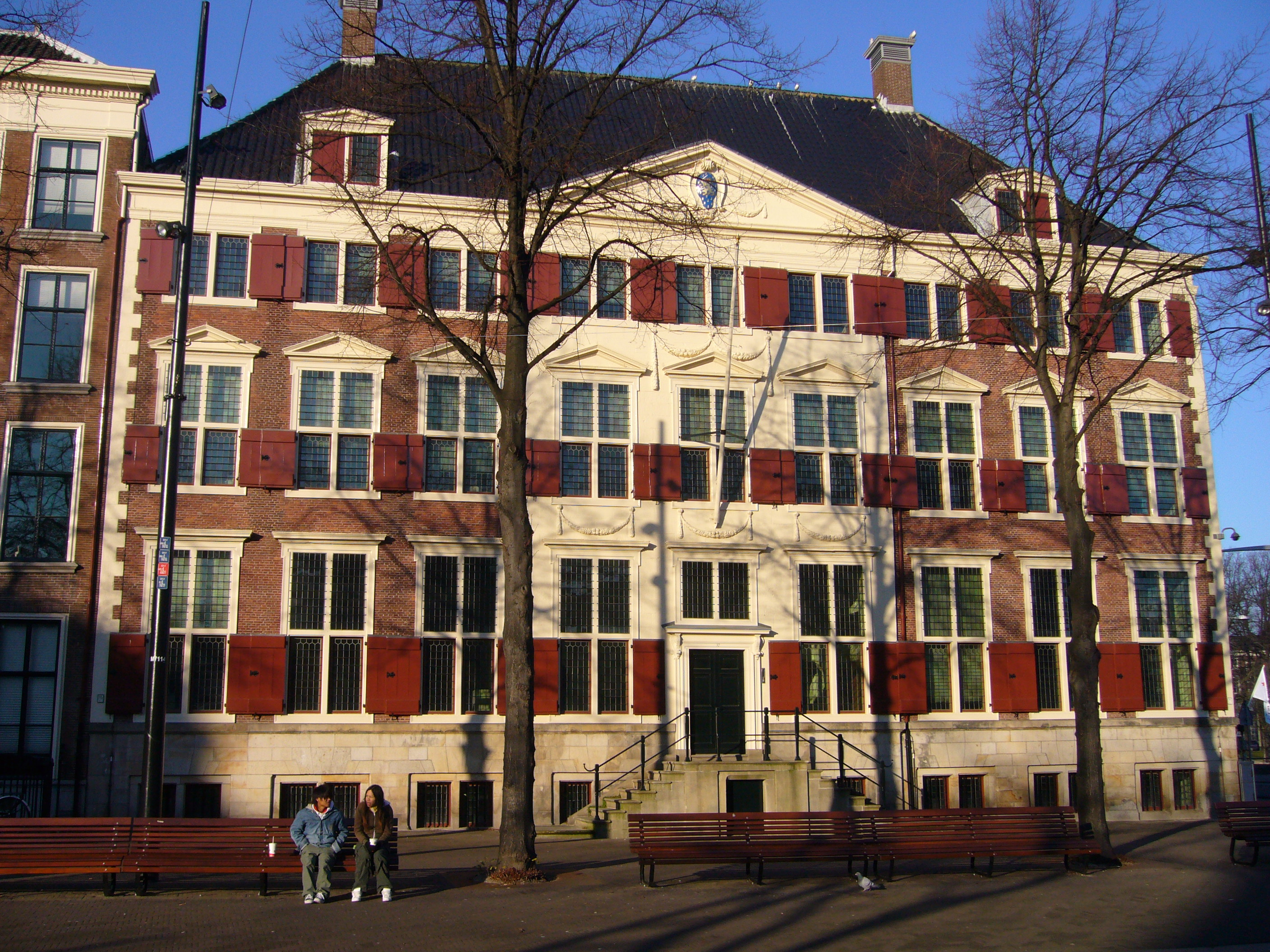
The Vijverhof, number 37.

- Number 19 was built in the second half of the 18th century as the main office of the garrison. It was renovated from 1897 to 1900, after which it became a police office. The building currently houses a restaurant.
- Number 20 was built in 1904 as a restaurant, named "Entre Deux Villes". In 1935, the building became a Cineac movie theatre, which later became a Pathé movie theatre.
- Number 22 is the Besognekamer, today a bridge society. The ground floor is occupied by a McDonald's.
- Number 33 is the Gevangenpoort, which was used as a prison from 1420 to 1828.
- Number 34 was built in 1467. In the 19th century, it was used as parking place of carriages of the court, until they were replaced to the Royal Stables in 1877.
- Number 37 is known as Vijverhof today. It was rebuilt by De Lussanet de la Sablonière in 1972, and renovated again in 2005-2007. The building is used as an annex of the House of Representatives.
- Number 38 is since 1872 the Cadastre.
- Number 39-42 are three 17th-century houses, today housing the four-star Hotel Corona.
