= Prime Minister of the Netherlands =

Head of government

- Minister-president van Nederland
- Coat of arms of the Netherlands

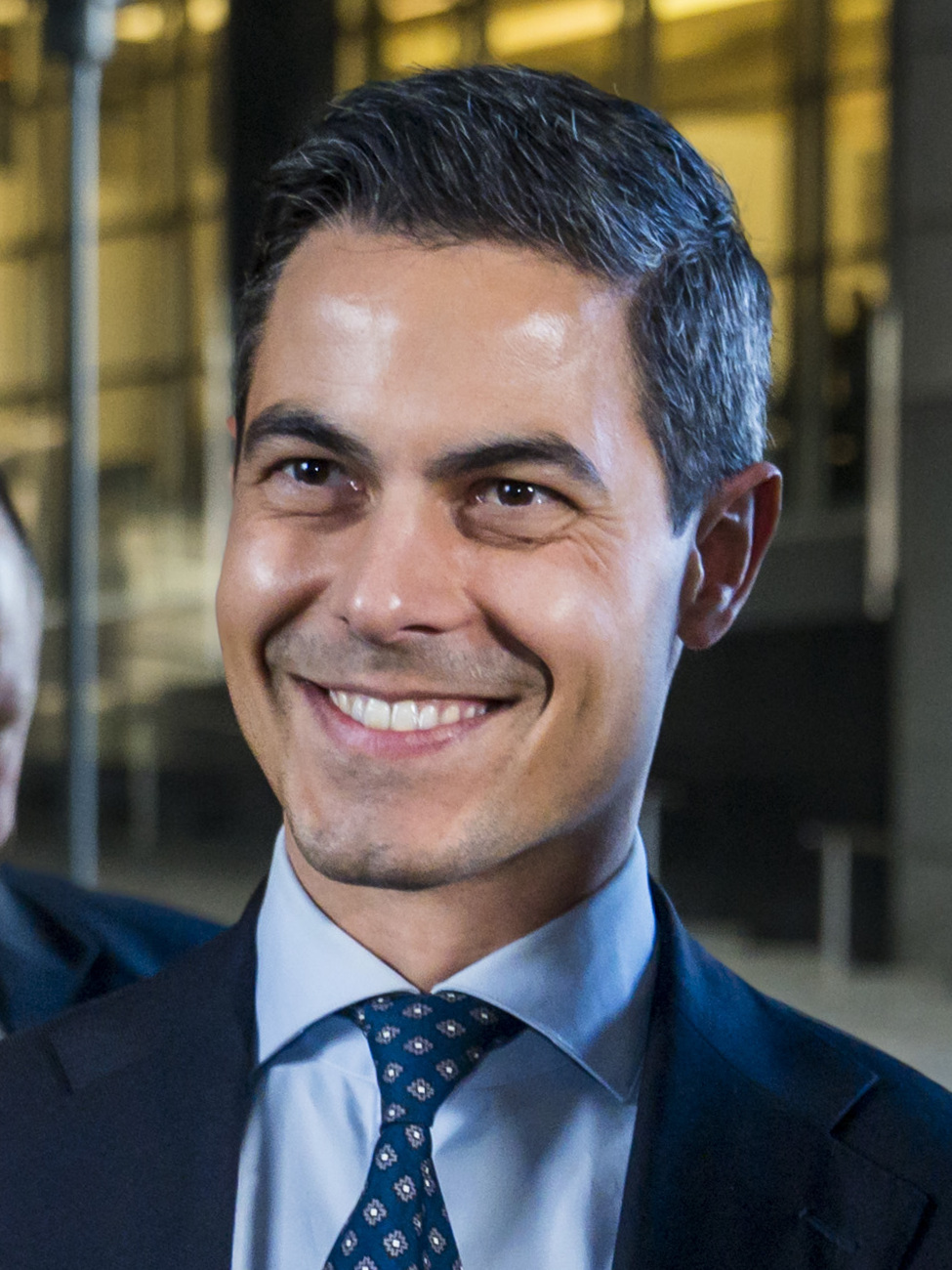
- Incumbent; Rob Jetten since February 23, 2026
- Ministry of General Affairs
- Type: Head of government
- Status: Prime ministeral government position
- Member of: Council of Ministers; European Council
- Residence: Catshuis, The Hague
- Seat: Torentje, The Hague
- Appointer: Monarch of the Netherlands
- Term length: Four years, renewable
- Inaugural holder: Gerrit Schimmelpenninck
- Formation: 25 March 1848; 178 years ago
- Deputy: Deputy Prime Minister
- Salary: €205,991 (As of 2025)

The prime minister of the Netherlands (Dutch: Minister-president van Nederland) or, before 1945, the chairman of the Council of Ministers (Dutch: voorzitter van de ministerraad) is the head of government of the Netherlands. While the monarch is formally the head of state, they are a constitutional monarch, so the prime minister occupies this role as chair of the Council of Ministers, coordinating its policy with the rest of the cabinet. The prime minister also represents the Netherlands in the European Council, participating in deliberations that define the European Union's overall political direction. Rob Jetten is the current prime minister since 23 February 2026.

== History ==
Gradually the prime minister became an official function of government leader, taken by the political leader of the largest party. Since 1848, the role of the first minister has been relevant. In that year the Constitution of the Netherlands was amended to make ministers responsible to the States General and no longer responsible to the king, who acted as the leader of the cabinet. Until 1901, the position of chair of the Council of Ministers officially rotated between ministers. Between 1901 and 1945, the position formally still rotated, but prominent politicians could claim a rotation period of four years.

In 1937, a separate Ministry of General Affairs was instituted, which was informally linked to the prime minister. Barend Biesheuvel (1971–1973) was the last prime minister who was not the political leader of the largest party in cabinet (his party was in fact the third largest), until the appointment of Dick Schoof (2024–2026), an independent politician chosen to lead a right-wing coalition. In 1983, the function of prime minister was laid down in the constitution.

Since then, the prime minister's formal title has been "minister-president." In keeping with longstanding practice for heads of government in English-speaking parliamentary regimes, the title is almost always back-translated as "prime minister".

The position of the prime minister has been reinforced by the creation of the European Council. In November 2006, the rules of procedure of the Council of Ministers were changed to allow the prime minister to put any item on the agenda of the council and no longer have to wait for a minister to take the initiative. A change of the rules of procedure of the cabinet in July 2008 allowed the prime minister to manage costs of the Royal House across departments, to make one department in control of costs of the Royal House which are covered by several ministries.

== Role ==
The prime minister is the leading political figure and holder of the de facto highest office in the Netherlands. In terms of political power, however, the prime minister is not as powerful as, for example, the British prime minister or the German chancellor. This is mainly because, historically, all Dutch ministers used to be responsible to the monarch (also true of prime ministers in other countries); ministers took turns to fill the position of prime minister, and in the role had little if any control over the other ministers. The prime minister's role gained importance when ministers became responsible to the parliament, and the position became mostly reserved for the leader of the biggest political party in the House of Representatives. Still, because the position holds limited powers compared to its equivalent in other neighboring parliamentary democracies, the prime minister's role is described as primus inter pares ("first among equals"), and he is as much the chairman of the government as he is its leader.

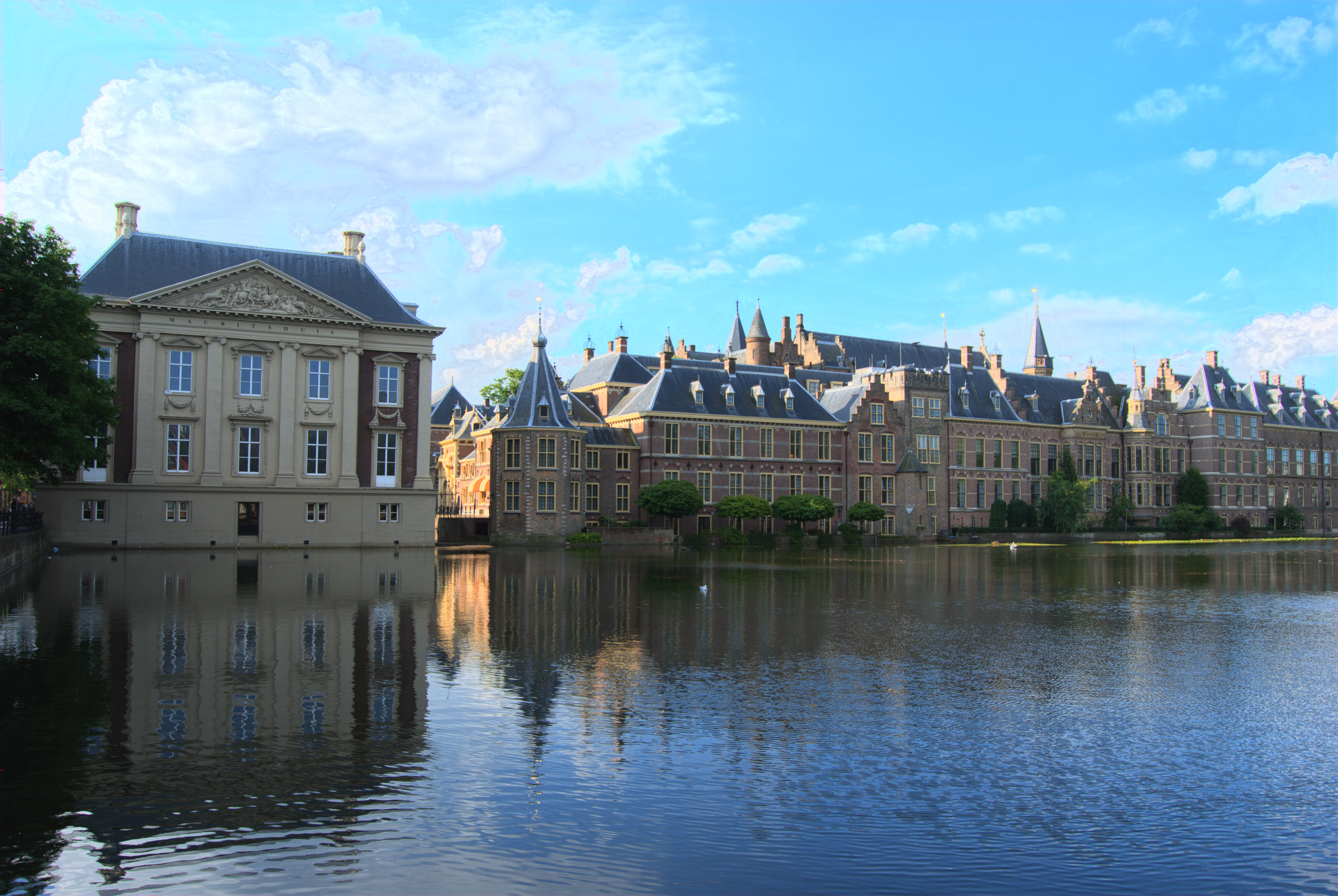
The Ministry of General Affairs at the Binnenhof in The Hague. The office of the prime minister, "Het Torentje", is the centre-left octagonal tower.

Following the constitutional review of 1983, the position of prime minister was formalised in the Dutch Constitution for the first time. According to the Constitution of the Netherlands, the Government is constituted by the king and the ministers. The Constitution stipulates that the prime minister chairs the Council of Ministers (article 45) and is appointed by royal decree (article 43). The royal decree of their own appointment and those of the other ministers are to be countersigned by the prime minister (article 48). The Council of Ministers is no longer attended by the king.

The prime minister chairs the weekly meetings of the Council of Ministers and has the power to set the agenda of these meetings. The prime minister is also Minister of General Affairs (Minister van Algemene Zaken), which takes an important role in coordinating policy and is responsible for the Government Information Service.

The prime minister is also responsible for the royal house and has a weekly meeting with the king on government policy. Informally the prime minister functions as the "face" of the cabinet to the public. After the meetings of the cabinet on Friday, the prime minister hosts a press conference on the decisions of the cabinet and current affairs. The prime minister also has some functions in international affairs, attending the European Council every six months and maintaining bilateral contacts. The prime minister's office has since the 1980s been an octagonal tower, named "The Little Tower" (Torentje), in the Binnenhof in The Hague. The official residence (which is only used for official functions) is the Catshuis; the last prime minister to live in the Catshuis was Dries van Agt.

Although prime ministers are almost always the political leader of their party and as such chosen as a member of the House of Representatives, they (and other ministers who were chosen as representative) are required to give up their seat for the duration of their tenure, as Dutch ministers are not allowed to be members of parliament.

=== Appointment ===
The Dutch electoral system makes it all but impossible for one party to win an outright majority in the House of Representatives; no party has done so since 1900. Hence, Dutch governments are always coalitions between two or more parties. Following the most recent elections, the House appointed a "scout" to seek advice on how to interpret the election results (a role coordinated by the monarch prior to 2012). On the basis of this advice, the House appoints an informateur to check on prospective coalitions and lead negotiations between potential partners. If successful, the House then appoints a formateur, who concludes the talks between the members of the prospective coalition. The formateur is almost always the de facto prime minister-designate.

=== Deputies ===
The king appoints deputy prime ministers. Conventionally, all of the junior partners in the coalition get one deputy prime minister; they are ranked according to the size of their respective parties in the House of Representatives. The senior deputy prime minister chairs the cabinet meeting when the prime minister is not present. In the Jetten cabinet, Dilan Yeşilgöz chairs those meetings as first deputy prime minister of the Netherlands, with the other deputy being Bart van den Brink. The oldest member of the cabinet chairs the meeting when the prime minister and all deputies are absent; since the establishment of the Jetten cabinet in February 2026, the oldest member is Hans Vijlbrief, the minister of Social Affairs and Employment.

=== Kingdom of the Netherlands ===
The prime minister is also chairman of the Council of Ministers of the Kingdom of the Netherlands, and therefore also deals with matters affecting the other countries Aruba, Curaçao, and Sint Maarten in the kingdom. The independent cabinets of Aruba, Curaçao, and Sint Maarten also have their own prime ministers: Mike Eman (Prime Minister of Aruba), Gilmar Pisas (Prime Minister of Curaçao), and Luc Mercelina (Prime Minister of Sint Maarten). The Council of Ministers of the Kingdom of the Netherlands includes ministers plenipotentiary from the other countries of the kingdom. These are not included in the government of the kingdom.

== See also ==
- List of prime ministers of the Netherlands
- Historical rankings of prime ministers of the Netherlands
- Religious affiliations of prime ministers of the Netherlands
