= Binnenhof =

Complex of government buildings in The Hague, Netherlands

Coordinates: 52.079631°N 4.313035°E

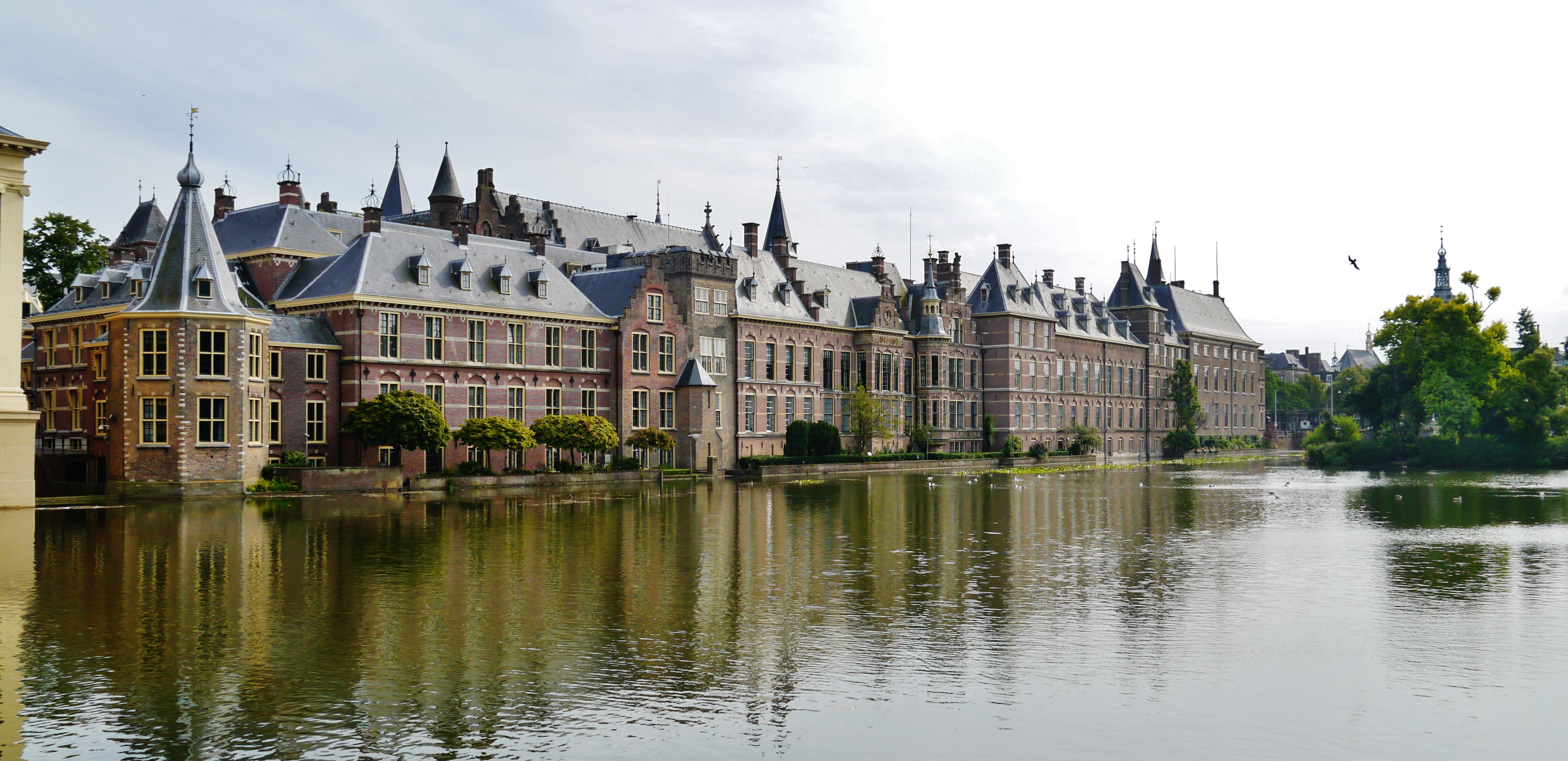
The Hague's Binnenhof with the Hofvijver (Court Pond)

The Binnenhof (Dutch pronunciation: [ˈbɪnə(n)ˌɦɔf]; English: Inner Court) is a complex of buildings in the city centre of The Hague, Netherlands, next to the Hofvijver (Court Pond). It houses the meeting place of both houses of the States General of the Netherlands, as well as the Ministry of General Affairs and the office of the prime minister of the Netherlands. Built primarily in the 13th century, the Gothic castle originally functioned as residence of the counts of Holland and became the political centre of the Dutch Republic in 1584. Together with the Buitenhof it is ranked among the Top 100 Dutch heritage sites. The Binnenhof is the oldest parliament building in the world still in use.

== History ==
=== Comital period ===
==== Counts of Holland ====
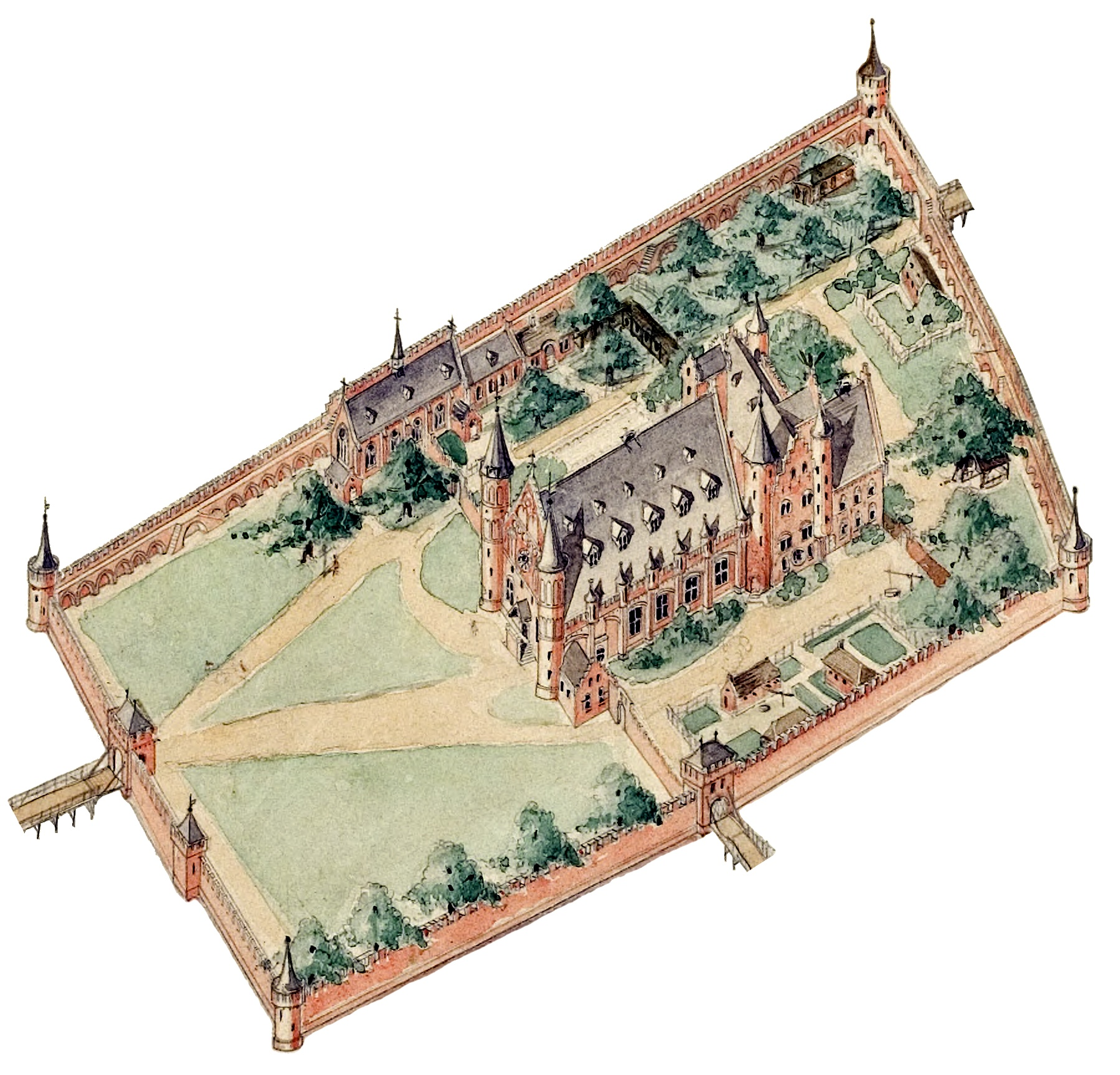
Reconstruction of the Binnenhof in ca. 1280

Little is known about the origin of the Binnenhof. Count of Holland Floris IV purchased the grounds of the Binnenhof in 1229 from Dirk van Wassenaer and built a hunting lodge. Despite Floris IV's purchase, his successor William II is often credited with the foundation of the Binnenhof, after he became King of the Romans in 1248. Presumably, he started the building of the Ridderzaal, a great hall where the Count could receive guests. The Ridderzaal was finished under the reign of Floris V, during which the buildings were also walled in, including a gate, and the Hofkapel was built. The Binnenhof was separated in a public part, which included the Ridderzaal, and a private area for residence and private meetings (now part of the Rolgebouw).

==== Counts of Hainaut ====
After the House of Holland died out in 1299, the county fell into the hands of the counts of Hainaut (Dutch: Henegouwen). The counts of Hainaut barely resided in the Binnenhof in the early 14th century and the only addition was the De Lairesse building (which included the De Lairessezaal).

==== Dukes of Bavaria ====
The Binnenhof came to life again and was expanded when it came into the hands of the dukes of Bavaria. Albert I (r. 1358–1404) was the first to more or less permanently use the Binnenhof as primary residence. He also incentivised the town of The Hague to grow near the Binnenhof. After Albert I's reign, the ongoing Hook and Cod wars caused his successors William II and Jacqueline to stay less and less in the limited defensible Binnenhof, leading to a decay in importance and building activity.

==== Duchy of Burgundy ====
The Treaty of Delft in 1428 brought peace to Holland, but also incorporated the county into the Duchy of Burgundy. The Duke of Burgundy visited the Binnenhof infrequently. As a result, following Jacqueline's death, the private area of the Binnenhof remained unoccupied. In the public area, the Duke's representative in Holland, the stadtholder of Holland, utilised the offices. A new quarter was constructed on the far-west side of the Binnenhof for the stadtholders and their families. The Duke or stadtholder also met with the States of Holland and West Friesland in the council chamber of the ridderhuis. Beginning in the mid-15th century, the Hof van Holland and Grafelijkheidsrekenkamer were also housed at the Binnenhof.

=== Dutch Republic ===
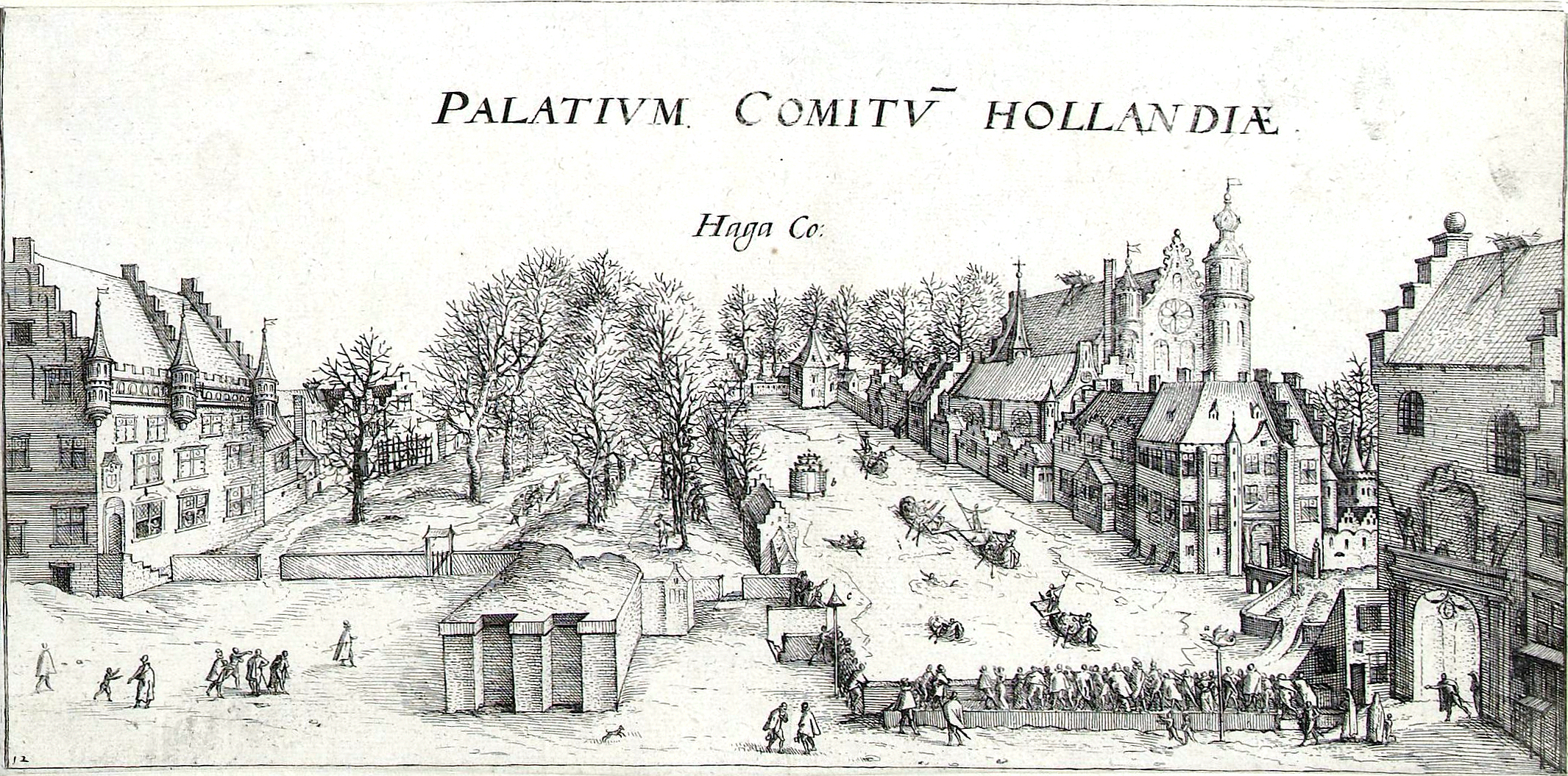
The Binnenhof in 1586

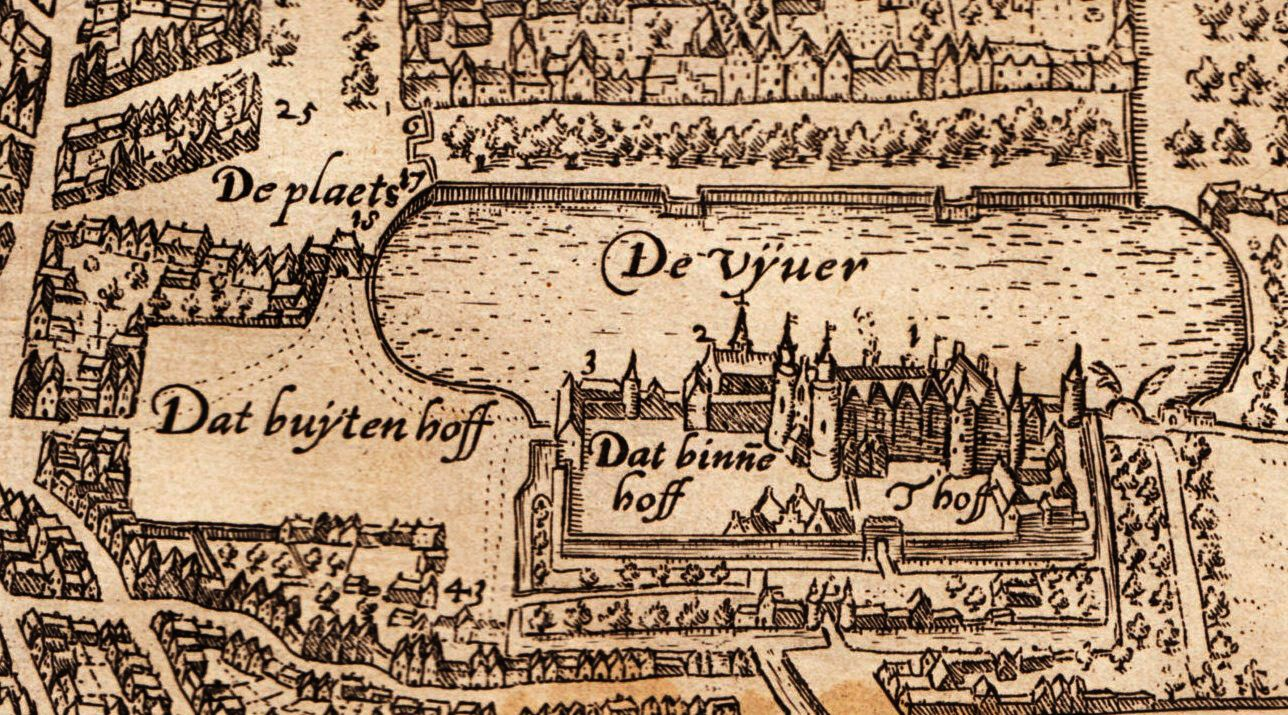
The Binnenhof and Hofvijver on a map of The Hague from around 1600

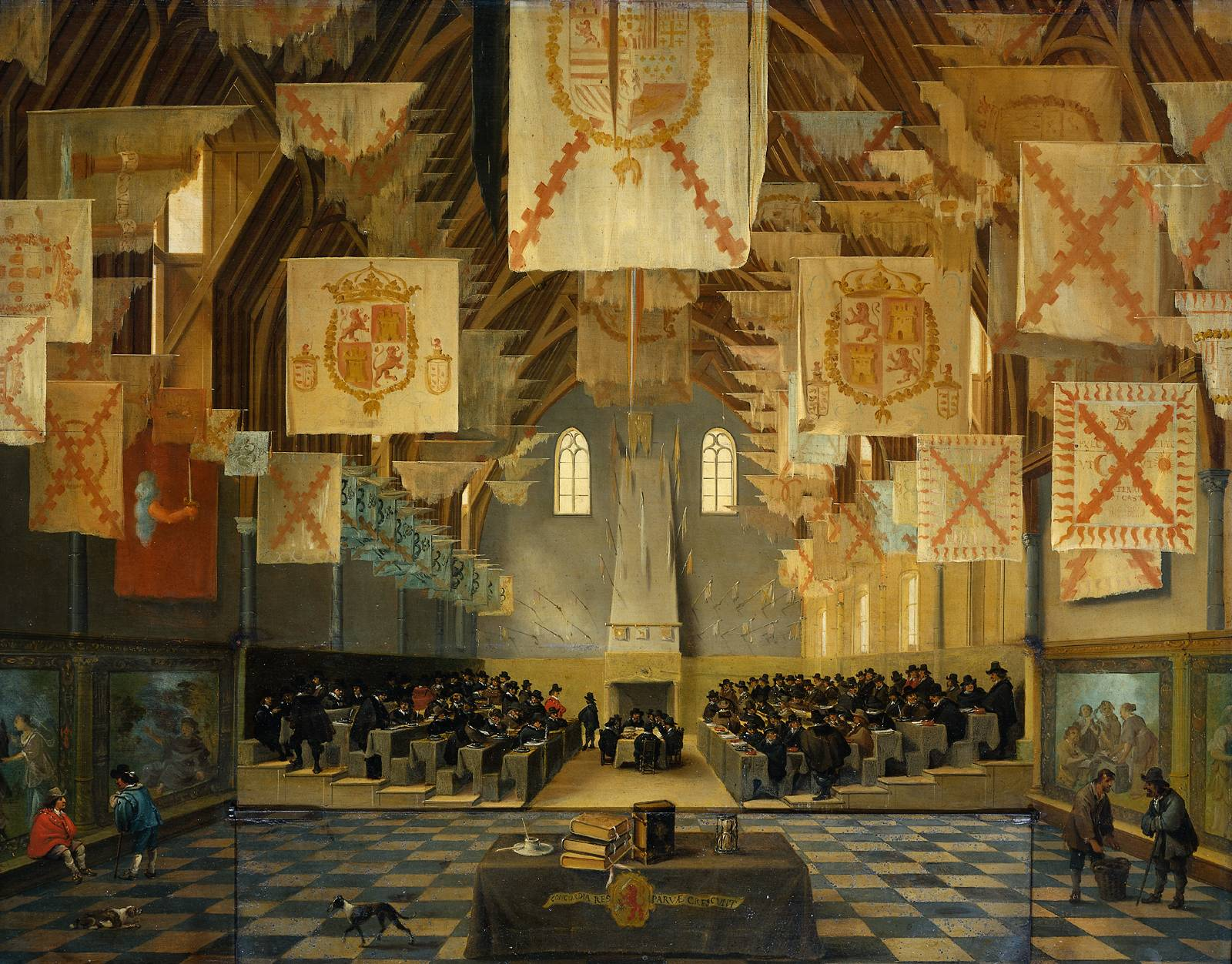
A meeting of the States General of the Dutch Republic in the Ridderzaal in 1651

After Philip II was deposed as Count of Holland and the Dutch Republic was proclaimed in 1581, the Ridderzaal was initially a public space, often used by traders, stallholders, and book sellers. In 1584, stadtholder Maurice moved into the stadtholder's quarter, and in the same year, the Ridderzaal became the meeting place of the newly formed States General of the Dutch Republic. The expansions of the Binnenhof by Maurice were the beginning of a gradually advancing reconstruction of the castle that ended after the construction of the southern wing under stadtholder William V, in the late 18th century.

=== The Netherlands ===
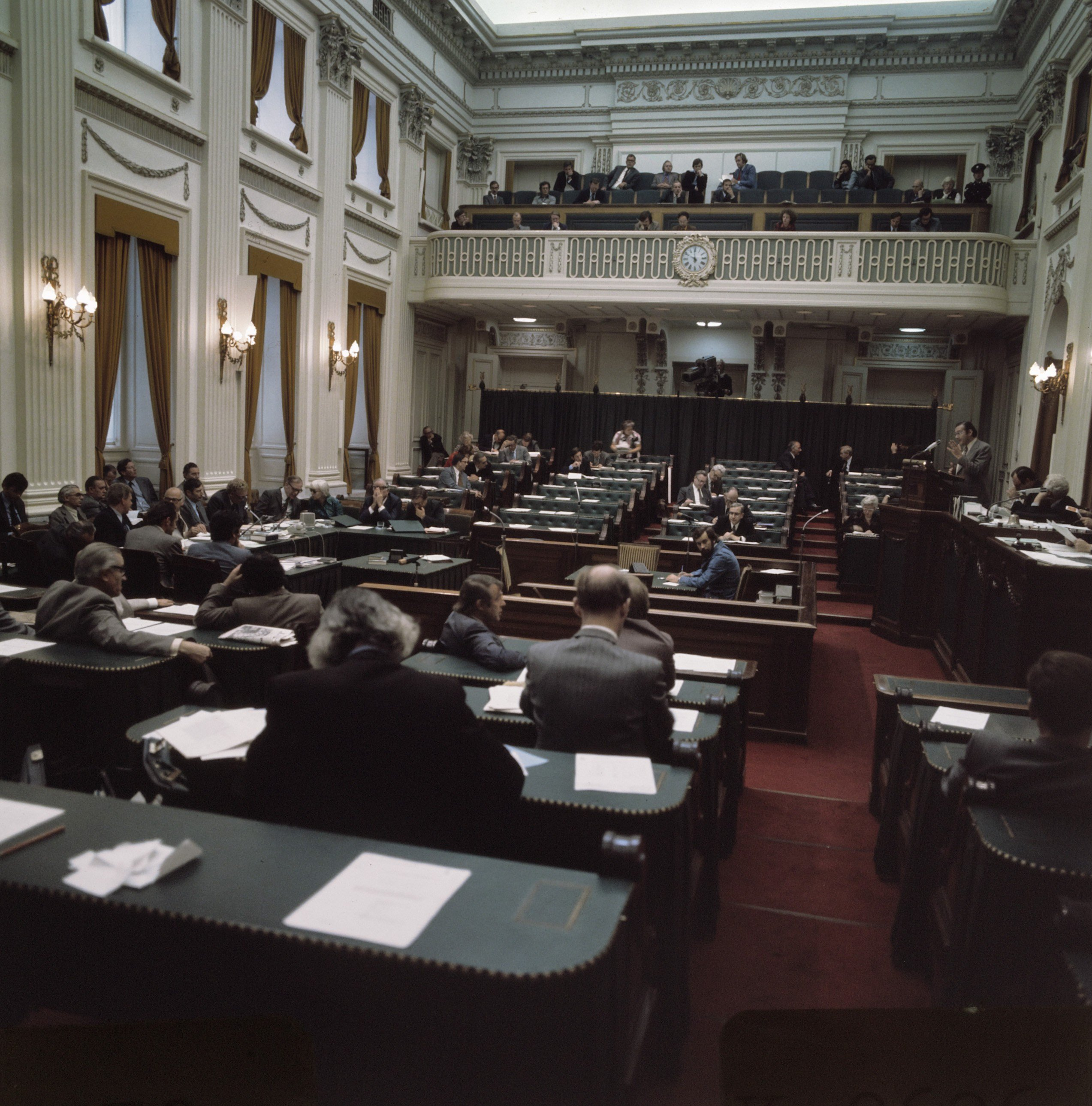
The House of Representatives sat in the Oude Zaal ('Old Hall') until 1992, when it had become too small for its 150 members, and a modern expansion was built on the south of the building, housing its new seat.

Following the proclamation of the Batavian Republic, the National Assembly met for the first time in March 1796 in the former ballroom of William V. The hall would later be used for the House of Representatives until 1992. Between 1806 and 1810, under French rule, the administrative centre of the Netherlands was moved to Amsterdam, and the Binnenhof became disused and was considered for demolition. When the Netherlands gained independence from France, however, the government moved back to the Binnenhof. The existence of the building was in danger a second time in 1848, when a new constitution instituted a system of parliamentary democracy and the States General wished to symbolically demolish the old government buildings and build a new complex. The local residents, however, cared more for the historic value of the building, and successfully protested against demolition.

==== Renovation ====
The Binnenhof has been undergoing a full-scale renovation since autumn 2021.

== Layout ==
Originally built as a ballroom, the Gothic Ridderzaal (a great hall; literally "Knight's Hall") today forms the centre of the Binnenhof. Every third Tuesday of September, on Prinsjesdag, this is where the King holds his annual Speech from the Throne. Other buildings shape a rectangle around the Ridderzaal, creating a large courtyard in front of the building, and a smaller square behind it. A gilt Neo-Gothic fountain adorns the courtyard and a statue of King William II, one of few Dutch equestrian statues, guards its gate, the Stadtholder's Gate, which dates from 1620.

Looking out over the Hofvijver, the Senate sits in a chamber in the western corner of the Binnenhof, while the House of Representatives originally sat in the southern corner, at the other side of the Stadtholder's Gate. Today, the lower house meets in a chamber in the large modern eastern part of the complex. The Prime Minister's office has since 1982 been located in the small tower in the northern corner, simply called the Torentje ("Little Tower"). Located in the north-western wing, the Trêveszaal is a meeting room originally built for negotiations during the Eighty Years' War; today, it is the meeting room of the cabinet.

== Gallery ==
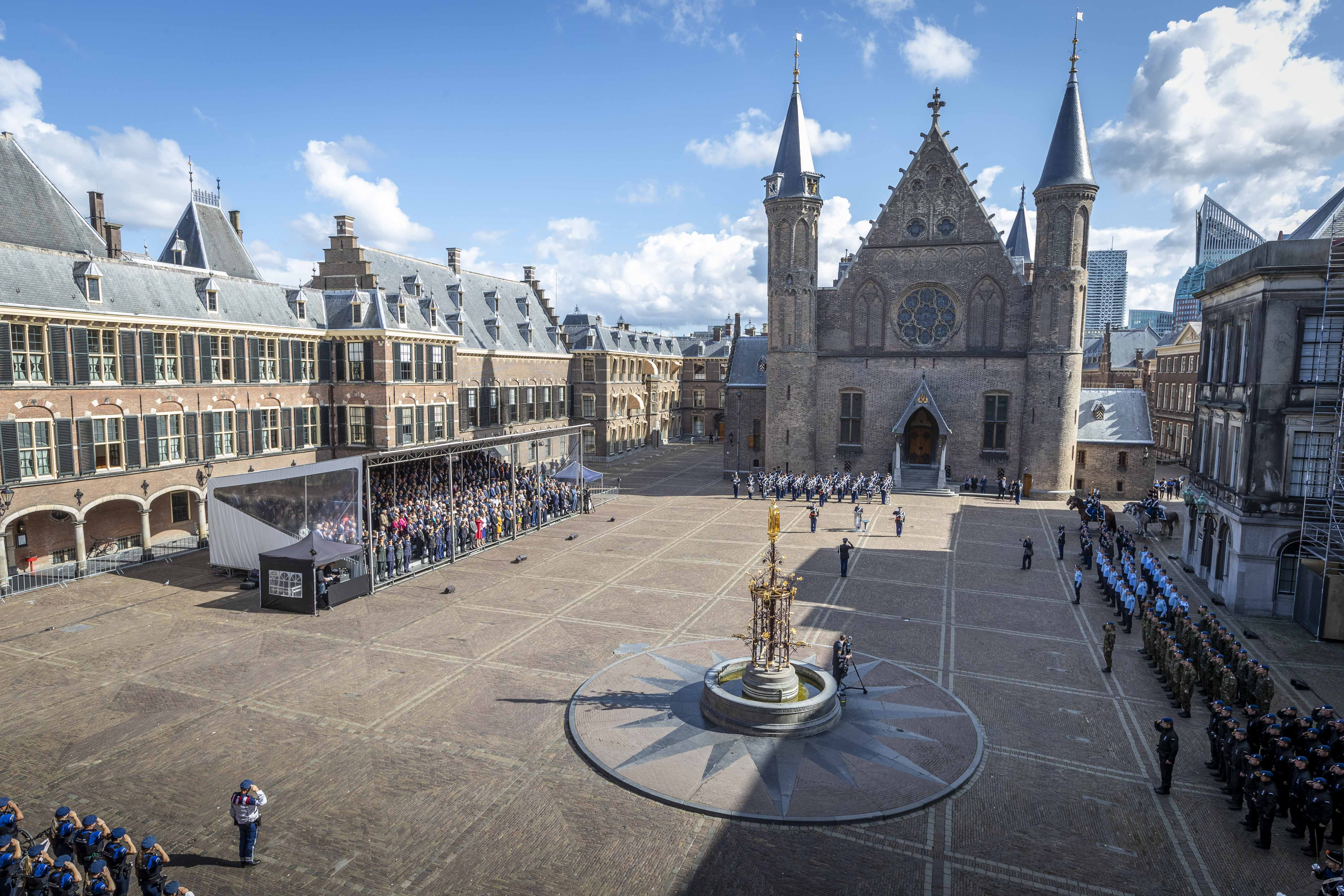
The Ridderzaal in 2019

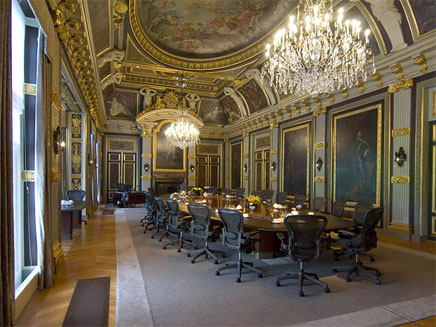
The Trêveszaal Historic meeting room

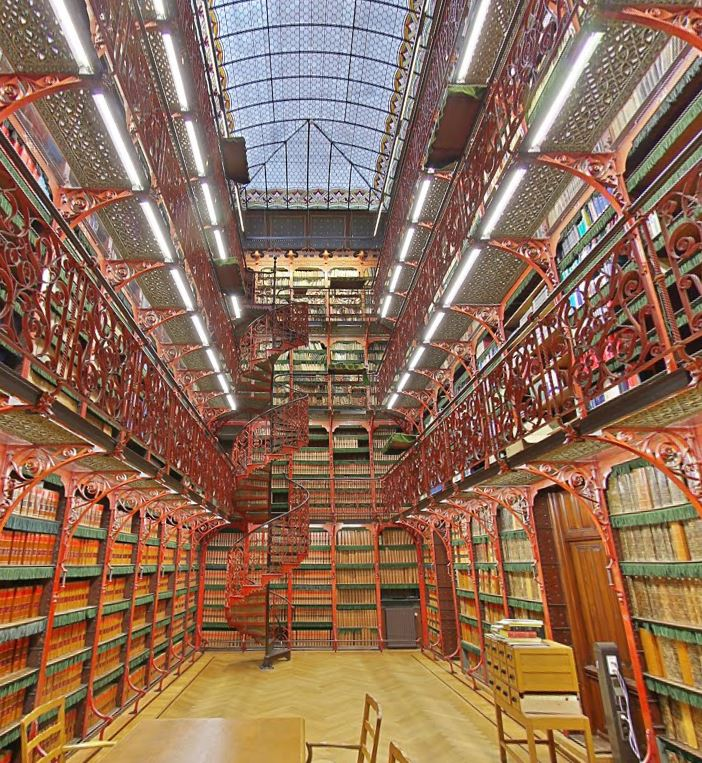
The Handelingenkamer, the Library of the Binnenhof

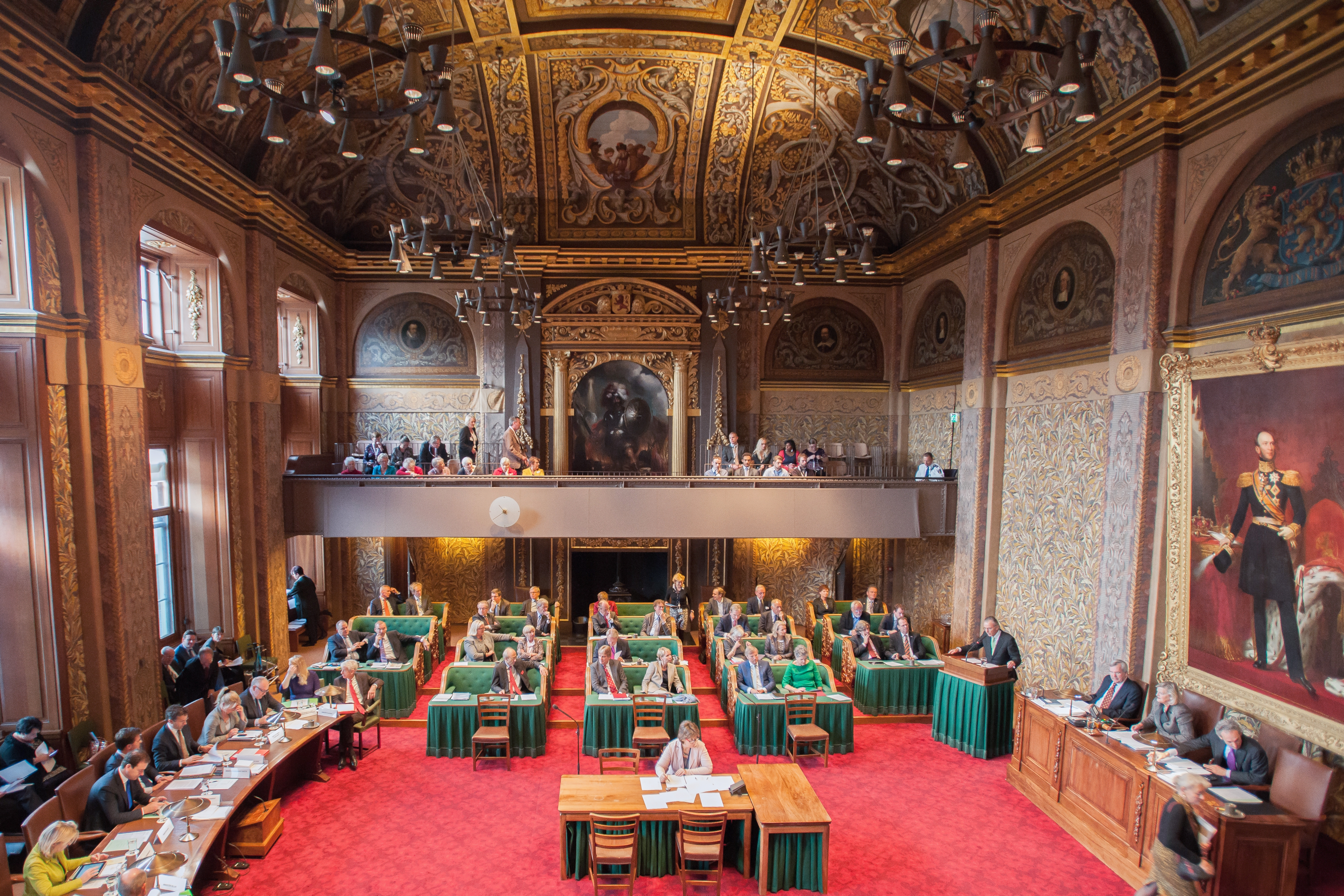
The Senate Plenary Hall

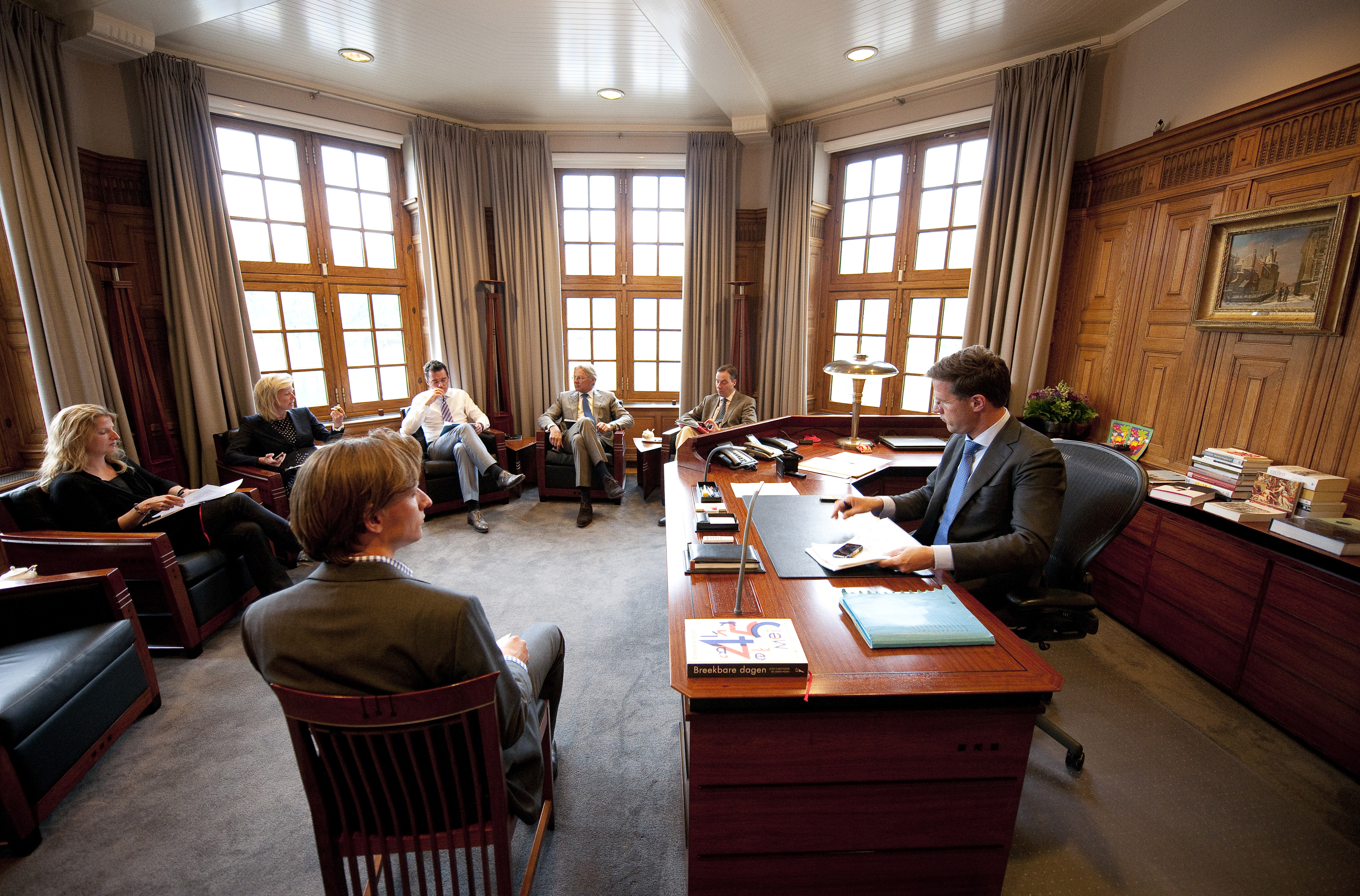
The office of the prime minister of the Netherlands

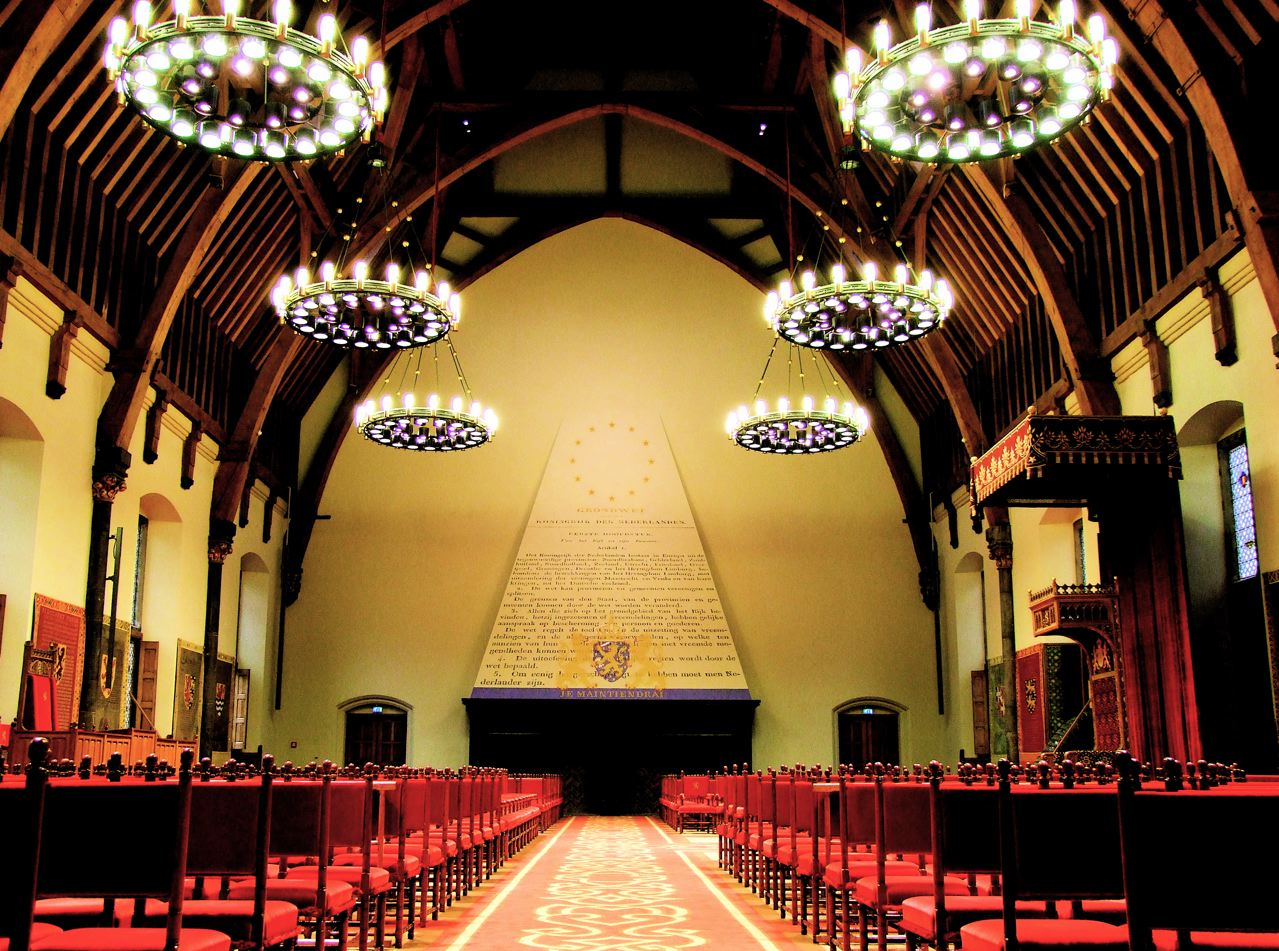
Throne of the monarchs of the Netherlands in the Ridderzaal

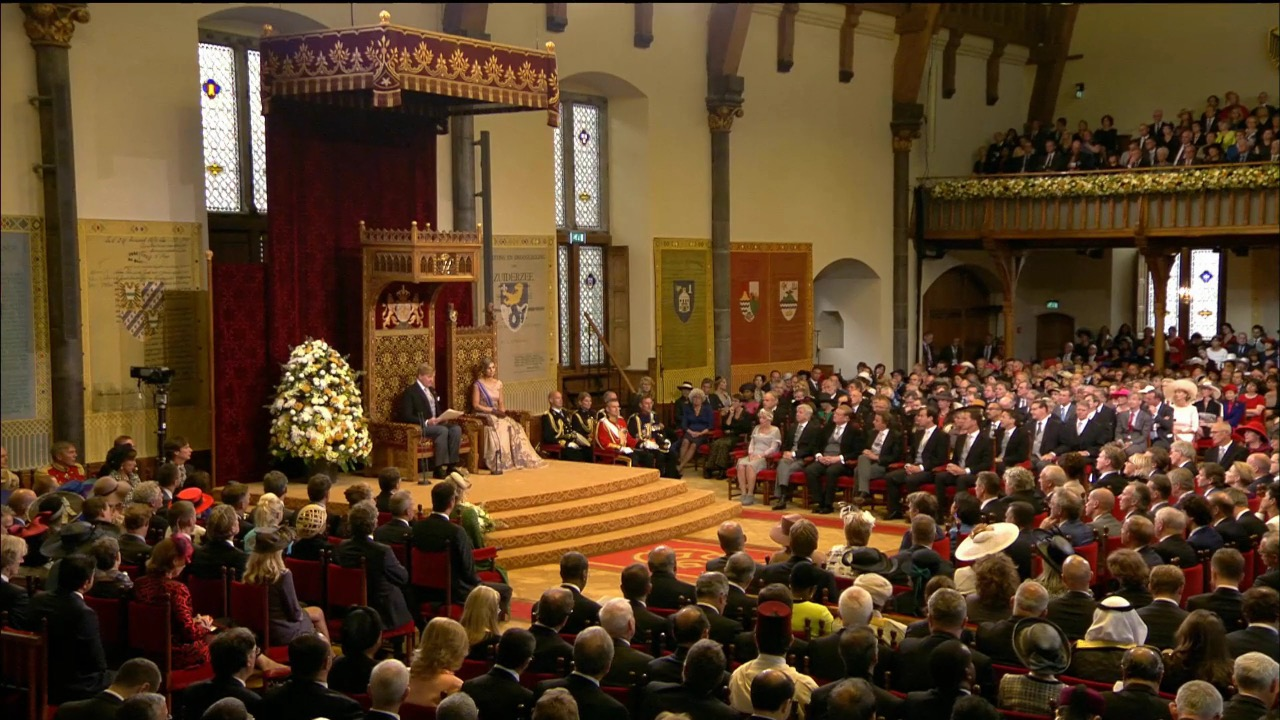
The speech from the throne

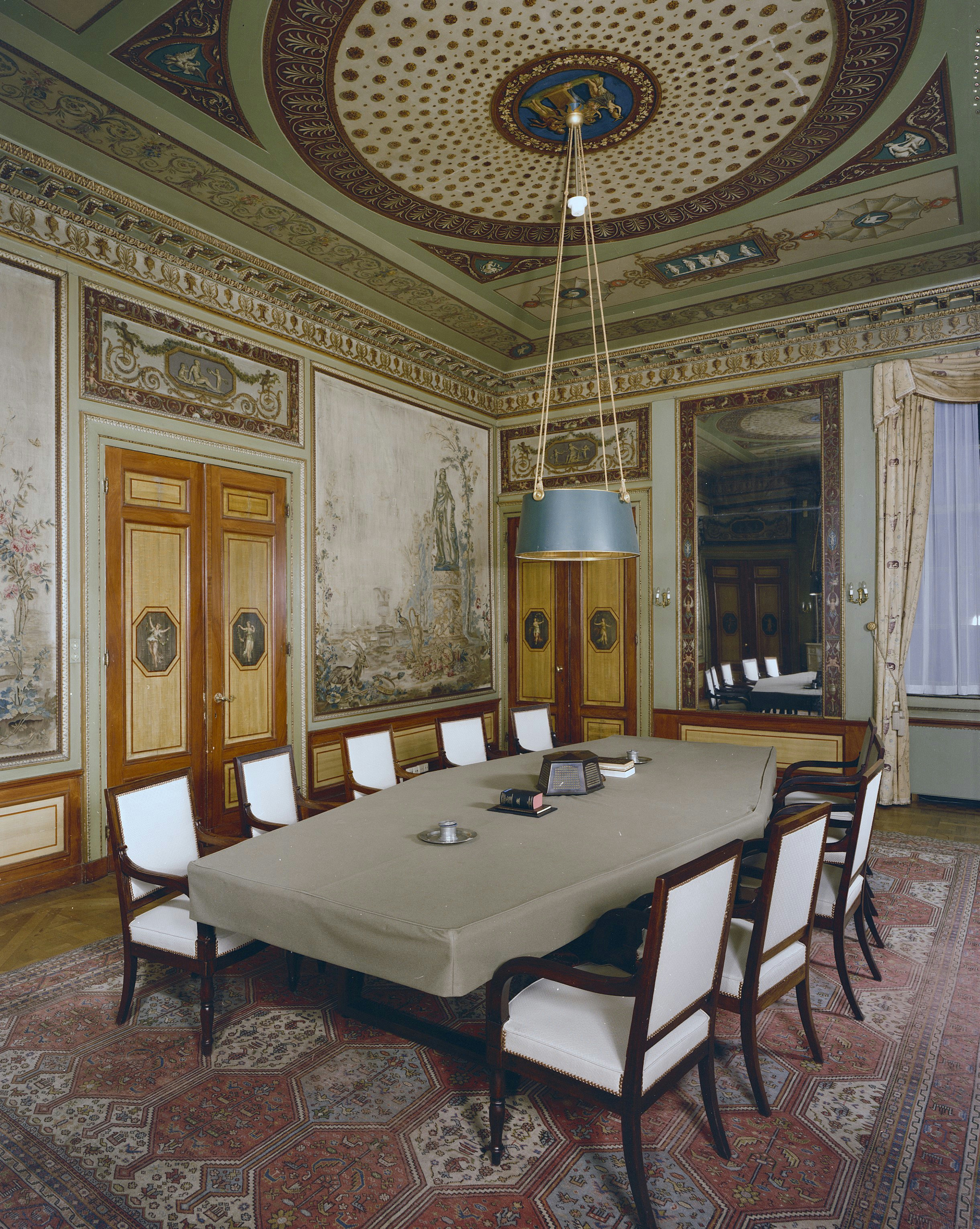
Stadhouderskamer

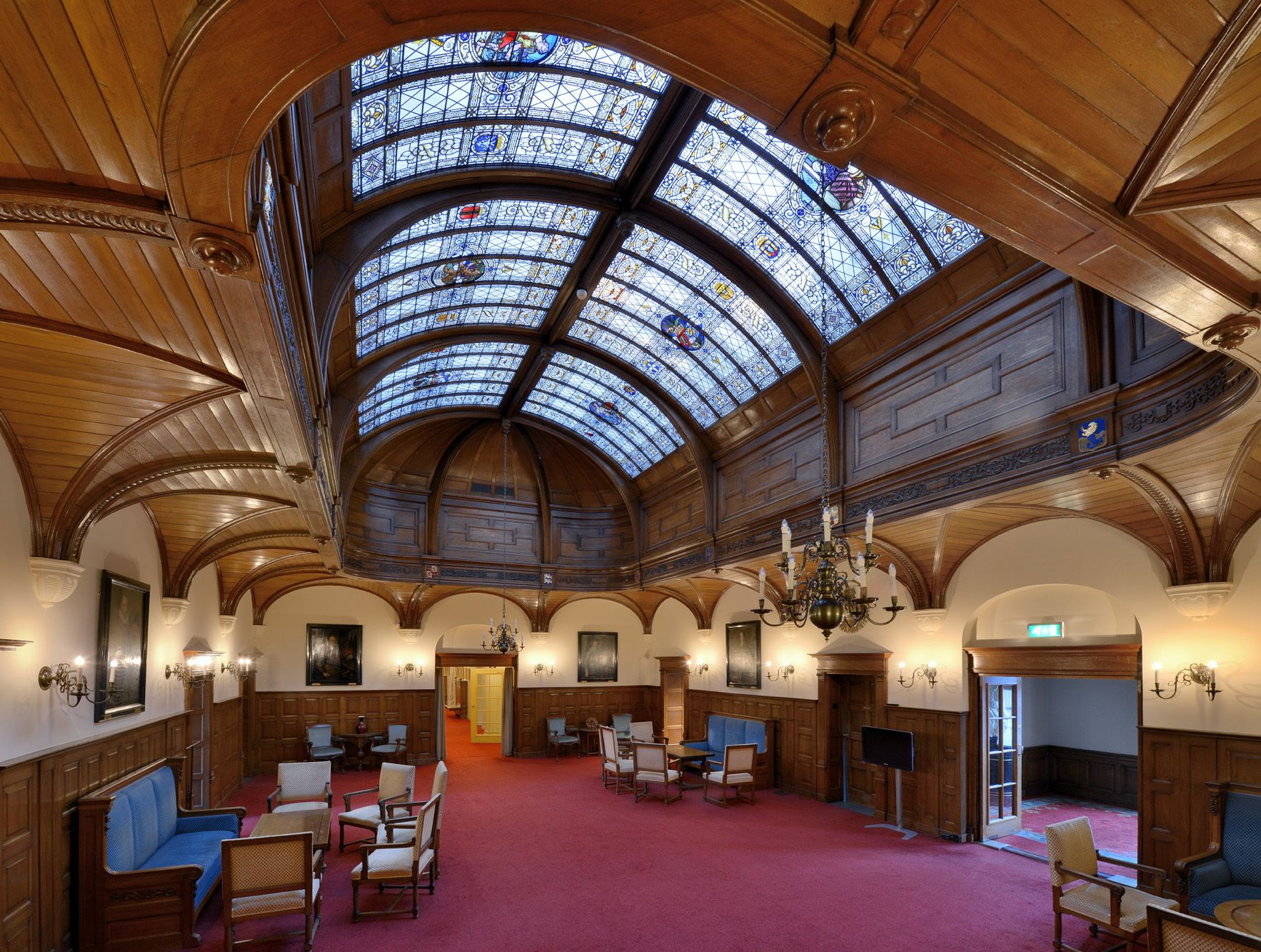
The central hall of the Senate

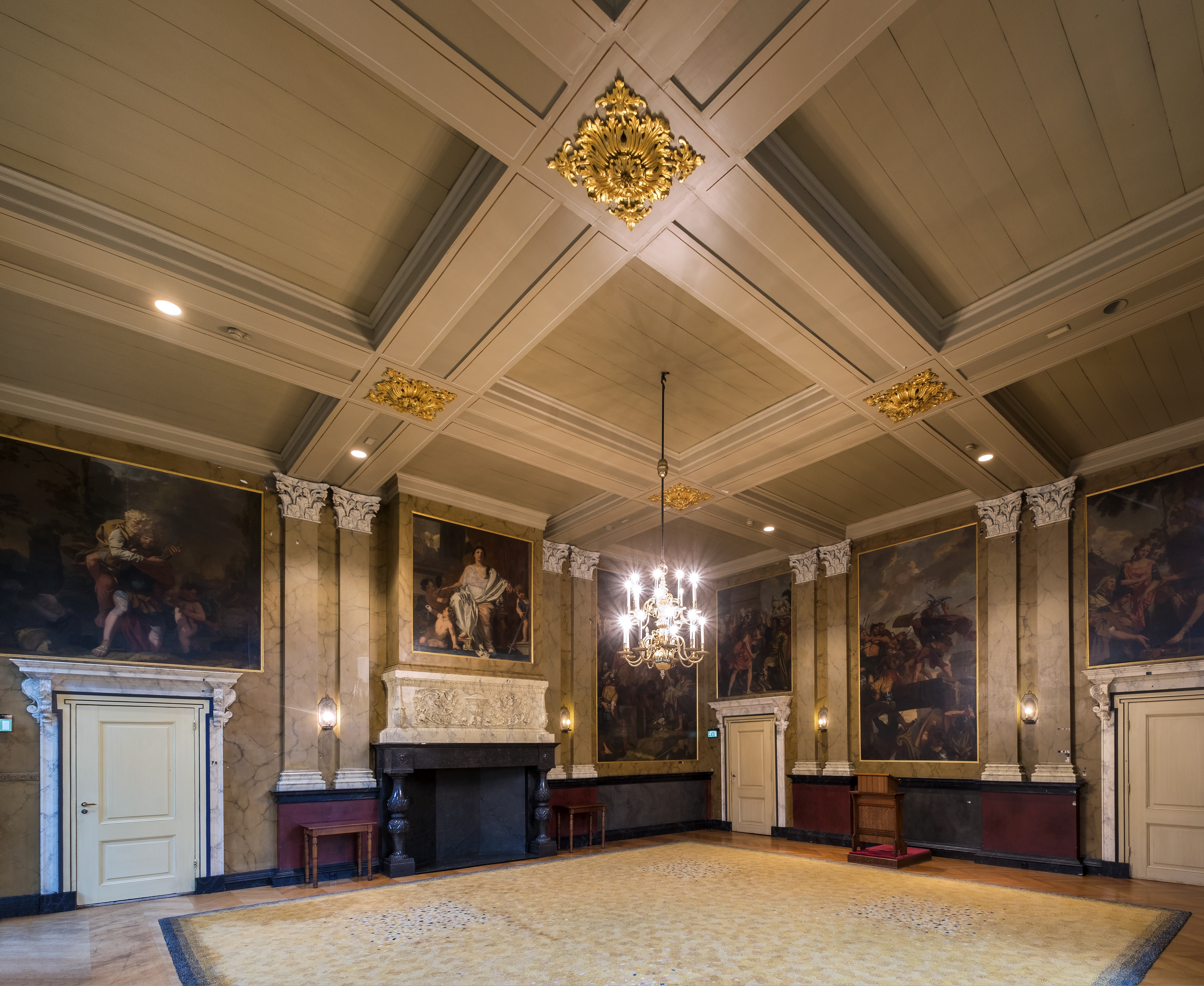
De Laressezaal

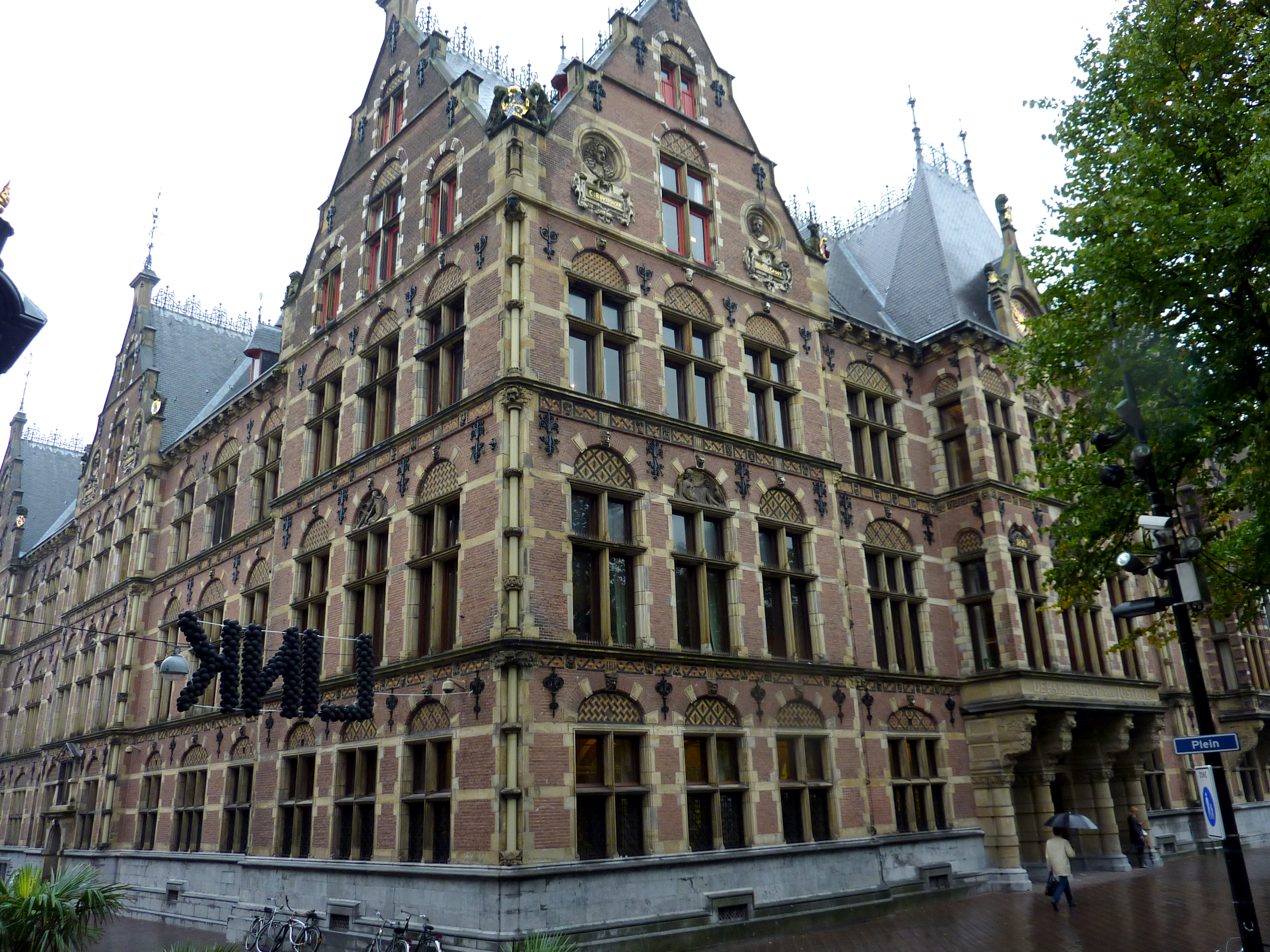
The former Department of Justice houses the offices of the House of Representatives

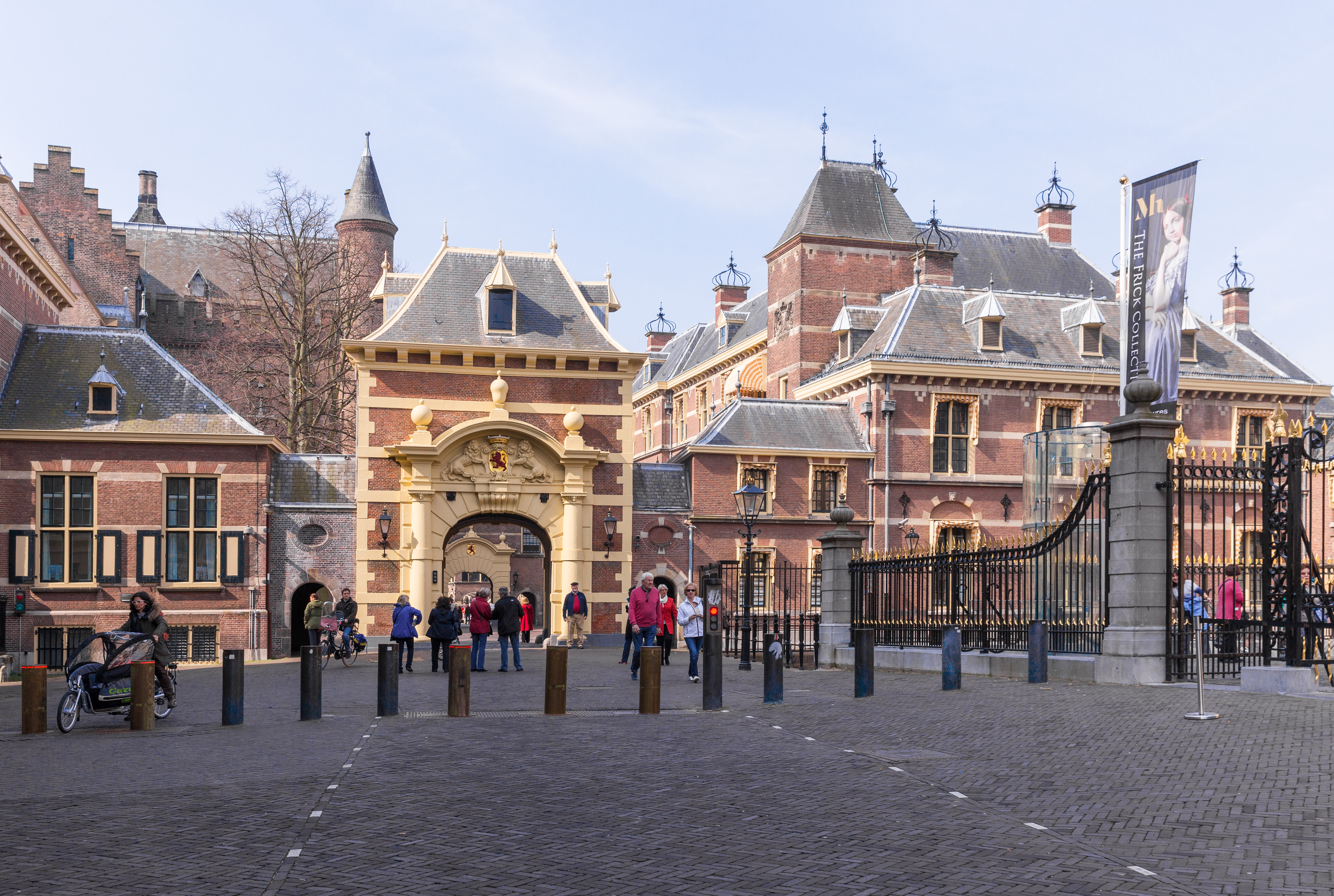
The Mauritsgate

== Sources ==
- The Binnenhof The Hague Comital Centre of Power in the 13th Century (PDF). The Hague: Board of Government Architect and Government Advisors. November 2024. ISBN 978-90-834845-2-5.
- Smit, Diederik (2015). Het belang van het Binnenhof [The importance of the Binnenhof] (in Dutch). hdl:1887/33239.
- Alberts, Jaco; Habben Jansen, Eddy; Smit, Diederik (2013). Het Haagse Binnenhof. Acht eeuwen centrum van de macht (in Dutch). The Hague: ProDemos & Haags Historisch Museum. ISBN 978-90-6473-475-5.
