= Waldeck, The Hague =

Coordinates: 52°3′30″N 4°14′15″E

Waldeck
- Location of Waldeck in The Hague
- Country: Netherlands
- Province: South Holland
- Municipality: The Hague
- District: Loosduinen

Area
  - Total: 1.86 km^{2} (0.72 sq mi)
  - Land: 1.78 km^{2} (0.69 sq mi)
  - Water: 0.08 km^{2} (0.03 sq mi)

Population (1 January 2020)
  - Total: 17,514
  - Density: 9,400/km^{2} (24,000/sq mi)

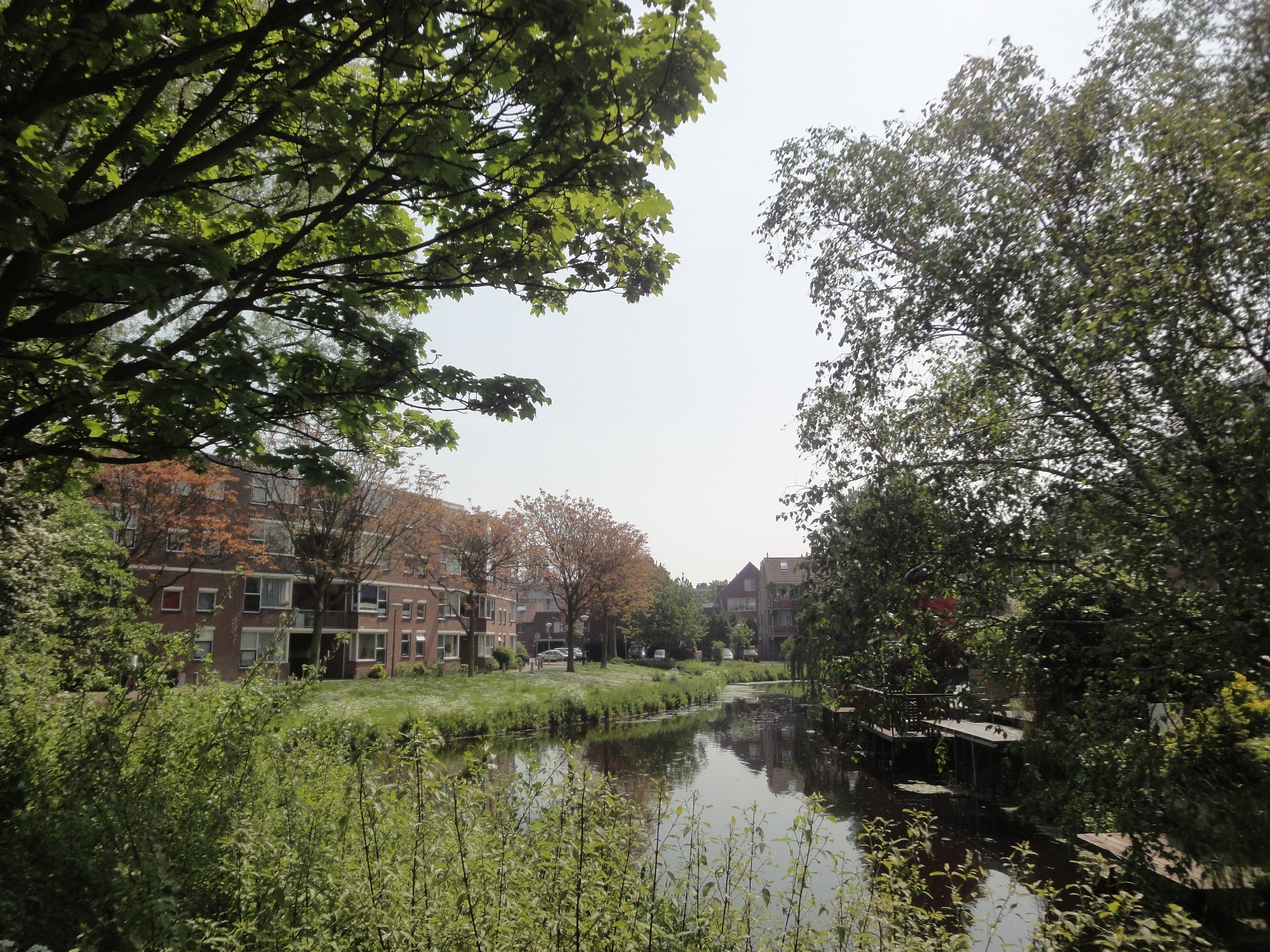

Waldeck is a wijk in the Loosduinen stadsdeel. Waldeck borders Kijkduin in the southwest, Bohemen en Meer en Bos in the northwest, Vruchtenbuurt in the northeast, Houtwijk in the southeast and Loosduinen in the south. One of the areas of Waldeck is the Componistenbuurt. Waldeck used to be part of te Loosduinen municipality which was largely annexed by The Hague in 1923 (except for Rustenburg/Oostbroek which was annexed in 1903 and Ockenburgh which was annexed in 1931).
