= Morgenstond =

Coordinates: 52°03′N 4°16′E

- Location of Morgenstond in The Hague
- Country: Netherlands
- Province: South Holland
- Municipality: The Hague
- District: Escamp

Area
  - Total: 1.63 km^{2} (0.63 sq mi)
  - Land: 1.58 km^{2} (0.61 sq mi)
  - Water: 0.05 km^{2} (0.02 sq mi)

Population (1 January 2020)
  - Total: 20,251
  - Density: 12,000/km^{2} (32,000/sq mi)

Morgenstond (Dutch pronunciation: [ˈmɔrɣə(n)ˌstɔnt], literally Morning or Dawn) is a 'wijk' in the south of The Hague in the Escamp 'stadsdeel'. Morgenstond was built during the early 50s and borders Bouwlust and Vrederust in the west, Leyenburg and Houtwijk in the north, Moerwijk and Zuiderpark in the east and Wateringse Veld in the south. Most streets in Morgenstond are named after places in Drenthe and Overijssel. Morgenstond used to be part of the former Loosduinen municipality, which was annexed by The Hague in 1923.

Morgenstond can be divided into three neighborhoods:

- Morgenstond-West (Morgenstond-West)
- Morgenstond-Oost (Morgenstond-East)
- Morgenstond-Zuid (Morgenstond-South)
