= The Hague dialect =

Dutch dialect of The Hague

- Haags
- Pronunciation: [ɦaːχs]
- Native to: Netherlands
- Region: The Hague, Zoetermeer
- Language family: Germanic: West Germanic; Istvaeonic; Low Franconian; Dutch; Hollandic; South Hollandic; The Hague dialect

Language codes
- ISO 639-3: –
- Glottolog: None

The Hague dialect (Standard Dutch: Haags, het Haagse dialect; The Hague dialect: Haags, et Haagse dialek) is a dialect of Dutch mostly spoken in The Hague. It differs from Standard Dutch almost exclusively in pronunciation.

It has two subvarieties:

- Low-class plat Haags, generally spoken roughly south of the Laan van Meerdervoort;
- More posh dàftig, Haegs or bekakt Haags, generally spoken roughly north of the Laan van Meerdervoort.

== Distribution ==
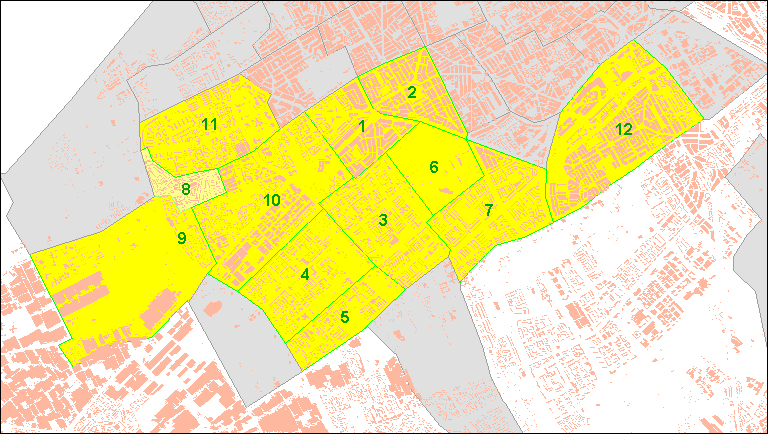
Districts of The Hague where The Hague dialect is spoken.

1. Leyenburg
2. Rustenburg en Oostbroek
3. Morgenstond
4. Bouwlust
5. Vrederust
6. Zuiderpark
7. Moerwijk
8. parts of Loosduinen
9. Kraayenstein
10. Houtwijk
11. Waldeck
12. Laakkwartier

Rijswijk and Voorburg are for the most part Haags-speaking.

Scheveningen has its own dialect (Schevenings), which is different than the traditional The Hague dialect. However, some people also speak The Hague dialect there, or a mixture between the Scheveningen dialect and The Hague dialect (Nieuw-Schevenings).

The dialect of Loosduinen (Loosduins) is very similar to The Hague dialect, and Ton Goeman classifies it as a separate dialect. It differs from other varieties of Haags by having a diphthongal pronunciation of /ɛi/ and /ʌu/.

Some people also speak The Hague dialect in Zoetermeer. That is because an influx of people from The Hague to Zoetermeer took place in the 1960s, multiplying the population of the latter twelve times.

== Spelling ==
Apart from Tilburg, The Hague is the only Dutch city with an official dialectal spelling, used e.g. in the Haagse Harry comic series written by Marnix Rueb.

Apart from that, The Hague dialect is rather rarely written. The Haagse Harry spelling works as follows:

Phoneme	Spelling	
Phoneme	Standard	Haagse Harry
/eː/	ee, e^{1}	ei
/eːr/	eer, er^{2}	
/øː/	eu	ui
/øːr/	eur	
/oː/	oo, o^{1}	au
/oːr/	oor, or^{2}	
/ɛi̯/	ei, ij	è
/œy̯/	ui	ùi
/ʌu̯/	ou(w), au(w)	âh/ah^{3}
/ər/	er	âh/ah^{3}
/ən/	en	ûh/uh/e,^{3} en^{4}

^1 The second spelling is used before a syllable that starts with one consonant followed by a vowel.
^2 The second spelling is used before a syllable that starts with a vowel.
^3 The spellings ⟨âh⟩ and ⟨ah⟩ are in free variation, as the Haagse Harry spelling is inconsistent in this case. The same applies to ⟨ûh⟩, ⟨uh⟩ and ⟨e⟩. For consistency, this article will use only ⟨âh⟩ and ⟨e⟩.
^4 /ən/ is written ⟨en⟩ only when the word in the standard language has a single stem that ends in -en. Thus, standard ik teken "I draw" is written ik teiken, but standard de teken "the ticks" is written de teike.

== Phonology ==
The sound inventory of The Hague dialect is very similar to that of Standard Dutch.

=== Vowels ===
Monophthongs
	Front				Central	Back	
	unrounded		rounded		unrounded	Back	
	short	long	short	long	short	short	long
Close	i		y			u	
Near-close	ɪ		ʏ				
Mid					ə		
Open-mid	ɛ	ɛː		œː		ɔ	
Open		aː				ɑ	ɑː

- Among the back vowels, /u, ɔ/ are rounded, whereas /ɑ, ɑː/ are unrounded.
- /ɪ/ and /ʏ/ may be somewhat closer to, respectively, cardinal [i] and [y] than in Standard Dutch.
- The long vowels /ɛː, œː, ɑː/ correspond to closing diphthongs /ɛi̯, œy̯, ʌu̯/ in Standard Dutch.
- /ɛ/ may be realized as mid near-front [ɛ̽].
- /aː/ may be somewhat higher (closer to [æː]) than in Standard Dutch, especially before /r/.

Diphthongs
	Ending point		
	Front		Back
	unrounded	rounded	rounded
Mid	eɪ	øʏ	oʊ

- These diphthongs correspond to long vowels /eː, øː, oː/ in Belgian Standard Dutch. In Netherlandic Standard Dutch, they are diphthongized just as in The Hague dialect.
- Some speakers may realize them as wider diphthongs [ɛe̯, œø̯, ɔu̯], which sound almost like Standard Dutch /ɛi̯, œy̯, ʌu̯/.
- An alternative realization of /oʊ/ is a central diphthong [əʊ̯̈]. It is common, albeit stigmatized.
- Before /r/, /ɔ/ contrasts with /oʊ/ primarily by length for some speakers.

=== Consonants ===
		Labial	Alveolar	Palatal	Velar / Uvular	Glottal
Nasal		m	n	(ɲ)	ŋ	
Plosive / Affricate	voiceless	p	t	(tɕ)	k	(ʔ)
Plosive / Affricate	voiced	b	d	(dʑ)	(ɡ)	
Fricative	voiceless	f	s	(ɕ)	χ	
Fricative	voiced	(v)	z	(ʑ)	(ʁ)	ɦ
Approximant		ʋ	l	j		
Trill			ʀ			

- /m, p, b/ are bilabial, whereas /f, v, ʋ/ are labiodental.
  - As in Standard Dutch, the speakers of The Hague dialect are inconsistent in maintaining the /f–v/ contrast, and tend to merge these two phonemes into /f/. [v] also occurs as an allophone of /f/ before voiced consonants, or even between vowels.
- As in Standard Dutch, /n, t, d, s, z, l/ are laminal [n̻, t̻, d̻, s̻, z̻, l̻].
  - Preconsontantal sequence of a vowel and /n/ is realized simply as a nasalized vowel, e.g. as in kans [kɑ̃s].
- /ŋ, k, ɡ/ are velar, whereas /χ, ʁ/ are post-velar [x̠, ɣ̄] or pre-uvular [χ˖, ʁ̟]. Both the place and the manner of articulation of /ʀ/ varies; see below.
  - As in Standard Dutch, the speakers of The Hague dialect are inconsistent in maintaining the /χ–ʁ/ contrast, and tend to merge these two phonemes into /χ/.
- As in Standard Dutch, /ɲ, tɕ, dʑ, ɕ, ʑ/ are alveolo-palatal, whereas /j/ is palatal.
  - As in Standard Dutch, /ɲ, tɕ, ɕ, ʑ/ can be regarded simply as sequences /nj, tj, sj, zj/.
- Some consonant clusters are simplified, e.g. nach /nɑχ/ "night" (Standard Dutch nacht /nɑχt/).

==== Realization of /ʀ/ ====
- According to Goeman & van de Velde (2001), the uvular articulation of /ʀ/ in The Hague dialect is often considered to be a French influence.
- According to Collins & Mees (2003), /ʀ/ in The Hague dialect is often uvular, with the fricative realizations [χ] and [ʁ] being more or less the norm. They also state that "elision of the final /ʀ/ is common".
- According to Sebregts (2014):
  - Alveolar realizations are practically non-existent. The only instances of alveolar /ʀ/ include an alveolar approximant [ɹ], a voiced alveolar trill [r] and a voiceless alveolar tap [ɾ̥], all of which occurred only once.
  - The sequences /χʀ/ (as in schrift) and /ʁʀ/ (as in gras) tend to coalesce to [χ] (schift [sχɪft], gas [χɑs]).
  - A retroflex/bunched approximant [ɻ] is the most common realization of /ʀ/, occurring about 30% more often than the second common realizations (a uvular trill [ʀ] and a uvular approximant [ʁ̞]), but it appears almost exclusively in the syllable coda.
  - Preconsonantal /ʀ/ in the syllable coda (as in warm) can be followed by a schwa [ə] (warrem [ˈʋɑʀəm]). This is more common in older than younger speakers and more common in men than women.
  - The stereotypical [ɐ] realization of the coda /ʀ/ occurs only in about 2% cases. This may signify either that it is dying out, or that it is simply found in varieties broader than the one investigated in Sebregts (2014).
  - Other realizations include: a uvular fricative [ʁ], elision of /ʀ/, a uvular fricative trill [ʀ̝], a palatal approximant [j], a mid front vowel [ɛ], as well as elision of /ʀ/ accompanied by a retraction of the following consonant.

== Vocabulary ==
The following list contains only a few examples.

Standard Dutch	The Hague dialect	English translation
aanzienlijk	anzienlek	'considerable'
als	as	'if, when'
Boekhorststraat	Boekkogststraat	(name of a street)
Den Haag	De Haag	'The Hague'
dialect	dialek	'dialect'
Lorentzplein	Lorensplèn	(name of a square)
Randstad	Ranstad	'Randstad'
tenslotte	teslotte	'in the end'
verschillen	veschille	'differences, to differ'

== Sample ==
=== Harry-spelling ===
Et Haags is et stasdialek dat doâh de âhtogtaune "volleksklasse" van De Haag wogt gesprauke. Et behoâht tot de Zùid-Hollandse dialekte.

=== Standard Dutch spelling ===
Het Haags is het stadsdialect dat door de autochtone "volksklasse" van Den Haag wordt gesproken. Het behoort tot de Zuid-Hollandse dialecten.

=== Translation ===
The Hague dialect is a city dialect that is spoken by the autochthonous working class of The Hague. It belongs to the South Hollandic dialects.

=== Phonetic transcription ===
[ət ɦaːχs ɪs‿ət stɑzdi.aɫɛk dɑ‿döːɐ̯ də ɑːtɔχtoʊ̯nə fɔɫəksklɑsə fɑ̃‿də ɦaːχ ʋɔχt χəspʀoʊ̯kə || əd‿bəhöːɐ̯‿tɔ‿də zœːtɦɔɫɑ̃tsə di.aɫɛktə]

== See also ==
- Dutch dialect

== Bibliography ==
- Collins, Beverley; Mees, Inger M. (2003) [First published 1981], The Phonetics of English and Dutch (5th ed.), Leiden: Brill Publishers, ISBN 9004103406
- Goeman, Ton (1999), "'s-Gravenhage. Het Haags en zijn standaarden." (PDF), in Kruijsen, Joep; van der Sijs, Nicoline (eds.), Honderd Jaar Stadstaal, Uitgeverij Contact, pp. 121–135
- Goeman, Ton; van de Velde, Hans (2001). "Co-occurrence constraints on /r/ and /ɣ/ in Dutch dialects". In van de Velde, Hans; van Hout, Roeland (eds.). 'r-atics. Brussels: Etudes & Travaux. pp. 91–112. ISSN 0777-3692.
- Gooskens, Charlotte; van Bezooijen, Renée (2002), "The role of prosodic and verbal aspects of speech in the perceived divergence of Dutch and English language varieties", in Berns, Jan; van Marle, Jaap (eds.), Present-day Dialectology: Problems and Findings, Berlin: Mouton de Gruyter, pp. 173–192, ISBN 3-11-016781-6
- Sebregts, Koen (2014), "3.4.9 The Hague" (PDF), The Sociophonetics and Phonology of Dutch r, Utrecht: LOT, pp. 115–120, ISBN 978-94-6093-161-1, archived from the original (PDF) on 2016-03-04
- van Bezooijen, Renée (2002), "Aesthetic evaluation of Dutch: Comparisons across Dialects, Accents, and Languages", in Long, Daniel; Preston, Dennis R. (eds.), Handbook of Perceptual Dialectology, vol. 2, John Benjamins B.V., pp. 13–31, ISBN 90-272-2185-5
