= Laan van Meerdervoort =

Avenue in The Hague, Netherlands

Coordinates: 52.0834°N 4.2911°E

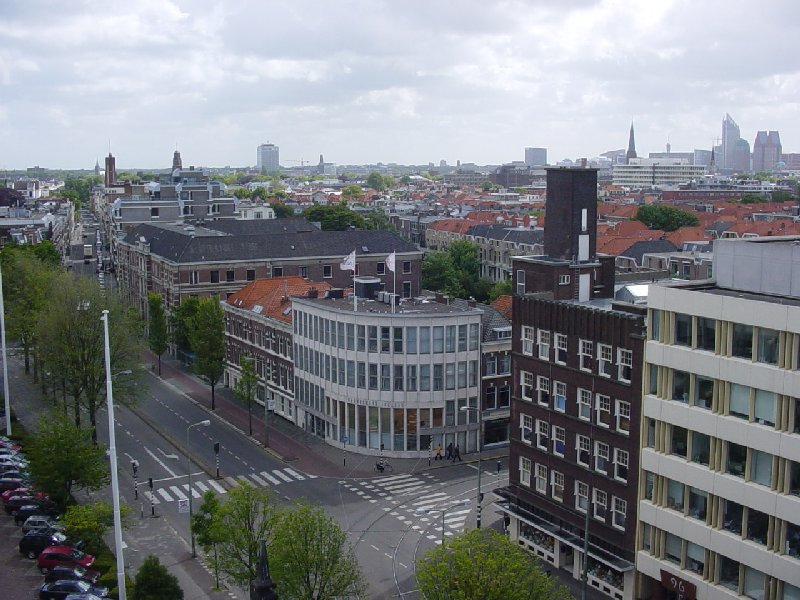
- The crossing of the Laan van Meerdervoort and the Zoutmanstraat as seen from the tower of Gymnasium Haganum
- Interactive map of Laan van Meerdervoort
- Length: 5,800 m (19,000 ft)
- Location: The Hague, Netherlands

Construction
- Construction start: 1875; 151 years ago
- Completion: 1960; 66 years ago

Other
- Known for: The longest avenue in the Netherlands; isogloss of The Hague dialect

The Laan van Meerdervoort (Dutch pronunciation: [ˈlaːɱ vɑˈmeːrdərvoːrt]) is an avenue in The Hague. At a length of 5.8 km, it is (as of 2011) the longest avenue in the Netherlands.

The Laan van Meerdervoort is more or less an isogloss of two sub-varieties of The Hague dialect. The posher variety called dàftig, Haegs or bekakt Haags is spoken roughly north of it, whereas a working-class variety called plat Haags or Hèègs is spoken roughly south of the Laan van Meerdervoort.

== Notable buildings ==
- Gymnasium Haganum
- Museum Mesdag
