= Escamp =

Coordinates: 52°02′44″N 4°16′01″E

- District of The Hague
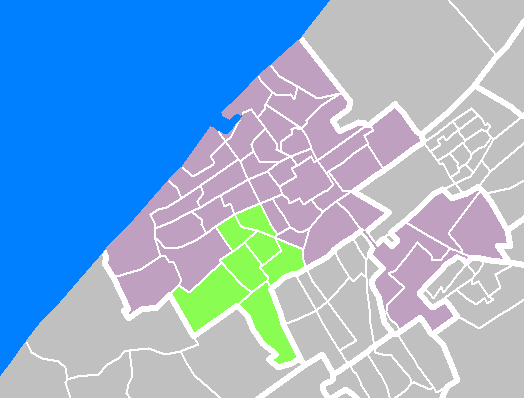
- Location in The Hague
- Country: Netherlands
- Province: South Holland
- Municipality: The Hague

Area
  - Total: 1,444.1 ha (3,568 acres)
  - Land: 1,351.7 ha (3,340 acres)

Population (2025)
  - Total: 132,809

Escamp (Dutch pronunciation: [ˈɛskɑmp]) is a district of The Hague, Netherlands, built largely after the Second World War, on the 15th century Eskamppolders. With the addition of the Vinex neighbourhood Wateringse Veld, Escamp is the most populous district of the city; as of 1 January 2026, it had 132,579 inhabitants. The district features one railway station: Den Haag Moerwijk.

Escamp consists of the following neighbourhoods:

- Bouwlust & Vrederust
- Leyenburg
- Moerwijk & Zuiderpark
- Morgenstond
- Rustenburg & Oostbroek
- Wateringse Veld
