= List of mayors of Loosduinen =

Mayors of Loosduinen

Mayor of Loosduinen
- Burgemeester van Loosduinen
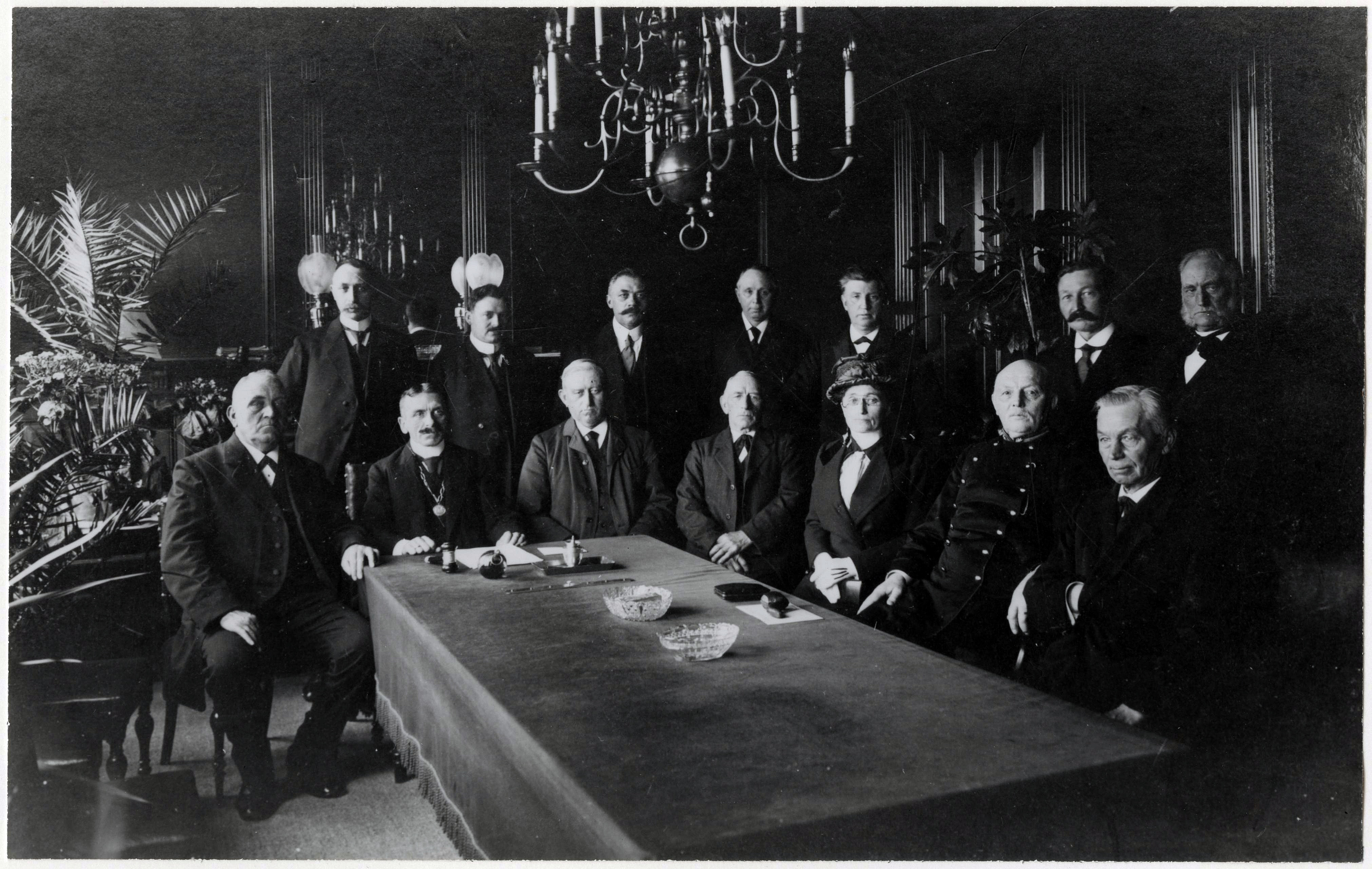
- Mayor of Loosduinen together with the Gemeenteraad of Loosduinen (1920)
- Appointer: Gemeenteraad of Loosduinen
- Inaugural holder: Franc van der Goes
- Formation: 21 October 1811
- Final holder: Hendrik Willem Hovy
- Abolished: 1 July 1923
- Superseded by: Mayor of The Hague

Below is a list of mayors of Loosduinen. Between 1811 and 1923 Loosduinen was an independent municipality (Dutch: Gemeente) that had its own mayors. After Loosduinen became part of The Hague on 1 July 1923 the office was abolished and the mayor of the Hague also became the mayor of Loosduinen, which by then had become a district.

== List ==
=== 1811–1923 ===
Portrait	Name	Term in office	
	Franc van der Goes (1772–1855)	1811	1813
	Gerrit Lodewijk Hendric Hooft (1779–1872)	1813	1817
	Daniël François (1781–1840)	1817	1840
	Johannes Marius Janszen (1814–1899)	1840	1850
	Hubertus Cato Waldeck (1811–1881)	1850	1872
	Gerrit Nicolaas de Voogt (1844–?)	1872	1883
	Henri Adolphe van de Velde (1855–1919)	1883	1901
	Hendrik Willem Hovy (?)	1901	1923
