= Loosduinen =

- District of The Hague
- Coat of arms

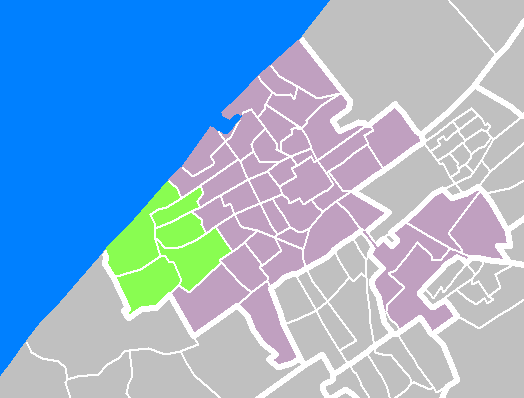
- Location in The Hague
- Coordinates: 52°03′N 4°14′E
- Country: Netherlands
- Province: South Holland
- Municipality: The Hague

Government
  - Alderman: Rachid Guernaoui (GDM/HvDH)

Area
  - Total: 1,413.5 ha (3,493 acres)
  - Land: 1,324.6 ha (3,273 acres)
  - Rank: 3rd

Population (1 January 2026)
  - Total: 55,464
  - Density: 4,187.2/km^{2} (10,845/sq mi)
- Time zone: UTC+1 (CET)
  - Summer (DST): UTC+2 (CEST)

Loosduinen (Dutch pronunciation: [loːzˈdœynə(n)]) is a former village in the Netherlands that was a municipality unto itself until 1923, when it was annexed by The Hague and subsequently became a district of the city.

Within the district there is also a neighbourhood (Dutch:wijk) called 'Loosduinen'.

It has its own dialect, the Loosduinen dialect, which is very similar to The Hague dialect.

== History ==
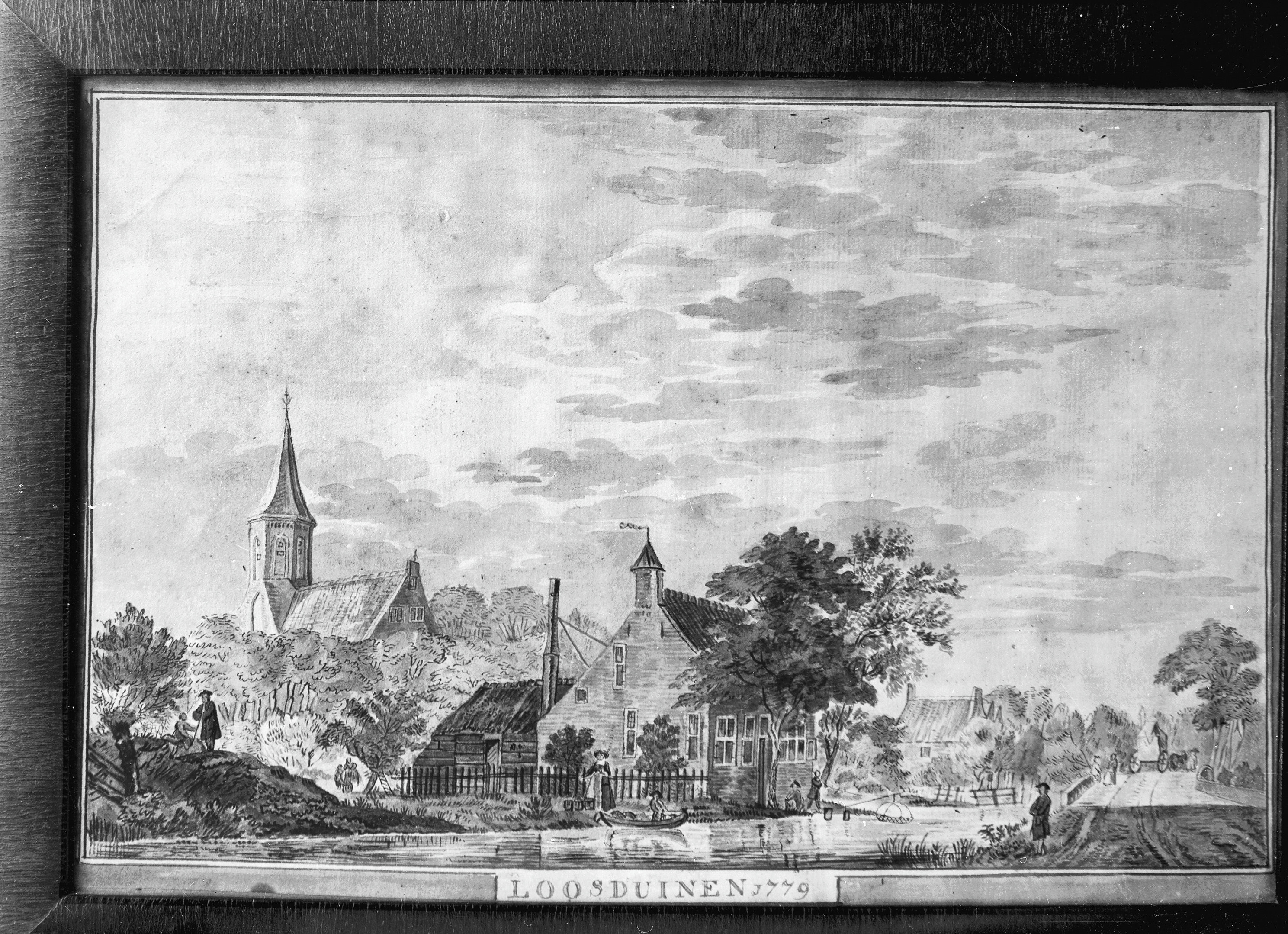
Village view of Loosduinen in 1779.

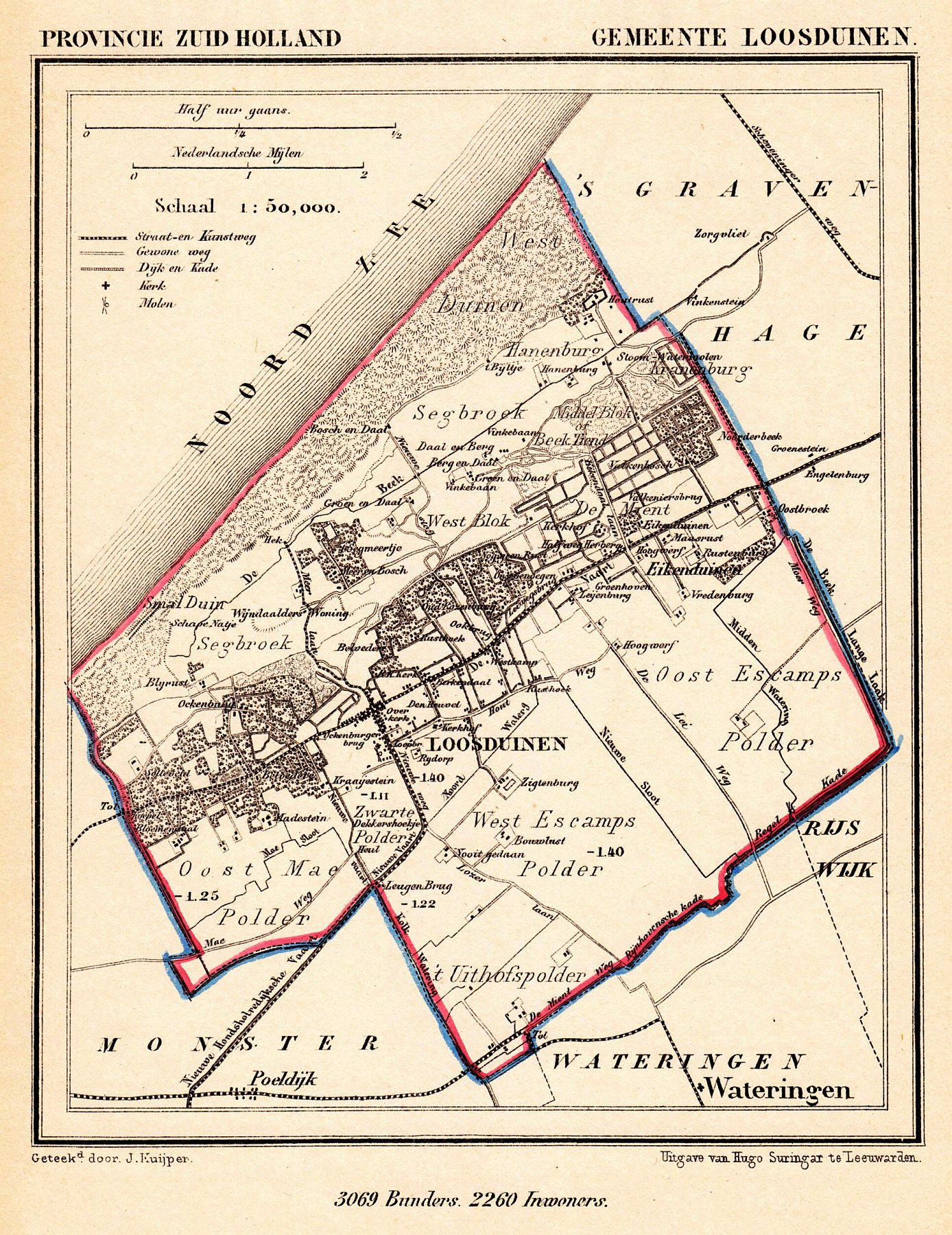
Map of the municipality of Loosduinen (1869).

The area of modern-day Loosduinen has been inhabited for at least 4,500 years. Archaeologists have found many traces of previous civilisations during excavations. For example, traces of Romans and Cananefates have been found around the beginning of our era. The origin of the name Loosduinen, however, cannot be traced back in either objects that have been found during excavations and in literature. Nonetheless, it is quite certain that it is an ancient name, since it has been used in the past to name a very old geographical area. The objects that have been recovered during excavations tell that during the first centuries after Christ Loosduinen was on the edge of the Roman Empire. These objects range from bronze objects and coins to pottery. Furthermore, horse graves have been found and a small fort has been excavated at Ockenburgh. Around the Uithofslaan a fragment of an altar and a bronze censer was found and of the native inhabitants of that time, the Cananefates, the remains of farms have been found as well.

Records point out that the actual village of Loosduinen emerged around a monastery in the twelfth century. During this time Count Floris III of Holland also founded a chapel (today known as Abbey Church) in Loosduinen, which was part of his property. The first actual written mention of Loosduinen 'Losdun' can be found in the annals of the Egmond Abbey. In these annals it is written that in 1186 Count Dirk VII of Holland married Aleida van Kleef in the chapel of the villa Losdun. Archaeologists have also discovered a farm from this period in the Loosduinen. Records also indicate that around 1228, Count Floris IV of Holland and his wife Machteld van Brabant founded a Cistercian abbey for nuns in Loosduinen. Floris IV also bought a farm in The Hague, which would later become the modern day Ridderzaal. An iconic building in both The Hague and the Netherlands. His successor, Count Floris V, separated two area's known as Haagambacht and Monsterambacht from each other in the year 1280 and as a result split a village in two parts. This village that had 36 residents in 1561 was built on what is nowadays known as the Loosduinse Hoofdstraat.

There is a legend going around that in the 14th and 15th centuries the Abbey Church acquired international fame as a place of pilgrimage for women who remained childless. The reason why barren women made a pilgrimage to the abbey is because countess Margaretha van Hennebergh and all her children were buried there. The countess gave birth to 365 sons and daughters on Good Friday in 1276. The myth goes that the countess was punished to die with all her children because she had driven away a beggar. The Abbey Church stayed a popular pilgrimage destination for barren women well into the eighteenth century. A wallplate of the story can still be seen in the Abbey Church. The monastery was destroyed at the beginning of the Eighty Years' War (1568-1648), while only a large part of the church remains. The church building is now the oldest stone building in The Hague.

During the period that the French government ruled the Netherlands, the government administration was reorganised. This meant for Loosduinen that it became an independent municipality on 21 October 1811. In addition the districts Eikenduinen, Poeldijk and Kwintsheul became part of the Loosduinen municipality, with F. van der Goes as the first mayor. However, already soon, in 1817, Kwintsheul and Poeldijk were returned to Monster. In the meantime Loosduinen remained, as it always has been, a rural municipality of farmers and market gardeners that focused mainly on cultivating fruits and vegetables. In the second half of the 19th century the cultivation of potatoes became important due to the export to United Kingdom where the demand for potatoes was high, especially during the Great Famine. The development of horticulture also took an ever-increasing flight. Around 1880 a lot was grown under glass. Especially the cultivation of green cucumbers was important. In 1899 the Loosduinsche Groentenveiling was founded by 62 gardeners: soon there were 109 members. The special thing about the gardeners from Loosduin was that they were the first to make compulsory auctioning in the Netherlands. Members were therefore prohibited from selling their products outside the auction.

== Geography ==
The district of Loosduinen has several subdistricts. Each subdistrict gets special attention by the municipal administration of The Hague. For example, for each subdistrict the municipal administration has made a plan for the period 2016–2019. These plans are tailored to the specific needs of each subdistrict.

Subistrict	Population (Note: As of 1 January 2018)	Total area (Note: In hectares.)	Land area (Note: In hectares.)	Density (Note: In persons per hectare of land area, as of 1 January 2018.)	Neighbourhoods
Bohemen, Bos en Meer	4,892	142.5	138.2	40.0	2 neighbourhoods: Bohemen/Meer en Bos; Bosjes van Pex
Kijkduin en Ockenburgh	2,345	490.9	459.4	5.1	2 neighbourhoods: Kijkduin; Ockenburgh
Kraayenstein en Vroondaal	5,857	336.1	299.8	19.5	None
Loosduinen	17,861	274.2	265.3	67.3	3 neighbourhoods: Houtwijk; Kerktuinen/Zichtenburg; Kom Loosduinen
Waldeck	17,146	185.3	177.7	96.5	5 neighbourhoods: Componistenbuurt; Nieuw Waldeck; Rosenburg; Waldeck-Noord; Waldeck-Zuid

== Transport ==
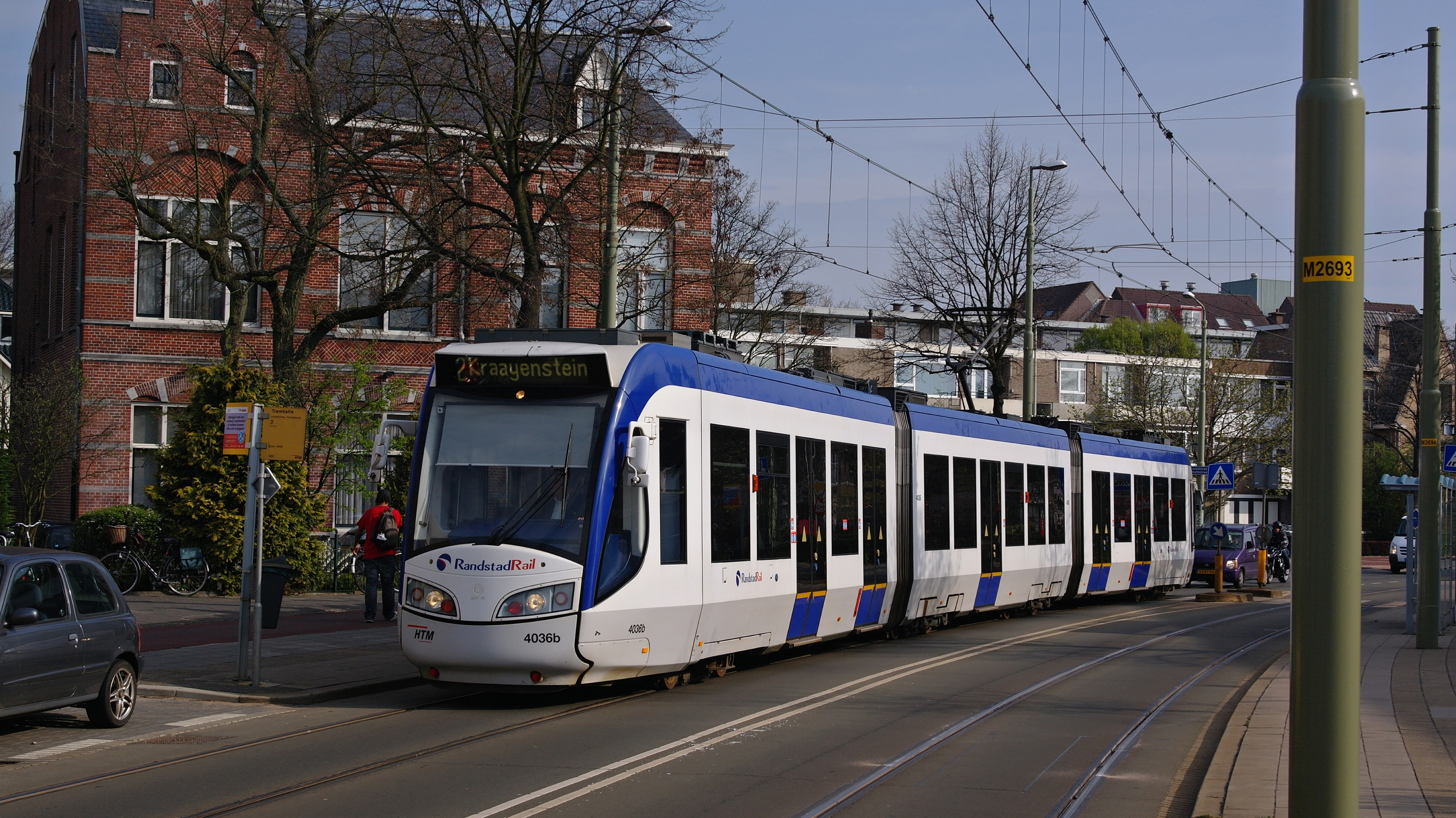
Regio Citadis 4036 tram on tram line 2.

Loosduinen has had public transport for a long time with a tram connection being established with The Hague in 1882. This connection was later expanded with more villages and cities, such as Poeldijk in 1883 and Delft in 1912. During 1888 to 1928 there was even a tram connection with Kijkduin which only operated in the summer, since it was a popular beach destination for the people living in the nearby area. The steam trams that were used for transportation were operated by the Westlandsche Stoomtramweg Maatschappij. Besides transporting passengers the stream trams also transported goods. Later several tram connections were abolished. For example, the tram connection to The Hague was abolished in 1928 and replaced by a bus service, while the connection with Delft closed on 1 January 1968. In 1983 a new tram connection was set up with The Hague that runs parallel to the former steam tram line that connected Loosduinen with The Hague. This connection which is known as tram line 2 is operated by HTM Personenvervoer. Besides tram line 2, there is also a tram line 3 which connects The Hague with the Loosduinen. Unlike tram line 2 the connection of The Hague and Loosduinen through tram line 3 faced a lot of opposition from residents when it was proposed. However, through a comprehensive agreement between the parties the line was built nonetheless.

By car you can follow signs for Loosduinen with Kijkduin beach, which is adjacent to Loosduinen, and 'Centrum Loosduinen'. Parking in Loosduinen is largely free, but there is limited parking space.

For bicycles, Loosduinen is connected to downtown The Hague through a series of fast bicycle routes (doorfietsroute) that favour cycling over cars.

== Shopping centre ==
Loosduinen shopping center is a neighbourhood shopping center with a wide range of shops in the food and non-food sector supplemented by cultural (library), social (district office) and other facilities (doctors, pharmacies, physiotherapists, etc.). It has a special mix of national retail chains and independent retailers. In addition to the supermarkets, there are many speciality shops, particularly in the fresh sector, including several artisan bakers and butchers, cheese speciality shops, beverage shops and ice cream parlours, a chocolate shop and a poulterer. Also in the non-food sector the range is very diverse with several jewellers, opticians and book and magazine stores, a do-it-yourself shop, a shop in the home furnishings and several stores in the fashion and clothing segment. In addition, every Wednesday a market is organised on the Loosduinse Hoofdplein, where you can get back to the old-fashioned market feeling while walking past the dozens of stalls.

== Anthem ==
Loosduinen has its own anthem.

Kent gij het dorpje Loosduinen
Het ligt aan de rand van Den Haag
De mensen die wonen daar tussen de tuinen
En heten Van Spronsen en Van der Gaag

Chorus
Loosduinen is schoon, ja schoon, ja schoon
‘k Ben blij dat ‘k er woon, ja woon, ja woon
tussen de Witbrug en de Blauwe brug keer ik weer terug
Ik weet me geen raad, geen raad, geen raad
Als ‘k het dorpje verlaat, verlaat, verlaat
Ik voel me thuis waar ’t kerkje bij die molen staat
Zijn we bij ‘t kruispunt aangekomen
Waar Kris Kras en Kruimeltje weer staan
Ze staan daar te turen en staan daar te dromen
En denken Loosduinen zal nooit vergaan

Chorus
Tussen het duin van Loosduinen
Daar ligt Loosduinen, Kijkduin aan Zee
Je kunt er fijn zwemmen, je vel laten bruinen
En men is gelukkig en tevree
Refrein
Om mooi Loosduinen te aanschouwen
Stroomt heel de wereld hier tesaam
Het is heel plezierig om hier te vertoeven
Aan ’t einde der aarde klinkt onze faam

== Images ==
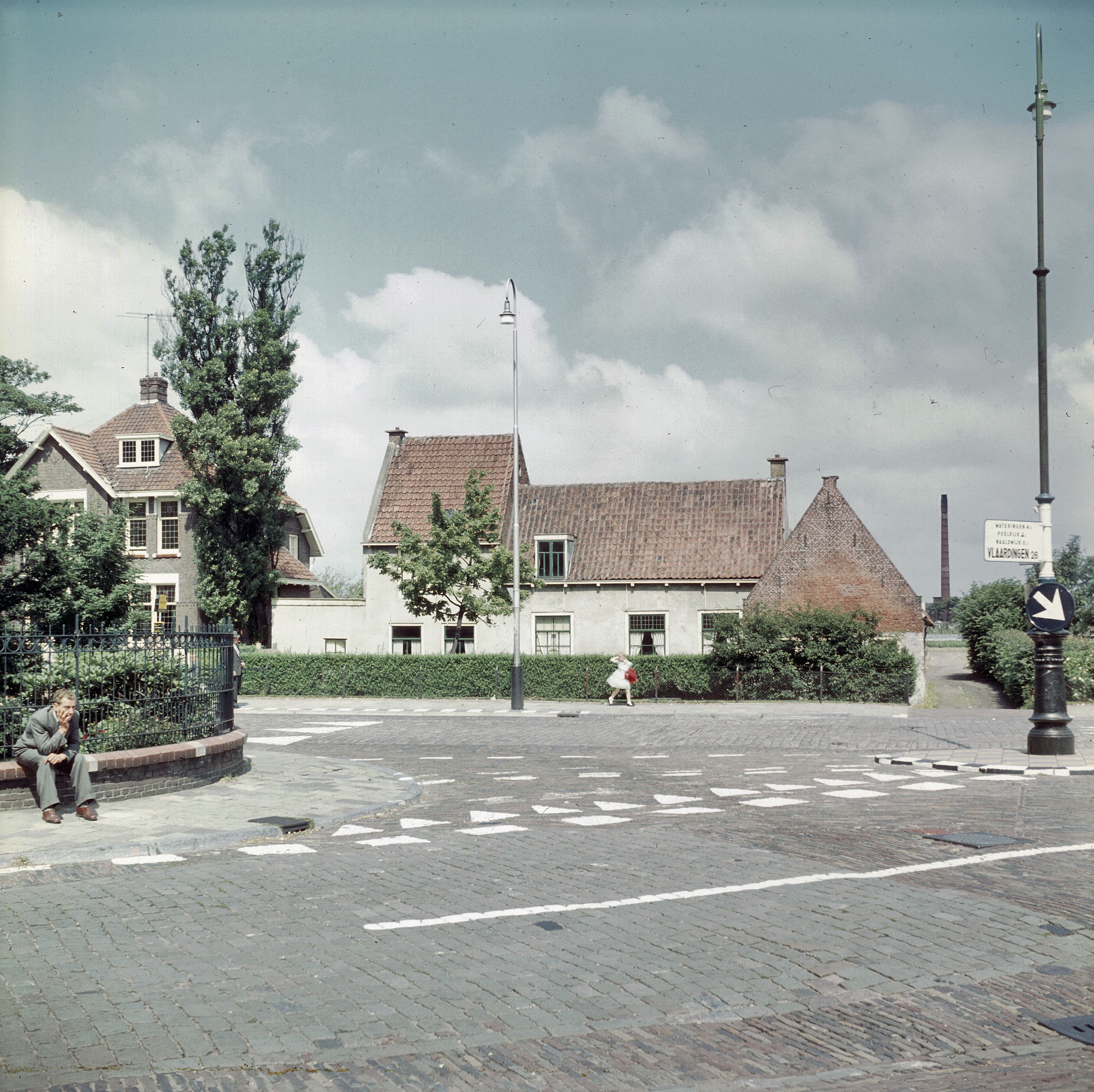
Street scene of Loosduinen in 1958

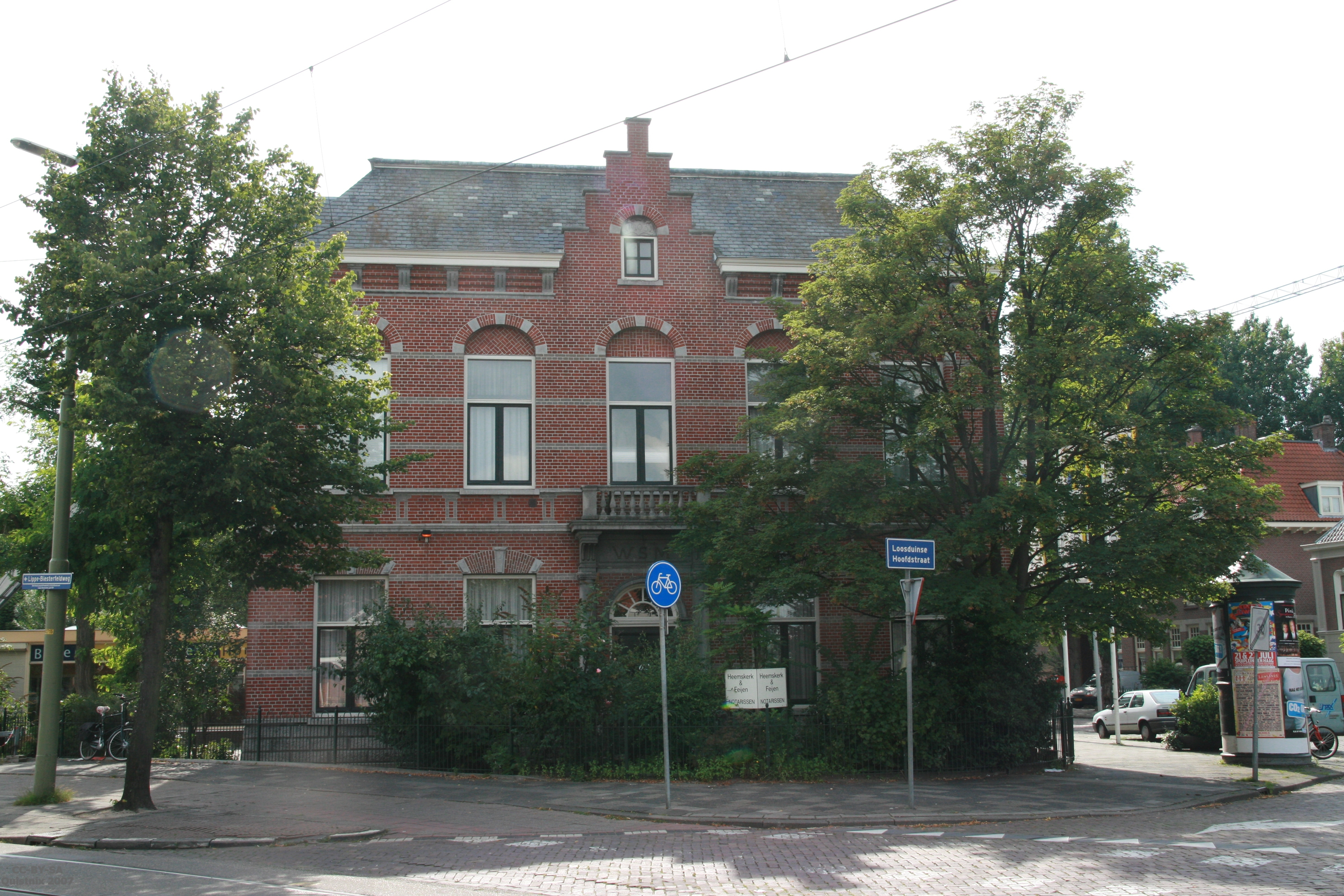
Former head office of the WSM in Loosduinen

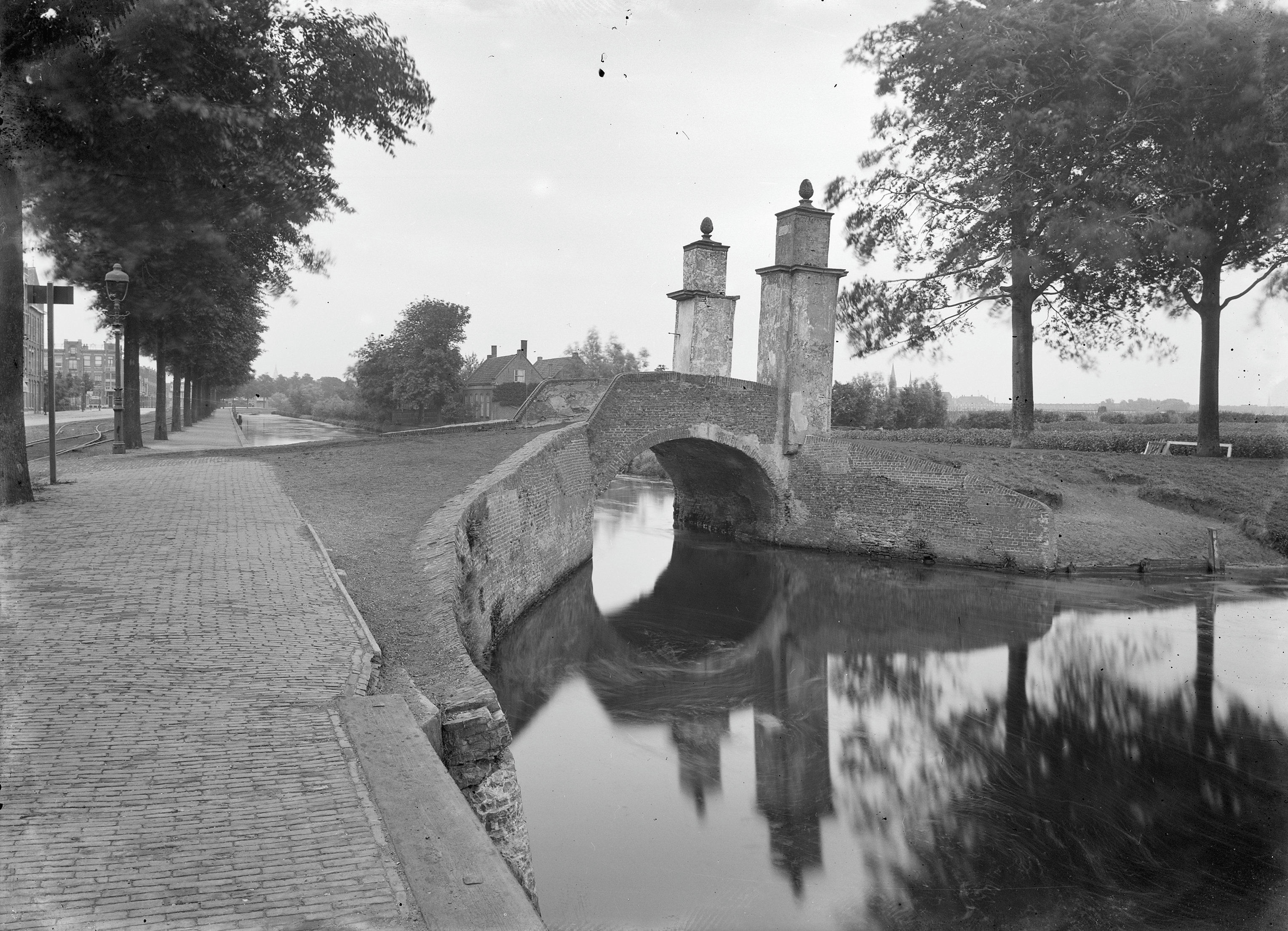
House Rustenburg: bridge with entrance gate on the Loosduinseweg

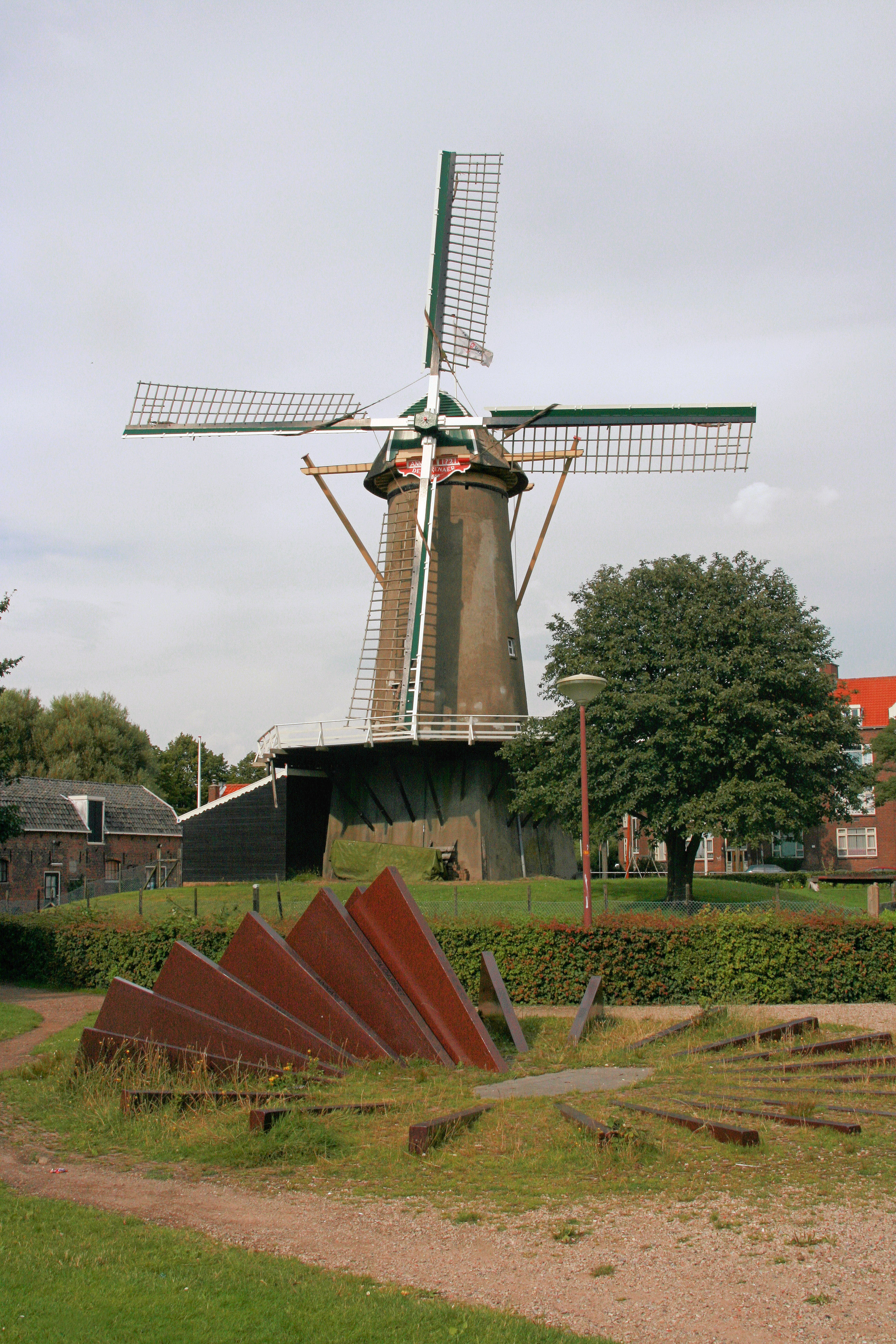
The windmill of Loosduinen.

== See also ==
- List of mayors of Loosduinen
