= Kijkduin en Ockenburgh =

- Flag Coat of arms

- Location of Kijkduin en Ockenburgh in The Hague
- Country: Netherlands
- Province: South Holland
- Municipality: The Hague
- District: Loosduinen

Area
  - Total: 4.96 km^{2} (1.92 sq mi)
  - Land: 4.73 km^{2} (1.83 sq mi)
  - Water: 0.23 km^{2} (0.089 sq mi)

Population (1 January 2020)
  - Total: 2,385
  - Density: 504/km^{2} (1,310/sq mi)

Kijkduin en Ockenburgh is a Dutch subdistrict of the Loosduinen district in The Hague. The subdistrict is located in the western part of The Hague at the municipal border of Monster. The area is bordered by the North Sea, an imaginary line between beach pole 105 and the De Savornin Lohmanlaan, the Machiel Vrijenhoeklaan, the Duinlaan, the Kijkduinsestraat, the Ockenburghstraat, the Loosduinse Hoofdstraat, the Monsterseweg and the municipal border with Monster. The subdistrict consists of two neighborhoods Kijkduin and Ockenburgh.

== History ==
=== Kijkduin ===
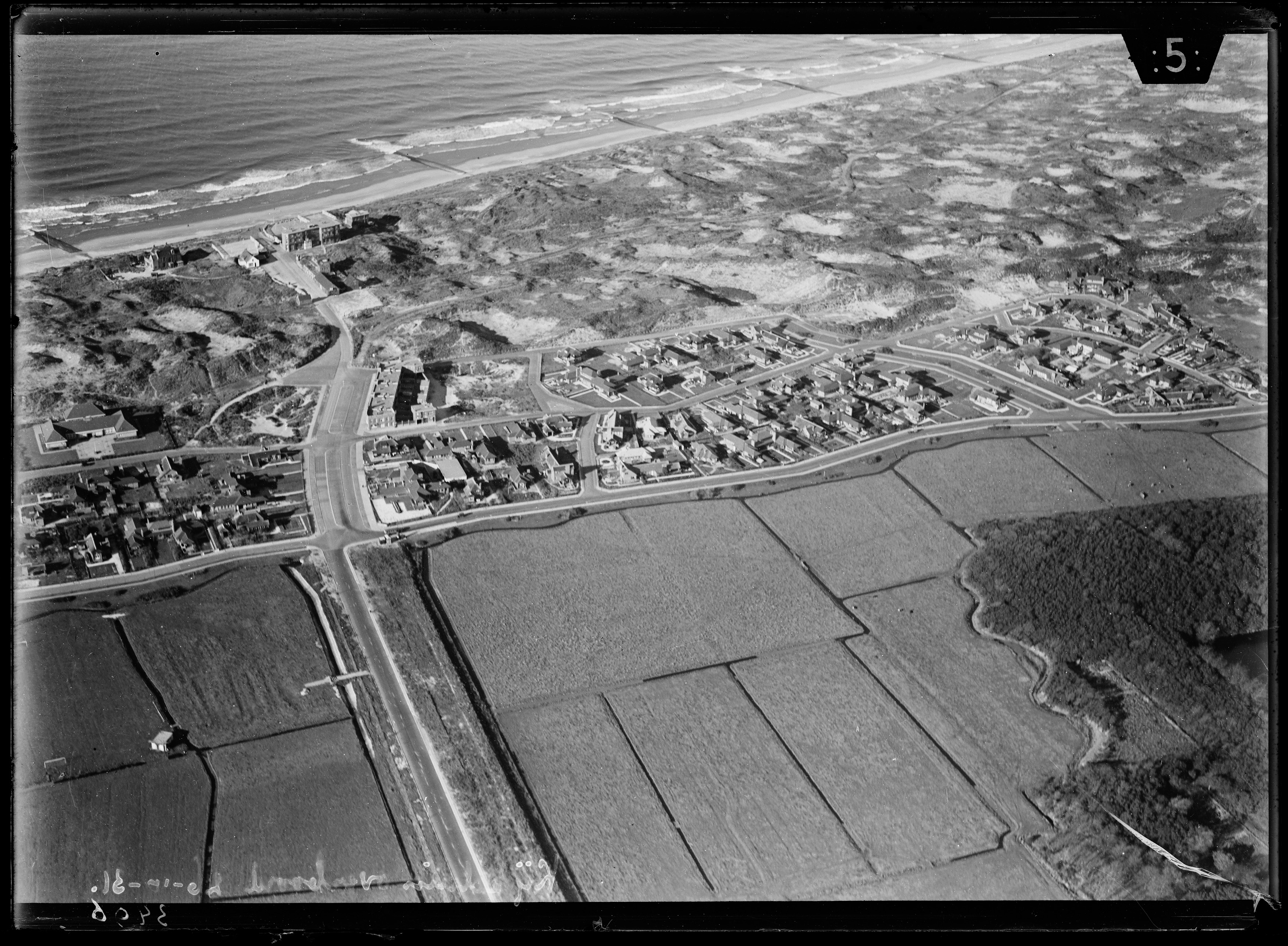
Aerial photograph of Kijkduin, taken between 1920 and 1940

Kijkduin is a seaside resort on the North Sea coast of the province of South Holland in the Netherlands. It is one of the two seaside resorts of the city of The Hague, the other being Scheveningen. Kijkduin has a long stretch of sand dunes along the coast. In the late 19th century, the seaside resort arose at the narrowest spot in the dunes on the south-western side of The Hague. Around 1890, with the construction of a bath hotel, the development of a bathing culture started. Kijkduin was especially suitable this because the dunes here were so narrow that people could easily get close to the sea. The proximity of country estates and the proximity of the city also played a role in this. The bathing hotel stood lonely on the top of the white dunes for a period of time. In 1900 there were only three villas, the bath hotel and a hospice of the Sophia Foundation. Between 1920 and 1923, the "Meer en Bosch" villa park was built at the foot of the dune. This park consisted of 126 rental and owner-occupied homes. Later, in 1930, a sea hospice was also built on the dunes of Kijkduin.

During and shortly after the Second World War half of the buildings in Kijkduin were demolished as a result of the Atlantik Wall, which was a massive defensive line built by the German occupation force. There are still 56 homes left, these fall under the protected cityscape Kijkduin - Meer and Bosch. In the sixties additional care functions were developed at the area as a care hotel where cardiac patients could rehabilitate and a care complex for lung patients was built. The development of the resort got an even stronger impulse when in the early seventies MAB developed the Atlantic Hotel and the shopping area. Until then, the facilities were limited to a simple bath hotel and a wooden pancake house. The development put Kijkduin on the map as a seaside resort, complete with a boulevard. The residential function also expanded. First with fifteen apartment blocks on the Kijkduinsestraat and the development of a bungalow park behind the Kijkduinsestraat.

Between 1954 and 1965, part of the Segbroek polder was set up as a camping site. The polder quickly grew into one of the largest campsites in Europe, which attracted large groups (especially young people) to Kijkduin. From the seventies the recreation development took a big flight. In the beach area behind the dunes, the municipality places the pueblo gardens with recreational facilities and sports fields in between. Camping Ockenburgh also develops from simple seasonal camping to a bungalow park (named Vakantiepark Kijkduinpark) with an adjoining 9-hole golf course. In the current situation, there is still a small campsite on the Kijkduinpark site.

=== Ockenburgh ===
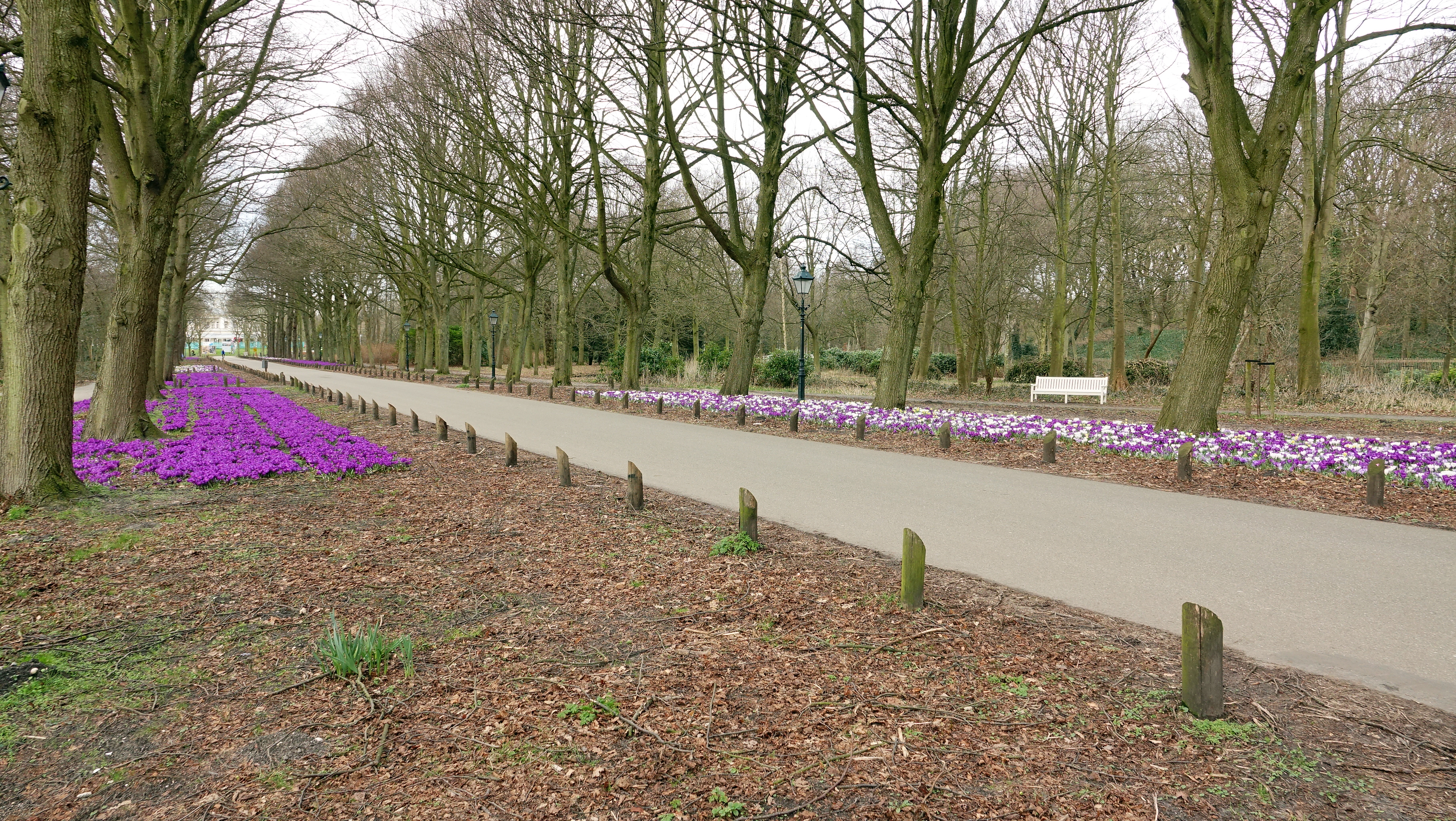
Ockenburgh Estate

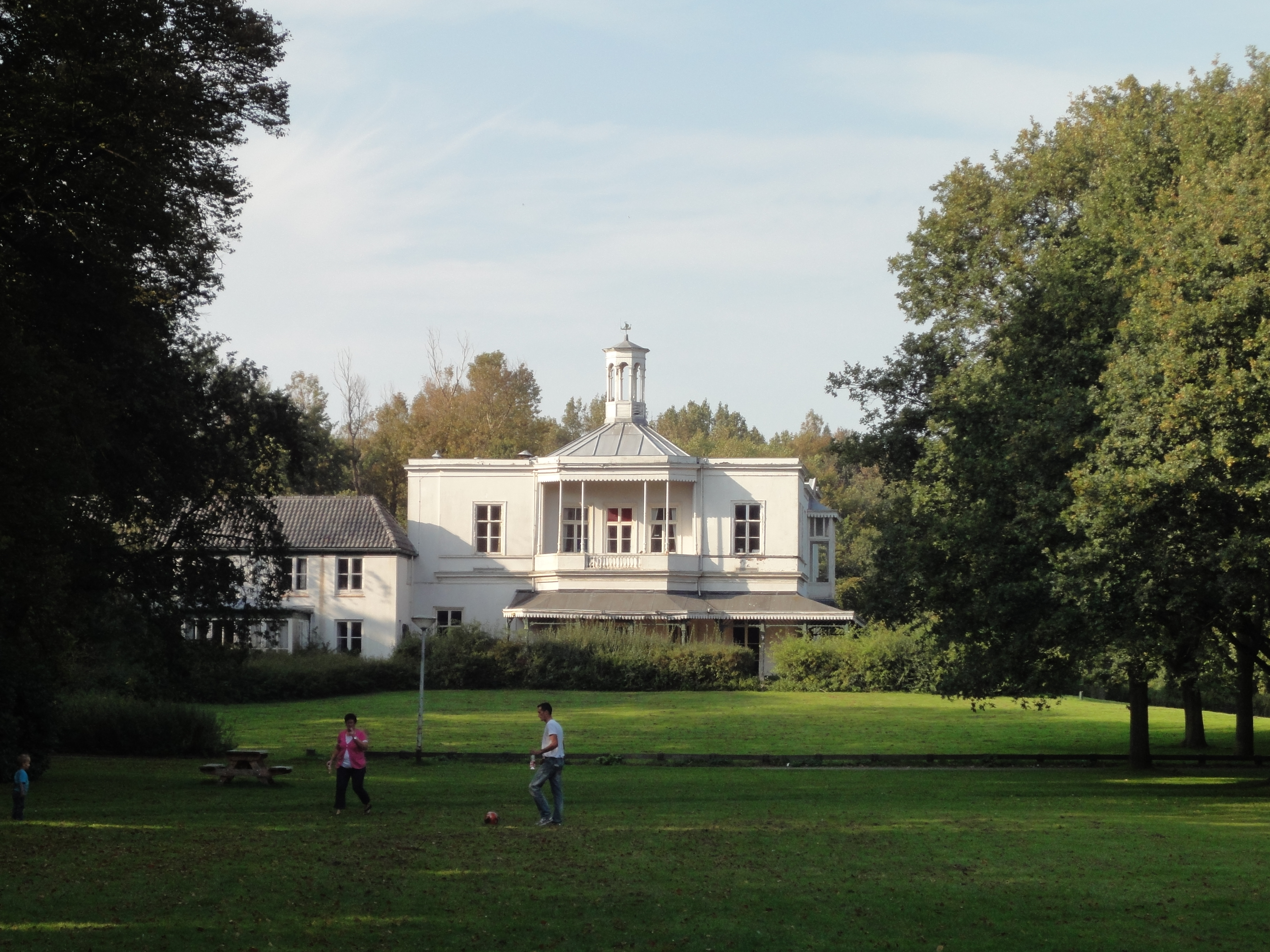
Former youth hostel on Ockenburgh Estate

Excavations show that there were already inhabitants in the Bronze Age in Ockenburgh. However, the name Ockenburg appears in literature for the first time around 1650, when the poet and physician Jacob Westerbaen bought the savage dune landscape south of The Hague and founded the Ockenburgh estate - Jacob's 'Eden in the Duyn'. Later, the history of the estate has an erratic course with several owners. One of these owners were the Pauw family. It is known that a member of this family (Maarten Pauw) extended the farmstead into real estate. Furthermore, Elisabeth Pauw, baroness douarière Van den Boetzelaer, ordered in 1746 land surveyor P. Looten to measure and drawn the Ockenburgh estate. The estate changed from a formal garden in 1840 into a landscape garden. The layout of the garden has not been changed since 1889.

During the First World War, Belgian soldiers stayed temporary on the estate. Furthermore, in 1919, the Ockenburgh Airfield was constructed on the site which marks nowadays the end of the Machiel Vrijenhoeklaan. The last known residents of the villa was the Menten family. In 1931 the estate was purchased by the municipality of The Hague and opened to the public. This made the estate for the first time in centuries accessible for normal citizens.

Just before the Second World War in 1939, the estate was home to Jewish children. In the same year the sports park in Ockenburgh, which was built in 1936, was converted into a military auxiliary airfield. During the mobilization in September 1939, there was a need for military (aid) airports in the west of the Netherlands. As a result, The Aviation Company took the Ockenburgh sports park into use. The Battalion Aviation Troops ensured that the sports attributes of the sports fields were removed and that the existing changing rooms could also be used. The porter's house (on the current Wijndaelerweg) was set up as a waiting room. A large tent was placed on the site where recently purchased Douglas 8a-3N aircraft from the United States were assembled. Furthermore, there were some Fokker's devices in depot.

The surveillance of the airfield was initially in the hands of the Grenadiers Regiment. These were relieved on 8 May by three sections of the 22nd Depot Company Surveillance Troops. In order to provide a good defence of the site, they did not have enough time to prepare for the German invasion of the Netherlands. The first German troops attacked the auxiliary airfield from the air in the early morning of 10 May. At first, it was only parachutists, later also airborne troops that were dropped on the field with Junkers Ju 52.

During the Battle for The Hague Ockenburgh was a stage of heavy fighting between Dutch and German troops. Due to the large German superiority with their better armament, the depot groups were pushed back to Loosduinen after 2 hours of heavy fighting. Of the 96 soldiers, 24 died and 18 were injured. The Germans failed to push through to the centre of The Hague to capture the Queen, the government and the Dutch High Command. Due to the unexpectedly fierce opposition at Ockenburgh, the troops of the Grenadiers regiment from The Hague and the Regiment Jagers from Monster were given the time to confine German troops. The artillery, which was installed at Poeldijk, ultimately drove the German troops from Ockenburgh. The 1st Battalion of Grenadiers eventually recaptured the auxiliary airfield. They also captured about 160 German soldiers. Another large group of German soldiers could escape the Dutch encirclement in the late evening of 11 to 12 May and reach Overschie via a nocturnal march. Just like the attack on the other airports in the region, Ypenburg and Valkenburg, the German attack on Ockenburgh failed. At the battle of Ockenburgh a total of 86 Dutch soldiers were killed.

After the Dutch capitulation, the military auxiliary airfield came back into German hands and a fake airfield was made. With wooden planes, fake lighting and fake barracks, it was intended to tempt allied airmen to throw their bombs on the fake airfield in order to protect the operational airfields from bombing. In the middle of 1943 the fake airfield was lifted. In 1942 the first minefields were constructed and were mainly intended for the reinforcement of the Atlantic Wall. Thousands of landmines were buried on and around the field. Soon after the liberation, these landmines had to be cleared by German prisoners of war. During the German occupation of the Netherlands, V2 rockets were also shot from the Ockenburgh estate towards London.

From 1954 onward Ockenburgh has had a campsite. The villa was used as a youth hostel and got an extension in the 1970s. A large modern wing with a construction of steel and glass, also called 'The Van Klingeren wing'. In 1996 the youth hostel was closed. In 2011 the Van Klingeren construction was removed and stored. In the nineties, the current Kijkduinpark was built on a part of the campsite.

Since 16 August 1990, the estate has been part of the protected nature reserve Solleveld. Over the past period, the park has been thoroughly restored under the direction of the South Holland landscape. Renovating the estate is special because it is a Natura 2000 area. This means that the estate is part of a European network of nature reserves. Among other things, new white estate banks have been installed and the bridge to dune forest 'de Zwitserland Partij' on the banks of the Spiegelvijver has been renewed.
