= Houtwijk =

- Neighbourhood of The Hague
- Location in The Hague
- Coordinates: 52°3′17″N 4°15′2″E
- Country: Netherlands
- Province: South Holland
- Municipality: The Hague

Area
  - Total: 146.3 ha (362 acres)
  - Land: 139.1 ha (344 acres)
  - Rank: 7th

Population (1 January 2019)
  - Total: 12,905
  - Density: 9,277/km^{2} (24,030/sq mi)
- Time zone: UTC+1 (CET)
  - Summer (DST): UTC+2 (CEST)

Houtwijk (roughly translated as "Wood District") is a neighbourhood of The Hague, located in the Loosduinen district, with more than 5,000 homes. Houtwijk mainly contains a lot of new constructions that were built both in and after the 1970s and 1980s. There are also both many owner-occupied and rental properties. While officially a neighbourhood of Loosduinen, some residents consider it its own subdistrict. This is mainly because its name contains wijk which translates to "district".

== History ==
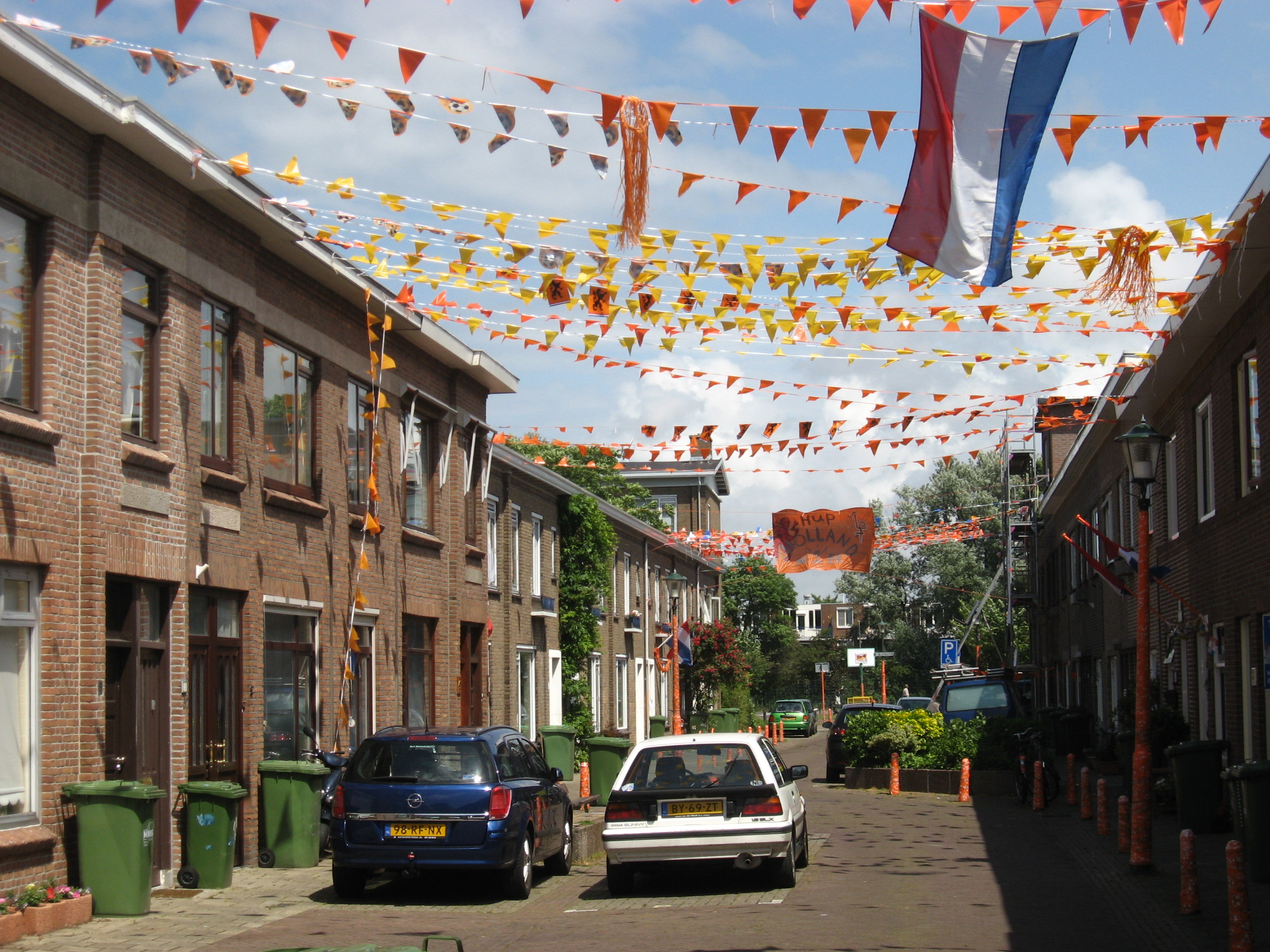
A street in Houtwijk decorated during the 2010 FIFA World Cup

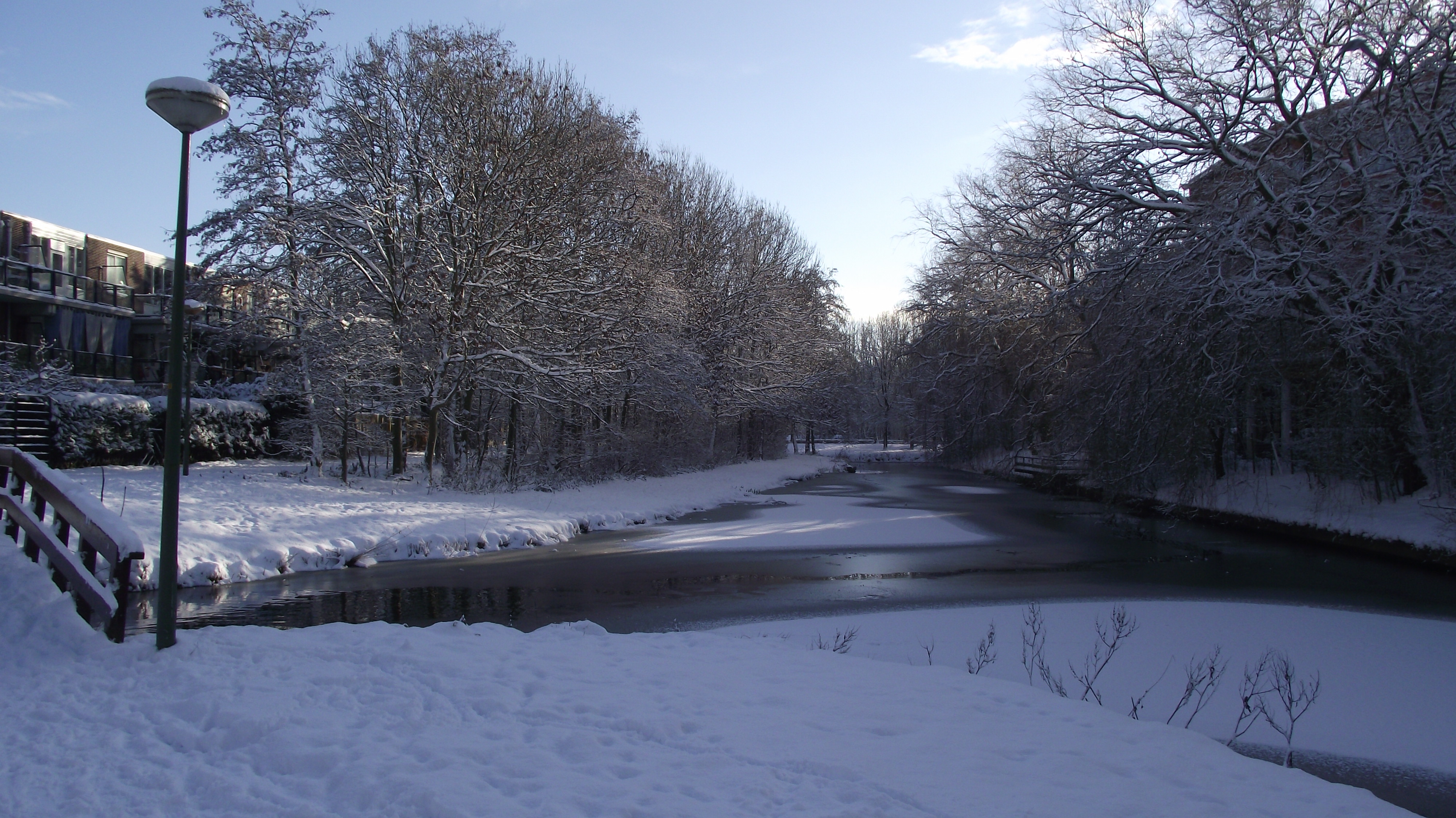
Houtwijk during winter

Houtwijk is young neighbourhood in comparison to other neighbourhoods in The Hague. The area was for a long time part of the village Loosduinen and during this period was a green area used by farmers with no residents living on it. The farmers used the area for the cultivation of fruits and vegetables, which then could be sold to the villagers via the local market or to other people in the surrounding areas. To do this the farmers made use of the canal in Loosduinen, since this was the most efficient way to transport the fruits and vegetables in both a cheap and fast manner. Furthermore, to sell their vegetables and fruits to nearby areas the farmers could make use of the Oude Haagweg, which is a road that has been used since medieval times and connects Loosduinen with the cities 's-Gravenzande and The Hague ('s-Gravenhage). Later, small auctions were created at other important roads, such as the Jan le Griepweg and the G.J. Van Marrewijklaan, to better reach customers outside Loosduinen. The popularity of these roads led over the centuries to numerous people settling along these roads. Nonetheless, most of the area was used for the cultivation of fruits and vegetables until the mid-20th century.

In 1923 Loosduinen ceased to be a municipality on its own, when it became part of The Hague. This had several consequences for the village. For instance, the local council made plans for the development of areas of the former Loosduinen municipality. One of these plans was the "Expansion Plan for The Hague of Berlage" of 1927, which called for the construction of more houses in Loosduinen and to make the area on par with other areas that were part of The Hague. The plan was worked out by the City Development and Housing Department for Loosduinen with contributions of P. Bakker Schut, the director of the Urban Development and Public Housing Department. While the plan called for expansion of buildings in Loosduinen, this was still on a small scale. The expansion did not lead to a massive increase in the population of Loosduinen. Rather, some small neighbourhoods were created. For example, one of the most well-known quarters in Loosduinen was built during this period, namely the Burgemeestersbuurt. This quarter was built at the north-east side of Loosduinen and contains many streets and squares that are named after former mayors (burgemeesters in Dutch) of Loosduinen when it was still a municipality of its own. Examples include the Burgemeester Hovylaan or the Burgemeester Françoisplein. Houtwijk, however, still remained an area primarily used for the cultivation of fruits and vegetables during this period.

World War II had an impact on The Hague. The Battle for The Hague led to destruction in several areas, while the occupation by Germany also took its toll on the city. So after the war had ended there were many problems in the city that needed to be addressed. One of the biggest problems was the housing shortage in the city, there were many people who had no home and some of them were therefore out on the streets. Within the local council this led to discussions about whether areas that were mainly used for cultivation and horticulture needed be used instead to build houses on. This discussion took quite some time, but eventually led to an agreement which was supported by the majority in the local council in the 1950s. The agreement called for the construction of houses and other buildings in the Leyenburg and Oud Waldeck areas. The result of the agreement meant that the areas used for cultivation of fruits and vegetables in Loosduinen became significantly smaller for the first time in history. This trend continued in the 1960s when the remaining horticulturalists in the Leyenburg and Oud Waldeck areas left and moved to other places. It meant that the local council now could use other areas, such as Kraayenstein and Houtwijk areas, for the construction of houses and apartments. Meanwhile, in 1972, a new area was developed and called Nieuw Waldeck.

In 1973 plans were made to build houses and apartments in Houtwijk. These plans contained, among other things, that 5,370 homes were to be built, of which 55% were to be single-family homes. In these plans every quarter stood out on its own but at the same time also formed one whole. To make each quarter special the buildings were built with many varieties. For example, the buildings had different densities and heights. During the construction of Houtwijk, however, the plans were changed. Rather than spending time giving each quarter a unique look, the goal became to build as fast as possible to make sure people could be housed in the short term. Furthermore, the architects responsible for the designs of public spaces in Houtwijk were given less free space to make use of their own ideas and instead got directions of civil servants that were involved in the construction of the area. The architects did, however, manage to make their mark on public spaces in Houtwijk by making use of closed structures and creating long streets. They also made a clear and distinct separation between public and private spaces. For example, houses had a private and public side. Houtwijk also got its own small shopping centre, fields that can be used for wide range of activities and parks that are filled with hills, small lakes and plenty of green. It was also decided that the Burgemeestersbuurt was also to be part of Houtwijk neighbourhood.

Even though Houtwijk was a green area meant for the cultivation of fruits and vegetables for most of its history, it still has some marks left from this period. For example, the ditches of the lands are still partly visible here and there in modern Houtwijk.

== Naming ==
Houtwijk owes its name to the ancient path called Houtweg (roughly translated: Wood Road). This was an important road used since medieval times and connected many areas, villages and cities to each other. It used to run from what is nowadays known as Lippe Biesterfeldweg to the place where the Leyenburg hospital now stands, so roughly between the village of Loosduinen to the shopping mall at Leyweg. The name indicates that the road ran through a wooded area, since a forest was called 'wood' in Holland in earlier times. Further evidence is that the road was used around 1224 for the transport of wood. The road formed the vein of modern-day Houtwijk. Nowadays the Houtweg is no longer a road, but a paved cycle path. Furthermore, it is not even called Houtweg anymore. In 1967 the name Houtweg was changed to Kapelaan Meereboerweg to avoid confusion, since there was already a Houtweg in The Hague. The road has been known as Tulapad since 2016.

== Infrastructure ==
=== Traffic ===
Houtwijk can be reached in The Hague via several streets, such as Escamplaan, Margaretha van Hennebergweg, Oude Haagweg and Leyweg. However, the best way to get to Houtwijk from outside The Hague is via the highway A4 and taking the route Wippolderlaan - Lozerlaan - Escamplaan. Besides using a car to reach the neighbourhood it also be reached easily by tram and bus, since there are several bus and tram stops around Houtwijk. For example, Tram 2 has a stop at the Oude Haagweg which is only a few steps from the local shopping centre in Houtwijk. The same can be said of the bus stops, Bus lines 21, 23, 26, 31, 34, 35, 36, 86 and 427 have stops that are located in the neighbourhood and relatively close by the shopping centre. Besides these means of transport, Houtwijk has also many bicycles routes that connect with other routes in The Hague. A main cycle route runs along the Escamplaan through Houtwijk. Secondary main bicycle routes are located on the Oude Haagweg, Houtwijklaan and Leyweg. When it comes to parking, as of 2018 there are no paid parking spots in the neighbourhood. However, finding a parking spot can be hard in some streets, even for residents. This has led to some people parking on the roadways, but parking bans have been introduced by the local council to deal with these problems.

=== Shopping centre ===
Houtwijk has a small local shopping centre with several shops, bakery, supermarkets, restaurants and snackbars. For example, there is both a Lidl and Albert Heijn supermarket.

=== Education ===
There are as of 2018 two primary schools located in Houtwijk; Houtwijk and MZH Montessori Houtwijk. Some years ago Eshof used to be also a primary school located in Houtwijk, but it moved away to a different area in the mid 2010s. Besides the two primary schools, there is also a ROC Mondriaan located on the industry terrain at Zichtenburg and the main focus of this school is on Technology and ICT.

=== Neighbourhood centre ===
At the Bokkefort park there is a neighbourhood centre located which allows the youth to take part in several activities. There are also people from Jeugdwerk focus on guiding young people in Houtwijk. This is necessary since in the past there were many problems with young people in the neighbourhood. The problems ranged from occasional destruction of properties to stealing and violence. However, a project initiated by the municipality to keep children under the age of 12 on the right track is bearing fruit. There is no longer talk of annoying youth groups or groups that cause inconvenience for other residents. Deployment of Jeugdwerk remains necessary to prevent the formation of new groups. There is also a neighbourhood agent that keeps track of what is happening in the neighbourhood and is able to prevent problems before they actually happen.

=== Housing ===
When it comes to housing, most of the 5,370 homes are owner-occupied properties (55.7%). However, there are also many houses that are rented from three different social corporations (around 40%) by the residents living in them. The owner-occupied properties and houses rented from social corporations are located sometimes in separate streets, but for most cases they are mixed. The average value of the houses built in Houtwijk are with €181,350 only slightly below the average in The Hague. Research done by civil servants pointed out that the residents of Houtwijk give their own home a score of 8.4 out of 10, which is the highest of all the sub-district's and neighbourhoods in Loosduinen. When it is compared to other areas in The Hague, it is especially high since the average score for owner-occupied homes is 6.8 elsewhere in the city. As of 2018 there are many constructions ongoing in Houtwijk, for example, at the Oude Haagweg several apartments are being built, while others have recently been completed.

== Demographic ==
A large part of the population in Houtwijk is young, with 21.8% of the residents being under the age of 25.
